= Zimbabwe =

Country in Southeast Africa

Republic of Zimbabwe
(in other official languages)
Northern Ndebele	Ilizwe laZimbabwe
Ndau	Nyika yeZimbabwe
Chichewa	Dziko la Zimbabwe
Shona	Nyika yeZimbabwe
Sotho	Rephabliki ea Zimbabwe
Tswana	Lefatshe la Zimbabwe
Tsonga	Tiko ra Zimbabwe
Venda	Riphabuḽiki ya Zimbabwe
Xhosa	IRiphabhulikhi yaseZimbabwe
- Flag Coat of arms
- Motto: "Unity, Freedom, Work"
- Anthem: "Blessed Be the Land of Zimbabwe"
- Capital and largest city: Harare (Note: The Parliament of Zimbabwe sits at Mount Hampden); 17°49′45″S 31°03′08″E
- Official languages: 16 languages: Chewa; Chibarwe; English; Kalanga; Khoisan; Nambya; Ndau; Ndebele; Shangani; Shona; Sotho; Tonga; Tswana; Venda; Xhosa; Zimbabwean sign language
- Ethnic groups (2022 census): 99.6% Black African (Note: Mainly majority Shona and minority Ndebele); 0.2% European; 0.1% Coloured; 0.1% other (Note: Includes those of Asian descent)
- Religion (2017): 84.1% Christianity; 69.2% Protestantism; 14.9% other Christian; 10.2% no religion; 4.5% traditional faiths; 1.2% others
- Demonym: Zimbabwean
- Government: Unitary assembly-independent republic
  - President: Emmerson Mnangagwa
  - First Vice-President: Constantino Chiwenga
  - Second Vice-President: Kembo Mohadi
- Legislature: Parliament
  - Upper house: Senate
  - Lower house: National Assembly

Independence from the United Kingdom
  - Declared: 11 November 1965
  - Republic: 2 March 1970
  - Zimbabwe Rhodesia: 1 June 1979
  - Independence recognised: 18 April 1980
  - Current constitution: 15 May 2013

Area
  - Total: 390,757 km^{2} (150,872 sq mi) (60th)
  - Water (%): 1

Population
  - February 2026 estimate: ▲17,166,852 (74th)
  - 2022 census: 15,178,957
  - Density: 45/km^{2} (116.5/sq mi) (179th)
- GDP (PPP): 2025 estimate
  - Total: ▲$93.870 billion (104th)
  - Per capita: ▲$5,410 (151st)
- GDP (nominal): 2025 estimate
  - Total: ▲$53.310 billion (101st)
  - Per capita: ▲$3,070 (152nd)
- Gini (2019): ▲45.5 medium inequality
- HDI (2023): ▲0.598 medium (153rd)
- Currency: De jure: Zimbabwe Gold (ZWG); De facto: United States dollar (USD); South African rand (ZAR); Other currencies (Note: Since the indefinite suspension of the Zimbabwean dollar, from 12 April 2009, the euro, United States dollar, pound sterling, South African rand, Botswana pula, Australian dollar, Chinese yuan, Indian rupee, and Japanese yen have been used as legal tenders.)
- Time zone: UTC+2 (CAT)
- Date format: dd/mm/yyyy
- Calling code: +263
- ISO 3166 code: ZW
- Internet TLD: .zw

Zimbabwe, (Note: (/zɪmˈbɑːbweɪ, -wi/; Shona pronunciation: [zi.ᵐba.ɓwe])) officially the Republic of Zimbabwe, is a landlocked country in Southeast Africa, between the Zambezi and Limpopo River, bordered by South Africa to the south, Botswana to the southwest, Zambia to the north, and Mozambique to the east. The capital and largest city is Harare, and the second largest is Bulawayo.

A country of roughly 17.3 million people per 2026 estimates, Zimbabwe's largest ethnic groups are the Northern Ndebele and Shona, who make up 95% of the total population, followed by the other smaller minorities. Zimbabwe has 16 official languages, with English, Shona, and Ndebele the most commonly employed. Zimbabwe is a member of the United Nations, the Southern African Development Community, the African Union, and the Common Market for Eastern and Southern Africa.

The region was long inhabited by the San, and was settled by Bantu peoples around 2,000 years ago. Beginning in the 11th century the Shona people constructed the city of Great Zimbabwe, which became one of the major African trade centres by the 13th century. From there, the Kingdom of Zimbabwe was established, followed by the Mutapa and Rozvi empires. The British Empire began to consolidate control of the area following the 1890 British Ultimatum against the Portuguese, who had claimed the area between Angola and Mozambique in the 1885 Pink Map. The British South Africa Company of Cecil Rhodes demarcated the Rhodesia region in 1890 when they conquered Mashonaland and later in 1893 Matabeleland after the First Matabele War. Company rule ended in 1923 with the establishment of Southern Rhodesia as a self-governing British colony. In 1965, the white minority government unilaterally declared independence as Rhodesia. The state endured international isolation and a 15-year guerrilla war with black rebel forces; this culminated in a peace agreement that established de jure sovereignty as Zimbabwe in April 1980.

Robert Mugabe became Prime Minister of Zimbabwe in 1980; he was the President of Zimbabwe from 1987, after converting the country's initial parliamentary system into a presidential one (with the abolishment of direct presidential elections as of 2026 it is now an assembly independent system), until his resignation in 2017 following a coup. Under Mugabe's authoritarian regime, the state security apparatus dominated the country and was responsible for widespread human rights violations, which received worldwide condemnation. From 1997 to 2008, the economy experienced consistent decline (and in the latter years, hyperinflation), though it has since seen rapid growth after the use of currencies other than the Zimbabwean dollar was permitted. In 2017, in the wake of over a year of protests against his government as well as Zimbabwe's rapidly declining economy, a coup d'état resulted in Mugabe's resignation. Emmerson Mnangagwa has since served as Zimbabwe's president.

== Etymology ==
The name "Zimbabwe" stems from a Shona term for Great Zimbabwe, a medieval city (Masvingo) in the country's south-east. Two different theories address the origin of the word. Many sources hold that "Zimbabwe" derives from dzimba-dza-mabwe, translated from the Karanga dialect of Shona as "houses of stones" (dzimba = plural of imba, "house"; mabwe = plural of ibwe, "stone"). The Karanga-speaking Shona people live around Great Zimbabwe in the modern-day Masvingo province. Archaeologist Peter Garlake claims that "Zimbabwe" represents a contracted form of dzimba-hwe, which means "venerated houses" in the Zezuru dialect of Shona and usually references chiefs' houses or graves.

Zimbabwe was formerly known as Southern Rhodesia (1898), Rhodesia (1965), and Zimbabwe Rhodesia (1979). The first recorded use of "Zimbabwe" as a term of national reference dates from 1960 as a coinage by the black nationalist Michael Mawema, whose Zimbabwe National Party became the first to officially use the name in 1961. The term "Rhodesia"—derived from the surname of Cecil Rhodes, the primary instigator of the British colonisation of the territory—was perceived by African nationalists as inappropriate because of its colonial origin and connotations.

According to Mawema, black nationalists held a meeting in 1960 to choose an alternative name for the country, proposing names such as "Matshobana" and "Monomotapa" before his suggestion, "Zimbabwe", prevailed. It was initially unclear how the chosen term was to be used—a letter written by Mawema in 1961 refers to "Zimbabweland"—but "Zimbabwe" was sufficiently established by 1962 to become the generally preferred term of the black nationalist movement. Like those of many African countries that gained independence during the Cold War, Zimbabwe is an ethnically neutral name. It is debatable to what extent Zimbabwe, being over 80% Shona and dominated by them in various ways, can be described as a nation state. The constitution acknowledges 16 languages, but only embraces two of them nationally, Shona and English. Shona is taught widely in schools, unlike Ndebele. Zimbabwe has never had a non-Shona head of the government.

== History ==
=== Pre-colonial era ===
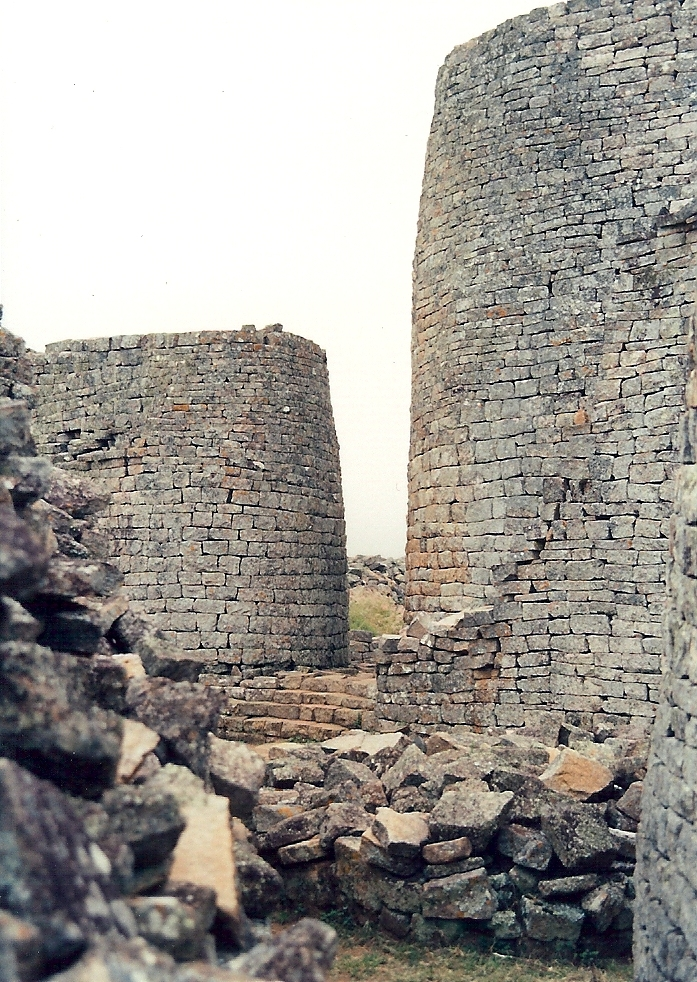
Towers of Great Zimbabwe

Archaeological records date archaic human settlement of present-day Zimbabwe to at least 500,000 years ago. Zimbabwe's earliest known inhabitants were most likely the San people, who left behind a legacy of arrowheads and cave paintings. Approximately 2,000 years ago, the first Bantu-speaking farmers arrived during the Bantu expansion.

Societies speaking proto-Shona languages first emerged in the middle Limpopo River valley in the 9th century before moving on to the Zimbabwean highlands. The Zimbabwean plateau became the centre of subsequent Shona states, beginning around the 10th century. Around the early 10th century, trade developed with Arab merchants on the Indian Ocean coast, helping to develop the Kingdom of Mapungubwe in the 13th century. This was the precursor to the Shona civilisations that dominated the region from the 13th century, evidenced by ruins at Great Zimbabwe, near Masvingo, and by other smaller sites. The main archaeological site used a unique dry stone architecture. The Kingdom of Mapungubwe was the first in a series of trading states which had developed in Zimbabwe by the time the first European explorers arrived from Portugal. These states traded gold, ivory, and copper for cloth and glass.

By 1300, the Kingdom of Zimbabwe eclipsed Mapungubwe. This Shona state further refined and expanded upon Mapungubwe's stone architecture. 14th-century Zimbabwe is documented in written sources. Ibn Battuta writes about Yūfī, a month's journey from Sofala in Mozambique. Yūfī is said to be home to the Limī people, and gold dust is brought from there to Sofala. Historians identify this as a reference to the Zimbabwe Plateau. From c. 1450 to 1760, the Kingdom of Mutapa ruled much of the area of present-day Zimbabwe, plus parts of central Mozambique. It is known by many names including the Mutapa Empire, also known as Mwene Mutapa or Monomotapa as well as "Munhumutapa", and was renowned for its strategic trade routes with the Arabs and Portugal. In a poem dated to the early 16th century, Ibn Mājid mentions Munāmunāwī as the name of the King of Zabnāwī, names which have been compared to Monomotapa and Zimbabwe respectively. He also mentions Munā-batūra, which may be a reference to the Kingdom of Butua.

The Portuguese sought to monopolise the trade routes in the region and began a series of wars which left the empire in near collapse in the early 17th century. As a direct response to increased European presence in the interior a new Shona state emerged, known as the Rozwi Empire. Relying on centuries of military, political and religious development, the Rozwi (meaning "destroyers") expelled the Portuguese from the Zimbabwean plateau in 1683. Around 1821 the Zulu general Mzilikazi of the Khumalo clan successfully rebelled against King Shaka and established his own clan, the Ndebele. The Ndebele fought their way northwards into the Transvaal, leaving a trail of destruction in their wake and beginning an era of widespread devastation known as the Mfecane. When Dutch trekboers converged on the Transvaal in 1836, they drove the tribe even further northward, with the assistance of Tswana Barolong warriors and Griqua commandos. By 1838 the Ndebele had conquered the Rozwi Empire, along with the other smaller Shona states, and reduced them to vassaldom.

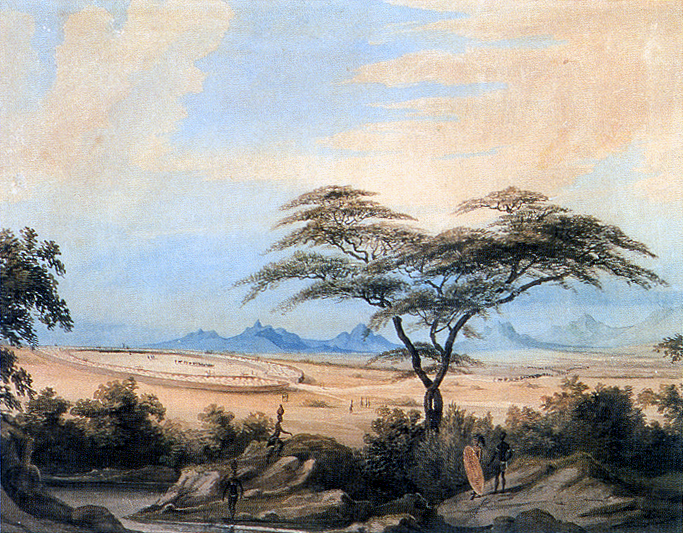
A Matabele kraal, as depicted by William Cornwallis Harris, 1836

After losing their remaining South African lands in 1840, Mzilikazi and his tribe permanently settled in the southwest of present-day Zimbabwe in what became known as Matabeleland, establishing Bulawayo as their capital. Mzilikazi then organised his society into a military system with regimental kraals, similar to those of Shaka, which was stable enough to repel further Boer incursions. Mzilikazi died in 1868; following a violent power struggle, his son Lobengula succeeded him.

=== Colonial era and Rhodesia (1888–1964) ===
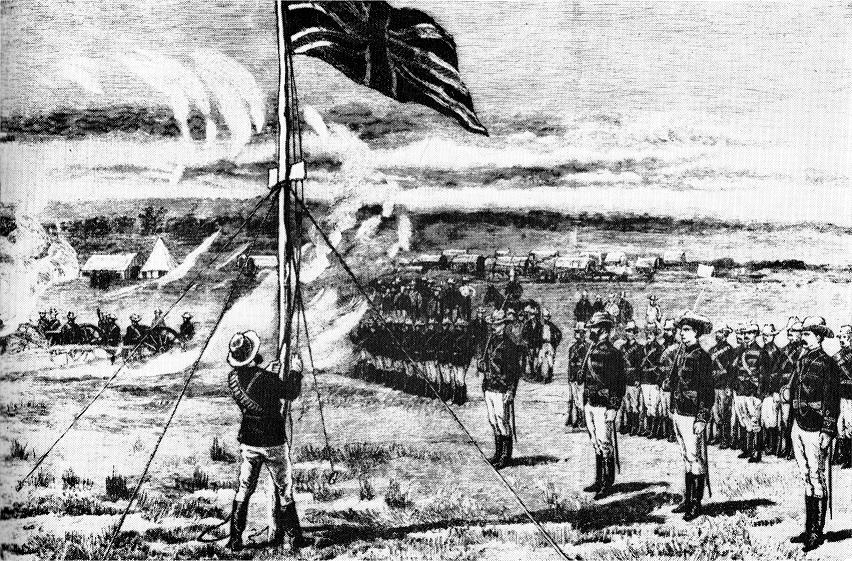
The Union Jack was raised over Fort Salisbury on 13 September 1890.

In the 1880s, European colonists arrived with Cecil Rhodes's British South Africa Company (chartered in 1889). In 1888, Rhodes obtained a concession for mining rights from King Lobengula of the Ndebele peoples. He presented this concession to persuade the government of the United Kingdom to grant a royal charter to the company over Matabeleland, and its subject states such as Mashonaland as well. Rhodes used this document in 1890 to justify sending the Pioneer Column, a group of Europeans protected by well-armed British South Africa Police (BSAP) through Matabeleland and into Shona territory to establish Fort Salisbury (present-day Harare), and thereby establish company rule over the area. In 1893 and 1894, with the help of their new Maxim guns, the BSAP would go on to defeat the Ndebele in the First Matabele War. Rhodes additionally sought permission to negotiate similar concessions covering all territory between the Limpopo River and Lake Tanganyika, then known as "Zambesia". In accordance with the terms of aforementioned concessions and treaties, mass settlement was encouraged, with the British maintaining control over labour as well as over precious metals and other mineral resources.

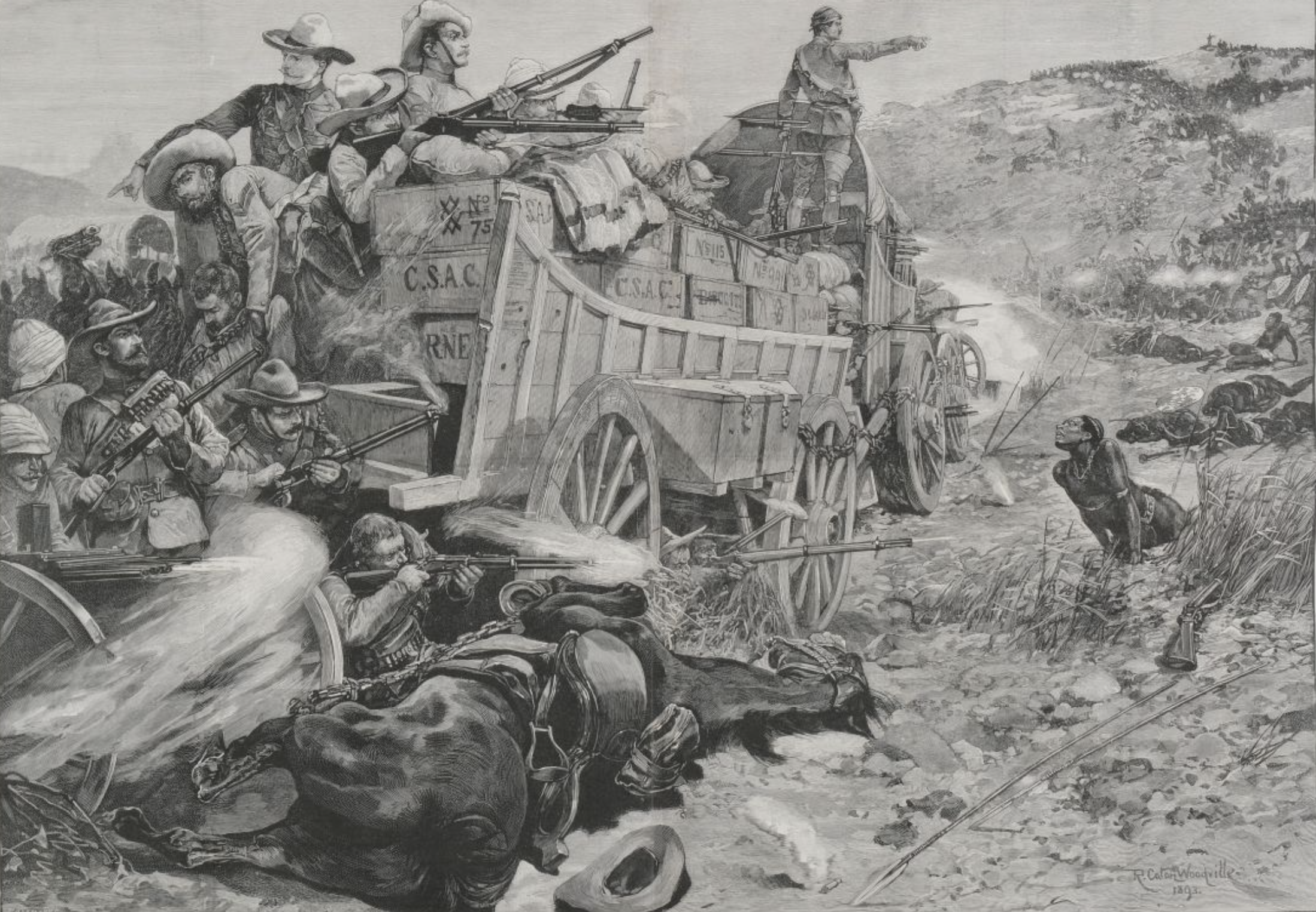
The Battle of the Shangani on 25 October 1893

In 1895, the BSAC adopted the name "Rhodesia" for the territory, in honour of Rhodes. In 1898, "Southern Rhodesia" became the official name for the region south of the Zambezi river, which later adopted the name "Zimbabwe". The region to the north, administered separately, was later termed Northern Rhodesia (present-day Zambia). Shortly after the disastrous Rhodes-sponsored Jameson Raid on the South African Republic, the Ndebele rebelled against white rule, led by their charismatic religious leader, Mlimo. The Second Matabele War of 1896–1897 lasted in Matabeleland until 1896, when Mlimo was assassinated by U.S. scout Frederick Russell Burnham. Shona agitators staged unsuccessful revolts (known as Chimurenga) against company rule during 1896 and 1897. Following these failed insurrections, the Rhodes administration subdued the Ndebele and Shona groups and organised the land with a disproportionate bias favouring Europeans, thus displacing many indigenous peoples.

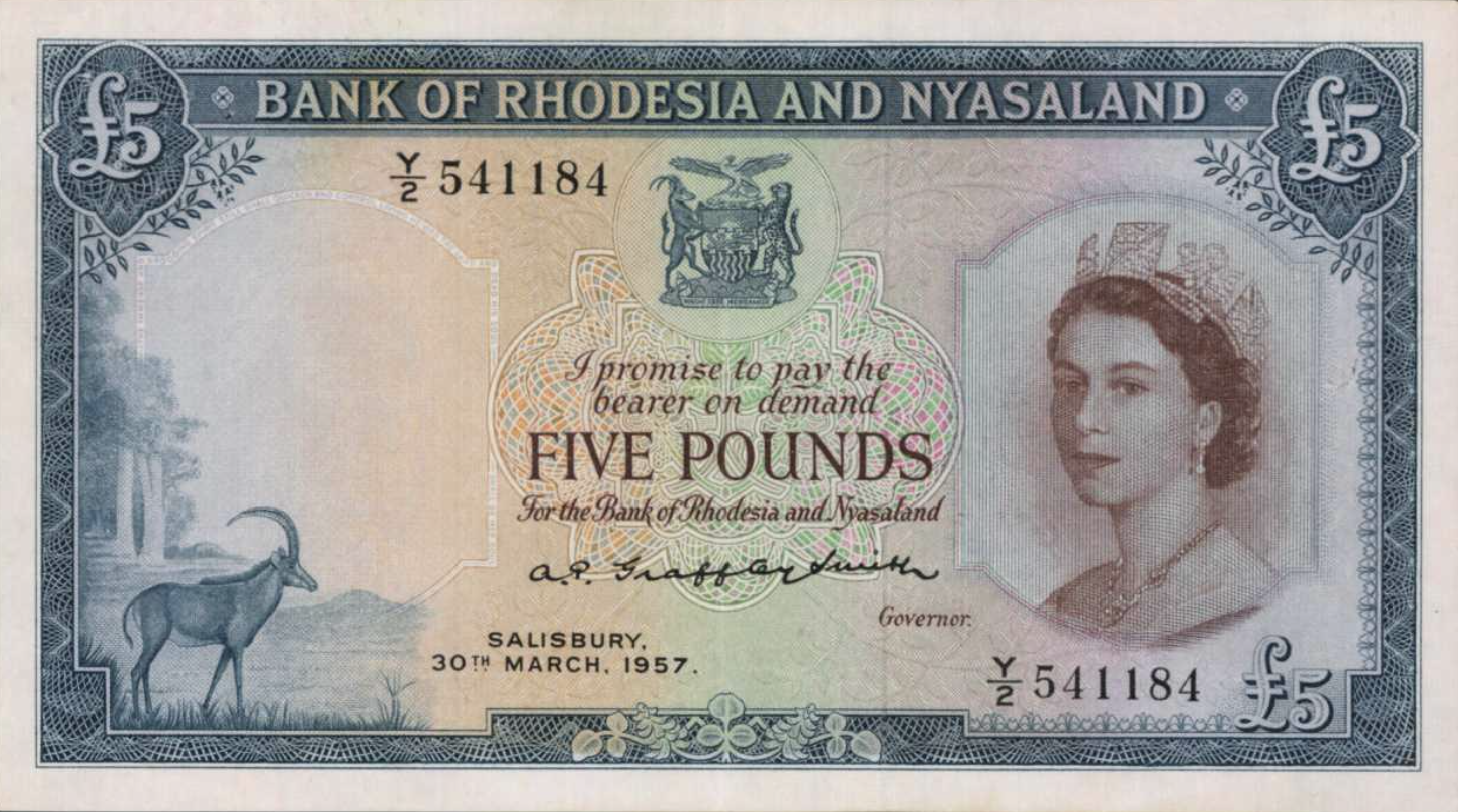
The Queen's portrait featured on Rhodesian banknotes and coins

The United Kingdom annexed Southern Rhodesia on 12 September 1923. Shortly after annexation, on 1 October 1923, the first constitution for the new Colony of Southern Rhodesia came into force. Under the new constitution, Southern Rhodesia became a self-governing British colony, subsequent to a 1922 referendum. Rhodesians of all races served on behalf of the United Kingdom during the two World Wars in the early-20th century. Proportional to the white population, Southern Rhodesia contributed more per capita to both the First and Second World Wars than any other part of the empire, including Britain.

The 1930 Land Apportionment Act restricted black land ownership to certain segments of the country, setting aside large areas solely for the purchase of the white minority. This act, which led to rapidly rising inequality, became the subject of frequent calls for subsequent land reform. In 1953, in the face of African opposition, Britain consolidated the two Rhodesias with Nyasaland (Malawi) in the ill-fated Central African Federation, which Southern Rhodesia essentially dominated. Growing African nationalism and general dissent, particularly in Nyasaland, persuaded Britain to dissolve the union in 1963, forming three separate divisions. While multiracial democracy was finally introduced to Northern Rhodesia and Nyasaland, Southern Rhodesians of European ancestry continued to enjoy minority rule.

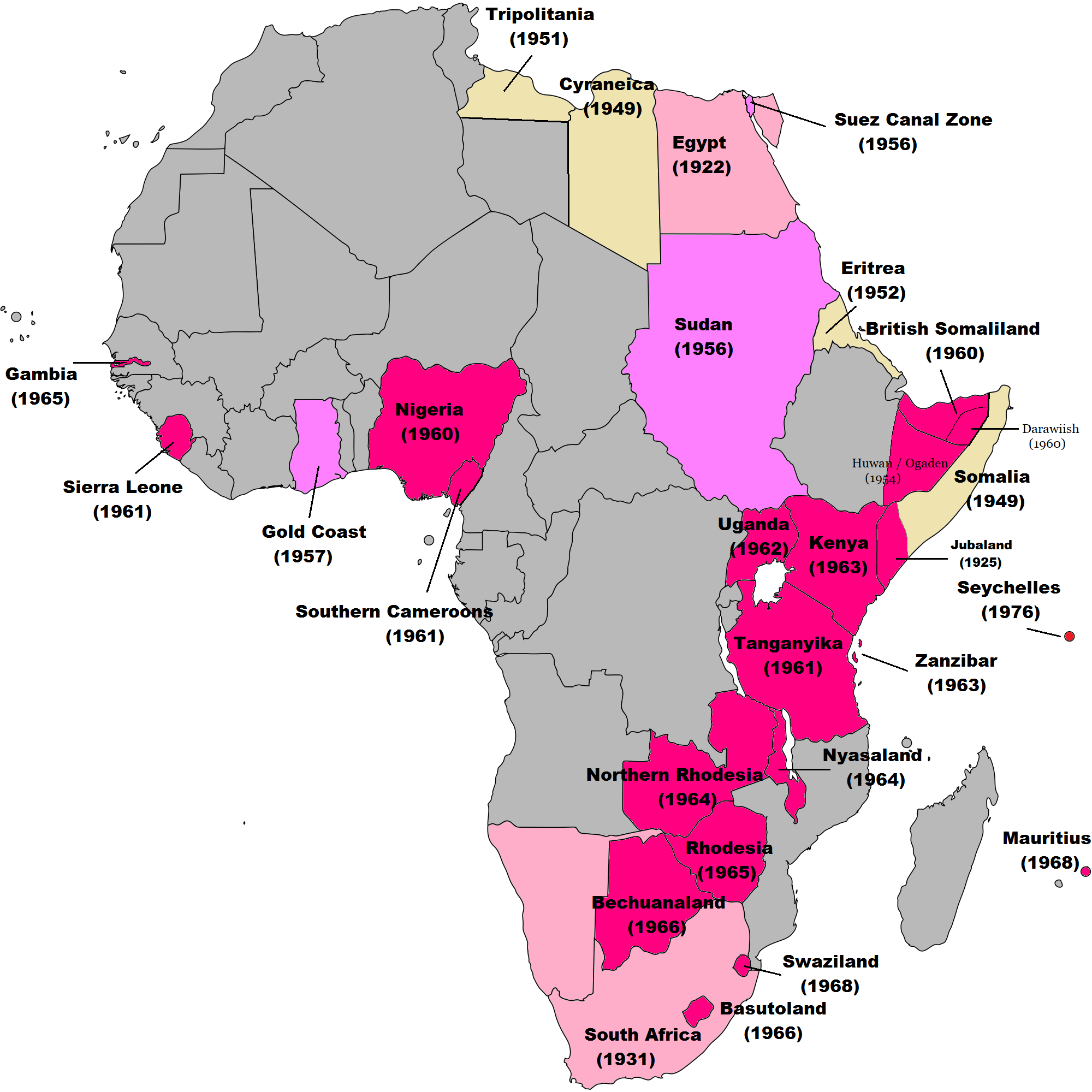
British decolonisation in Africa.

Following Zambian independence (effective from October 1964), Ian Smith's Rhodesian Front government in Salisbury dropped the designation "Southern" in 1964 (once Northern Rhodesia had changed its name to Zambia, having the word Southern before the name Rhodesia became unnecessary and the country simply became known as Rhodesia afterwards). Intent on effectively repudiating the recently adopted British policy of "no independence before majority rule", Smith issued a Unilateral Declaration of Independence (UDI) from the United Kingdom on 11 November 1965. This marked the first such course taken by a rebel British colony since the U.S. declaration of 1776, which Smith and others indeed claimed provided a suitable precedent to their own actions.

=== Declaration of independence and civil war (1965–1980) ===
The United Kingdom deemed the Rhodesian declaration an act of rebellion but did not re-establish control by force. The British government petitioned the United Nations for sanctions against Rhodesia pending unsuccessful talks with Smith's administration in 1966 and 1968. In December 1966, the organisation complied, imposing the first mandatory trade embargo on an autonomous state. These sanctions were expanded again in 1968.

A civil war ensued when Joshua Nkomo's Zimbabwe African People's Union (ZAPU) and Robert Mugabe's Zimbabwe African National Union (ZANU), supported actively by communist powers and neighbouring African nations, initiated guerrilla operations against Rhodesia's predominantly white government. ZAPU was supported by the Soviet Union, the Warsaw Pact and associated nations such as Cuba, and adopted a Marxist–Leninist ideology; ZANU meanwhile aligned itself with Maoism and the bloc headed by the People's Republic of China. Smith declared Rhodesia a republic in 1970, following the results of a referendum the previous year, but this went unrecognised internationally. Meanwhile, Rhodesia's internal conflict intensified, eventually forcing him to open negotiations with the militant communists.

Bishop Abel Muzorewa signs the Lancaster House Agreement, seated next to British Foreign and Commonwealth Secretary Lord Carrington.

In March 1978, Smith reached an accord with three African leaders, led by Bishop Abel Muzorewa, who offered to leave the white population comfortably entrenched in exchange for the establishment of a biracial democracy. As a result of the Internal Settlement, elections were held in April 1979, concluding with the United African National Council (UANC) carrying a majority of parliamentary seats. On 1 June 1979, Muzorewa, the UANC head, became prime minister and the country's name was changed to Zimbabwe Rhodesia. The Internal Settlement left control of the Rhodesian Security Forces, civil service, judiciary, and a third of parliament seats to whites. On 12 June, the United States Senate voted to lift economic pressure on the former Rhodesia.

Following the fifth Commonwealth Heads of Government Meeting, held in Lusaka, Zambia, from 1 to 7 August in 1979, the British government invited Muzorewa, Mugabe, and Nkomo to participate in a constitutional conference at Lancaster House. The purpose of the conference was to discuss and reach an agreement on the terms of an independence constitution, and provide for elections supervised under British authority allowing Zimbabwe Rhodesia to proceed to legal independence. With Lord Carrington, Secretary of State for Foreign and Commonwealth Affairs of the United Kingdom, in the chair, these discussions were mounted from 10 September to 15 December in 1979, producing a total of 47 plenary sessions. On 21 December 1979, delegations from every major interest represented reached the Lancaster House Agreement, effectively ending the guerrilla war. Under the terms of the agreement, the country would temporarily revert to British rule until an election could be conducted, after which it would be granted independence under black majority rule.

On 11 December 1979, the Rhodesian House of Assembly voted 90 to nil to revert to British colonial status. With the arrival of Christopher Soames, the new governor on 12 December 1979, Britain formally took control of Zimbabwe Rhodesia as the Colony of Southern Rhodesia. Britain lifted sanctions on 12 December and the United Nations on 16 December. During the 1980 Southern Rhodesian general election, Mugabe and the ZANU party secured a landslide victory. On 11 April 1980, Southern Rhodesia became the independent nation of Zimbabwe. Prince Charles, as the representative of Britain, formally granted independence to Zimbabwe in a ceremony.

=== Independence era (1980–present) ===
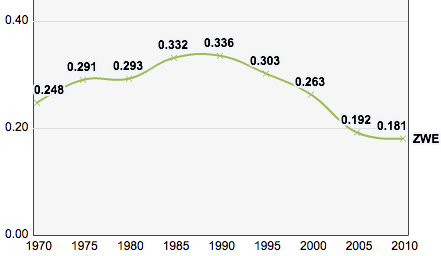
Trends in Zimbabwe's Multidimensional Poverty Index, 1970–2010

Zimbabwe's first president after its independence was Canaan Banana in what was originally a mainly ceremonial role as head of state. Mugabe was the country's first prime minister and head of government. In 1980, Samora Machel told Mugabe that Zimbabwe was the "Jewel of Africa" but added: "Don't tarnish it!".

New names for 32 places were gazetted on 18 April 1982 and by February 1984, there had been 42 changes, which included three rivers (Umniati/Munyati; Lundi/Runde; Nuanetsi/Mwenezi), and several changes from colonial names (such as Salisbury/Harare; Enkeldoorn/Chivhu; Essexvale/Esigodini; Fort Victoria/Masvingo)

Opposition to what was perceived as a Shona takeover immediately erupted around Matabeleland. The Matabele unrest led to what has become known as Gukurahundi (Shona: 'the early rain which washes away the chaff before the spring rains'). The Fifth Brigade, a North Korean-trained elite unit that reported directly to Mugabe, entered Matabeleland and massacred thousands of civilians accused of supporting "dissidents". Estimates for the number of deaths during the five-year Gukurahundi campaign ranged from 3,750 to 80,000. Thousands of others were tortured in military internment camps. The campaign officially ended in 1987 after Nkomo and Mugabe reached a unity agreement that merged their respective parties, creating the Zimbabwe African National Union – Patriotic Front (ZANU–PF). Elections in March 1990 resulted in another victory for Mugabe and the ZANU–PF party, which claimed 117 of the 120 contested seats.

During the 1990s, students, trade unionists, and other workers often demonstrated to express their growing discontent with Mugabe and ZANU–PF party policies. In 1996, civil servants, nurses, and junior doctors went on strike over salary issues. The general health of the population also began to significantly decline; by 1997 an estimated 25% of the population had been infected by HIV in a pandemic that was affecting most of southern Africa. Land redistribution re-emerged as the main issue for the ZANU–PF government around 1997. Despite the existence of a "willing-buyer-willing-seller" land reform programme since the 1980s, the minority white Zimbabwean population continued to hold the majority of the country's most fertile agricultural land.

In 2000, the government pressed ahead with its Fast Track Land Reform programme, a policy involving compulsory land acquisition aimed at redistributing land from the minority white population to the majority black population. Confiscations of white farmland, continuous droughts, and a serious drop in external finance and other support led to a sharp decline in agricultural exports, which were traditionally the country's leading export-producing sector. Some 58,000 independent black farmers have since experienced limited success in reviving the gutted cash crop sectors through efforts on a smaller scale.

President Mugabe and the ZANU–PF party leadership found themselves beset by a wide range of international sanctions. In 2002, the nation was suspended from the Commonwealth of Nations due to the reckless farm seizures and blatant election tampering. The following year, Zimbabwean officials voluntarily terminated its Commonwealth membership; its people remained Commonwealth citizens in British statute. In 2001, the United States enacted the Zimbabwe Democracy and Economic Recovery Act (ZDERA). It came into effect in 2002 and froze credit to the Zimbabwean government.

By 2003, the country's economy had collapsed. It is estimated that up to a quarter of Zimbabwe's 11 million people had fled the country. Three-quarters of the remaining Zimbabweans were living on less than one U.S. dollar a day. Following elections in 2005, the government initiated "Operation Murambatsvina", an effort to crack down on illegal markets and slums emerging in towns and cities, leaving a substantial section of urban poor homeless. The Zimbabwean government has described the operation as an attempt to provide decent housing to the population, although according to critics such as Amnesty International, authorities have yet to properly substantiate their claims.

Map showing the food insecurity in Zimbabwe in June 2008

On 29 March 2008, Zimbabwe held a presidential election along with a parliamentary election. The results of this election were withheld for two weeks, after which it was generally acknowledged that the Movement for Democratic Change – Tsvangirai (MDC-T) had achieved a majority of one seat in the lower house of parliament. In September 2008, a power-sharing agreement was reached between Morgan Tsvangirai and President Mugabe, permitting the former to hold the office of prime minister. Due to ministerial differences between their respective political parties, the agreement was not fully implemented until 13 February 2009. By December 2010, Mugabe was threatening to completely expropriate remaining privately owned companies in Zimbabwe unless "western sanctions" were lifted.

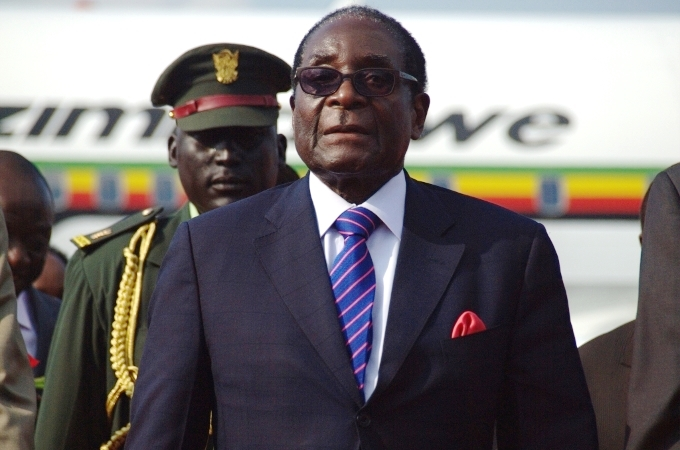
Zimbabwean President Robert Mugabe attending the Independence Day celebrations in South Sudan in July 2011.

In late 2008, problems in Zimbabwe reached crisis proportions in the areas of living standards, public health (with a major cholera outbreak in December) and various basic affairs. During this period, NGOs took over from government as a primary provider of food during this period of food insecurity in Zimbabwe. A 2011 survey by Freedom House suggested that living conditions had improved since the power-sharing agreement. The United Nations Office for the Coordination of Humanitarian Affairs stated in its 2012–2013 planning document that the "humanitarian situation has improved in Zimbabwe since 2009, but conditions remain precarious for many people".

A new constitution approved in the Zimbabwean constitutional referendum, 2013 curtails presidential powers. Mugabe was re-elected president in the July 2013 Zimbabwean general election which The Economist described as "rigged" and the Daily Telegraph as "stolen". The Movement for Democratic Change alleged massive fraud and tried to seek relief through the courts. In a surprising moment of candour at the ZANU–PF congress in December 2014, President Robert Mugabe accidentally let slip that the opposition had in fact won the contentious 2008 polls by an astounding 73%. After winning the election, the Mugabe ZANU–PF government re-instituted one party rule, doubled the civil service and, according to The Economist, embarked on "misrule and dazzling corruption". A 2017 study conducted by the Institute for Security Studies (ISS) concluded that due to the deterioration of government and the economy "the government encourages corruption to make up for its inability to fund its own institutions" with widespread and informal police roadblocks to issue fines to travellers being one manifestation of this.

In July 2016, nationwide protests took place regarding the economic collapse in the country. In November 2017, the army led a coup d'état following the dismissal of Vice-president Emmerson Mnangagwa, placing Mugabe under house arrest. The army denied that their actions constituted a coup. On 19 November 2017, ZANU–PF sacked Robert Mugabe as party leader and appointed former Vice-president Emmerson Mnangagwa in his place. On 21 November 2017, Mugabe tendered his resignation prior to impeachment proceedings being completed. Although under the Constitution of Zimbabwe Mugabe should be succeeded by Vice-president Phelekezela Mphoko, a supporter of Grace Mugabe, ZANU–PF chief whip Lovemore Matuke stated to the Reuters news agency that Mnangagwa would be appointed as president.

On 30 July 2018, Zimbabwe held its general elections, which were won by the ZANU-PF party led by Mnangagwa. Nelson Chamisa who was leading the main opposition party MDC Alliance contested the election results claiming voter fraud, and subsequently filed a petition to the Constitution Court of Zimbabwe. The court confirmed Mnangagwa's victory, making him the newly elected president after Mugabe.

In December 2017, the website Zimbabwe News said that at the time of independence in 1980, the country was growing economically at about five per cent a year, and had done so for quite a long time. If this rate of growth had been maintained for the next 37 years, Zimbabwe would have, in 2016, a GDP of US$52 billion. Instead it had a formal sector GDP of only US$14 billion, a cost of US$38 billion in lost growth. The population growth in 1980 was among the highest in Africa at about 3.5 per cent per annum, doubling every 21 years. Had this growth been maintained, the population would have been 31 million. Instead, as of 2018, it is about 13 million. The discrepancies were believed to be partly caused by death from starvation and disease, and partly due to decreased fertility. The life expectancy has halved, and deaths from politically motivated violence sponsored by the government exceed 200,000 since 1980. The Mugabe government has directly or indirectly caused the deaths of at least three million Zimbabweans in 37 years. According to the World Food Programme, as of 2019, over two million people were facing starvation because of recent droughts.

In 2018, President Mnangagwa announced that his government would seek to rejoin the Commonwealth.

In August 2023, President Emmerson Mnangagwa won a second term in an outcome of the election rejected by the opposition and questioned by observers. In September 2023, Zimbabwe signed control over almost 20% of the country's land to the carbon offset company Blue Carbon.

== Geography ==
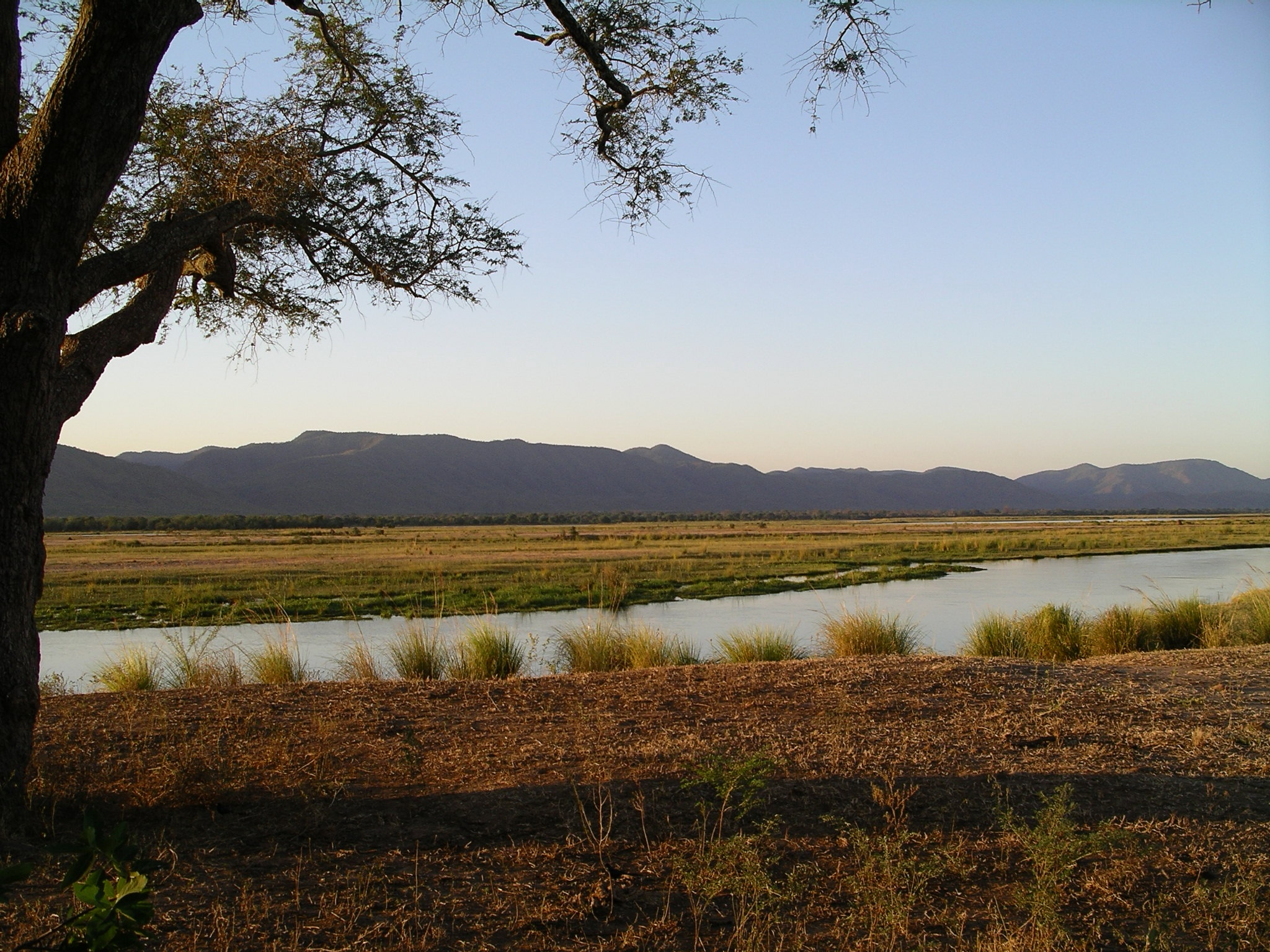
The Zambezi River in the Mana Pools National Park

Zimbabwe map of Köppen climate classification

Zimbabwe is a landlocked country in southern Africa, lying between latitudes 15° and 23°S, and longitudes 25° and 34°E. It is bordered by South Africa to the south, Botswana to the west and southwest, Zambia to the northwest, and Mozambique to the east and northeast. Its northwest corner is roughly 150 m (490 ft) from Namibia, nearly forming a four-nation quadripoint. Most of the country sits on the Zimbabwean Plateau, which generally has an elevation of over 1,000 m (3,300 ft). The country's extreme east is mountainous, this area being known as the Eastern Highlands, with Mount Nyangani as the highest point at 2,592 m (8,504 ft).

The highlands are known for their natural environment, with tourist destinations such as Nyanga, Troutbeck, Chimanimani, Vumba and Chirinda Forest at Mount Selinda. About 20% of the country consists of low-lying areas, (the low veld) under 900m. Victoria Falls, one of the world's largest and most spectacular waterfalls, is located in the country's extreme northwest and is part of the Zambezi river.

=== Geology ===
Over geological time, Zimbabwe has experienced two major post-Gondwana erosion cycles (known as African and post-African), and a very subordinate Plio-Pleistocene cycle.

=== Climate ===
Zimbabwe has a subtropical climate with many local variations. The southern areas are known for their heat and aridity, while parts of the central plateau receive frost in winter. The Zambezi valley is known for its extreme heat, and the Eastern Highlands usually experience cool temperatures and the highest rainfall in the country. The country's rainy season generally runs from late October to March, and the hot climate is moderated by increasing altitude. Zimbabwe is faced with recurring droughts. In 2019, at least 55 elephants died because of drought. Severe storms are rare.

=== Biodiversity ===
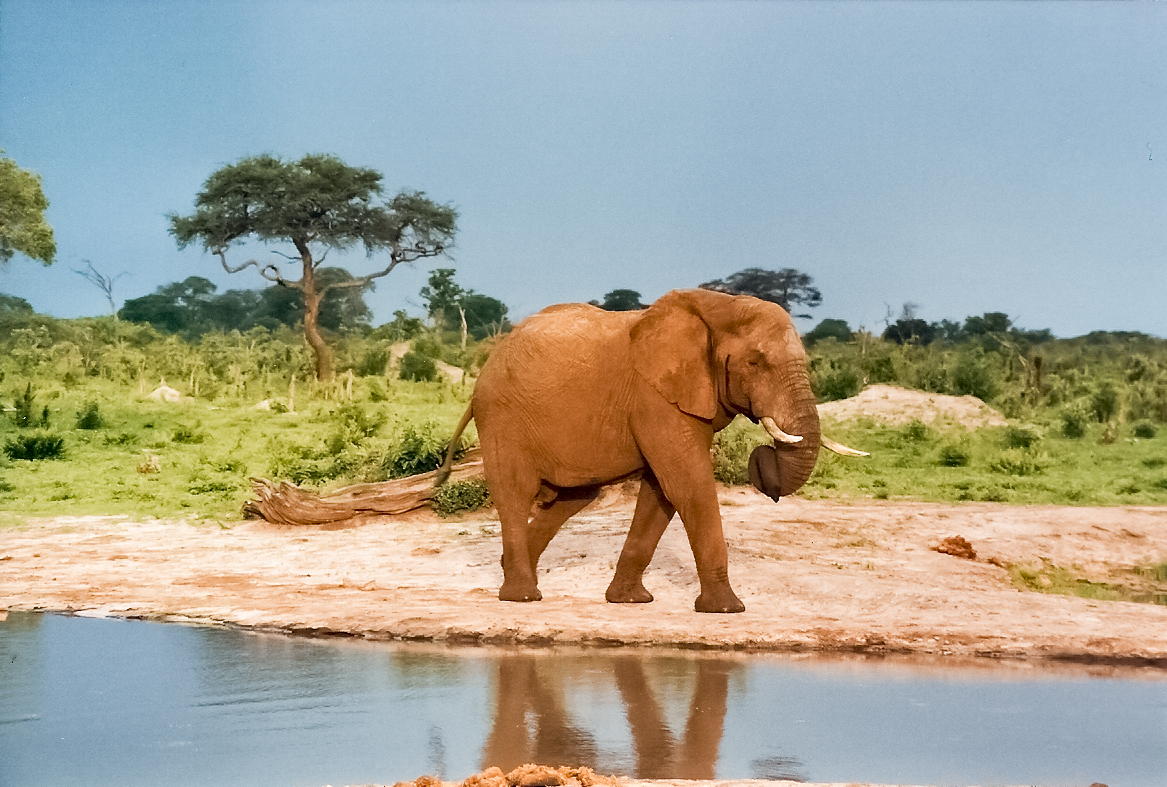
An elephant at a water hole in Hwange National Park

Zimbabwe contains seven terrestrial ecoregions: Kalahari acacia–baikiaea woodlands, Southern Africa bushveld, Southern miombo woodlands, Zambezian Baikiaea woodlands, Zambezian and mopane woodlands, Zambezian halophytics, and Eastern Zimbabwe montane forest-grassland mosaic in the Eastern Highlands.

The country is mostly savanna, although the moist and mountainous Eastern Highlands support areas of tropical evergreen and hardwood forests. Trees found in the Eastern Highlands include teak, mahogany, enormous specimens of strangler fig, forest Newtonia, big leaf, white stinkwood, chirinda stinkwood, knobthorn and many others.

In the low-lying parts of the country fever trees, mopane, combretum and baobabs abound. Much of the country is covered by miombo woodland, dominated by brachystegia species and others. Among the numerous flowers and shrubs are hibiscus, flame lily, snake lily, spider lily, leonotis, cassia, tree wisteria and dombeya. There are around 350 species of mammals that can be found in Zimbabwe. There are also many snakes and lizards, over 500 bird species, and 131 fish species.

Large parts of Zimbabwe were once covered by forests with abundant wildlife. Deforestation and poaching has reduced the amount of wildlife. Woodland degradation and deforestation caused by population growth, urban expansion and use for fuel are major concerns and have led to erosion which diminishes the amount of fertile soil. Local farmers have been criticised by environmentalists for burning off vegetation to heat their tobacco barns.

== Government and politics ==
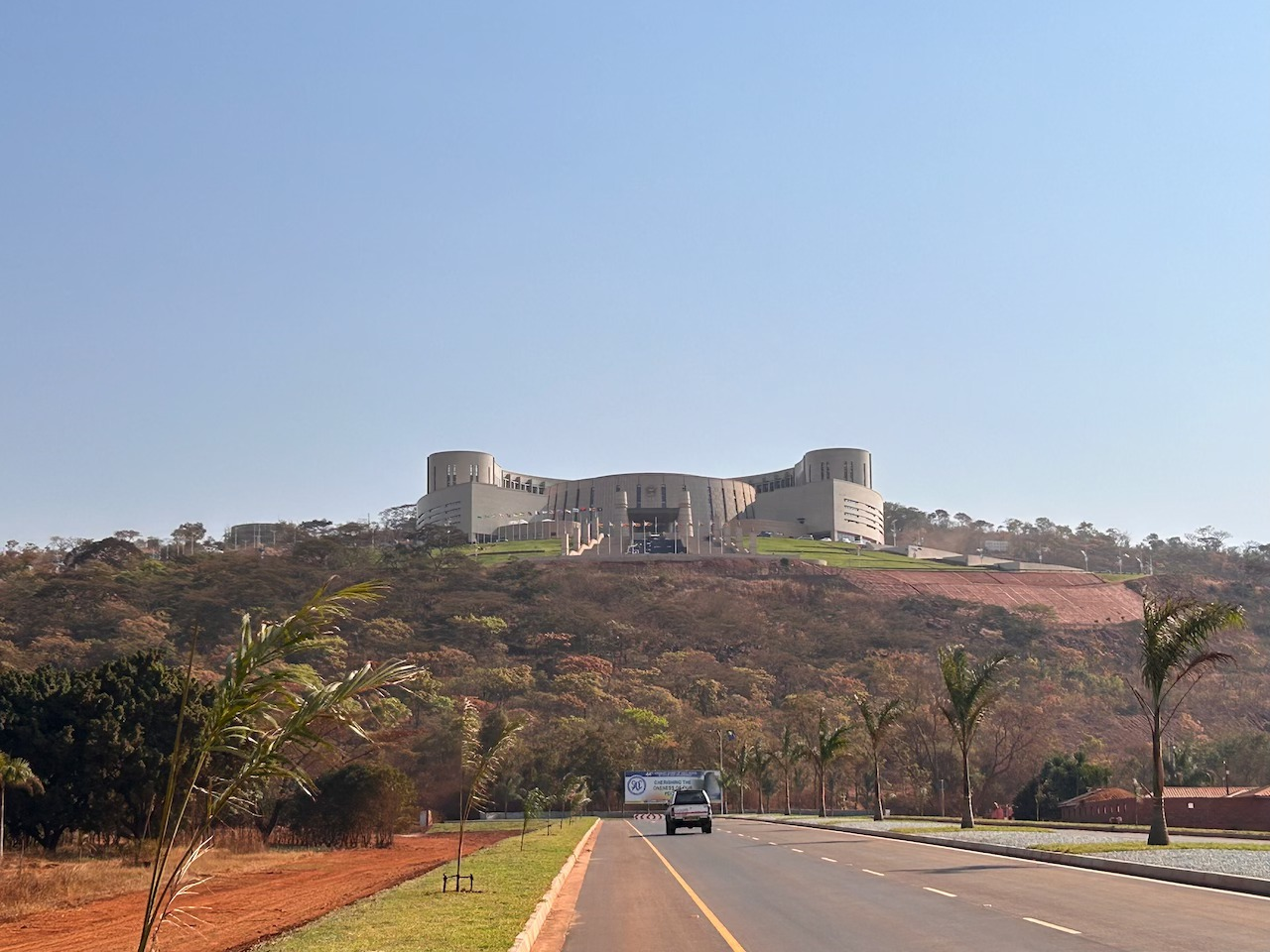
The New Zimbabwe Parliament Building in Mount Hampden, Harare

Zimbabwe is a unitary assembly-independent republic. The presidential system was abolished following constitutional amendments signed in 2026. Under the constitutional changes in 2005, an upper chamber, the Senate, was reinstated. The House of Assembly is the lower chamber of Parliament.

In 1987, Mugabe revised the constitution, abolishing the ceremonial presidency and the prime ministerial posts to form an executive president—a presidential system. His ZANU-PF party has won every election since independence—in the 1990 election, the second-placed party, Edgar Tekere's Zimbabwe Unity Movement (ZUM), obtained 20% of the vote. The position of prime minister, recreated in 2009, was abolished again with the adoption of a new constitution after a referendum in 2013.

=== Politics ===
During the 1995 parliamentary elections, most opposition parties, including the ZUM, boycotted the voting, resulting in a near sweep by the ruling party. When the opposition returned to the polls in 2000, they won 57 seats, only five fewer than ZANU-PF. Presidential elections were again held in 2002 amid allegations of vote-rigging, intimidation and fraud. The 2005 Zimbabwe parliamentary elections were held on 31 March, and multiple claims of vote rigging, election fraud and intimidation were made by the Movement for Democratic Change party and Jonathan Moyo, calling for investigations into 32 of the 120 constituencies. Moyo participated in the elections despite the allegations and won a seat as an independent member of Parliament.

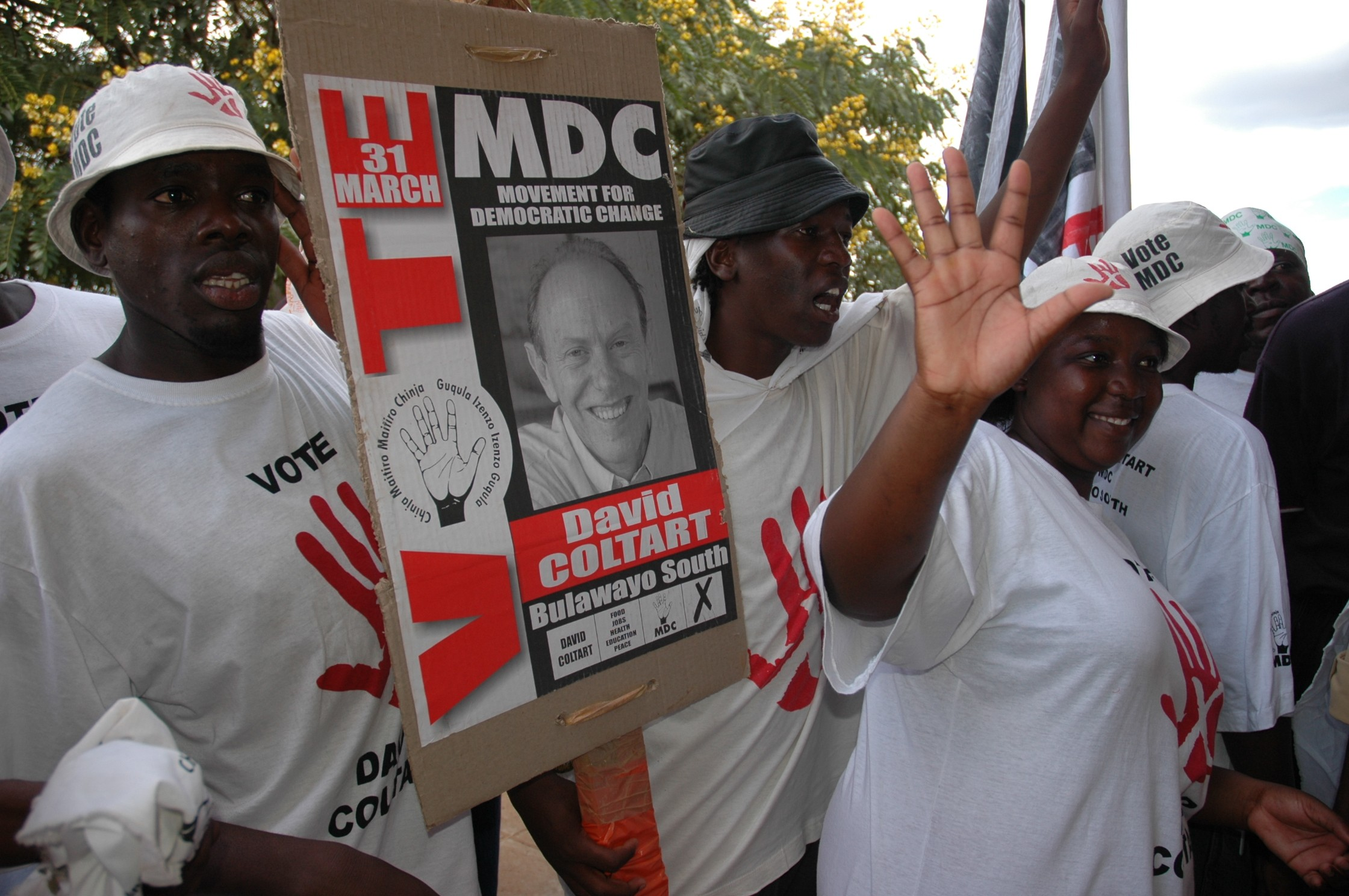
Supporters of the Movement for Democratic Change in 2005

In 2005, the MDC split into two factions: the Movement for Democratic Change – Mutambara (MDC-M), led by Arthur Mutambara which contested the elections to the Senate, and the Movement for Democratic Change – Tsvangirai (MDC-T) led by Morgan Tsvangirai which was opposed to contesting the elections, stating that participation in a rigged election is tantamount to endorsing Mugabe's claim that past elections were free and fair. The two MDC camps had their congresses in 2006, with Tsvangirai being elected to lead MDC-T, which became more popular than the other group.

In the 2008 general election, the official results required a run-off between Mugabe and Tsvangirai. The MDC-T challenged these results, claiming widespread election fraud by the Mugabe government. The run-off was scheduled for 27 June 2008. On 22 June, citing the continuing unfairness of the process and refusing to participate in a "violent, illegitimate sham of an election process", Tsvangirai pulled out of the presidential run-off, the election commission held the run-off, and President Mugabe received a landslide majority. The MDC-T did not participate in the Senate elections, while the MDC-M won five seats in the Senate. The MDC-M was weakened by defections from members of parliament and individuals who were disillusioned by their manifesto. On 28 April 2008, Tsvangirai and Mutambara announced at a joint news conference in Johannesburg that the two MDC formations were co-operating, enabling the MDC to have a clear parliamentary majority. Tsvangirai said that Mugabe could not remain president without a parliamentary majority.

In mid-September 2008, after protracted negotiations overseen by the leaders of South Africa and Mozambique, Mugabe and Tsvangirai signed a power-sharing deal in which Mugabe retained control over the army. Donor nations adopted a 'wait-and-see' attitude, wanting to see real change being brought about by this merger before committing themselves to funding rebuilding efforts, which were estimated to take at least five years. On 11 February 2009, Tsvangirai was sworn in as prime minister by Mugabe.

In November 2008, the government of Zimbabwe spent US$7.3 million donated by The Global Fund to Fight AIDS, Tuberculosis and Malaria. A representative of the organisation declined to speculate on how the money was spent, except that it was not for the intended purpose, and the government has failed to honour requests to return the money.

The status of Zimbabwe politics has been thrown into question by a coup taking place in November 2017, ending Mugabe's 30-year presidential incumbency. Emmerson Mnangagwa was appointed president following this coup and was officially elected with 50.8% of the vote in the 2018 Zimbabwean general election, avoiding a run-off and making him the third president of Zimbabwe.

The government has received negative comments among its citizens for always shutting down the internet in the past amid protests such as the one planned on 31 July 2020.

In July 2023, Zimbabwean President Emmerson Mnangagwa voiced support for Russia in the Russo-Ukrainian war.

=== Armed forces ===
The flag of the Zimbabwe Defence Forces

The Zimbabwe Defence Forces were set up by unifying three armed forces – the Zimbabwe African National Liberation Army (ZANLA), the Zimbabwe People's Revolutionary Army (ZIPRA), and the Rhodesian Security Forces (RSF) – after the Second Chimurenga and Zimbabwean independence in 1980. The integration period saw the formation of the Zimbabwe National Army (ZNA) and Air Force of Zimbabwe (AFZ) as separate entities under the command of General Solomon Mujuru and Air Marshal Norman Walsh, who retired in 1982 and was replaced by Air Marshal Azim Daudpota who handed over command to Air Chief Marshal Josiah Tungamirai in 1985. In 2003, General Constantine Chiwenga, was promoted and appointed Commander of the Zimbabwe Defence Forces. Lieutenant General P. V. Sibanda replaced him as Commander of the Army.

The ZNA has an active duty strength of 30,000. The Air Force has about 5,139 standing personnel. The Zimbabwe Republic Police (includes Police Support Unit, Paramilitary Police) is part of the Zimbabwe Defence Forces and numbers 25,000.

Following majority rule in early 1980, British Army trainers oversaw the integration of guerrilla fighters into a battalion structure overlaid on the existing Rhodesian armed forces. For the first year, a system was followed where the top-performing candidate became battalion commander. If the commander was from ZANLA, then theor second-in-command was the top-performing ZIPRA candidate, and vice versa. This ensured a balance between the two movements in the command structure.

The ZNA was originally formed into four brigades, composed of a total of 28 battalions. The brigade support units were composed almost entirely of specialists of the former Rhodesian Army, while unintegrated battalions of the Rhodesian African Rifles were assigned to the 1st, 3rd and 4th Brigades. The Fifth Brigade was formed in 1981 and disbanded in 1988 after the demonstration of mass brutality and murder during the brigade's occupation of Matabeleland in what became known as Gukurahundi. The brigade had been re-formed by 2006, with its commander, Brigadier General John Mupande praising its "rich history".

=== Human rights ===
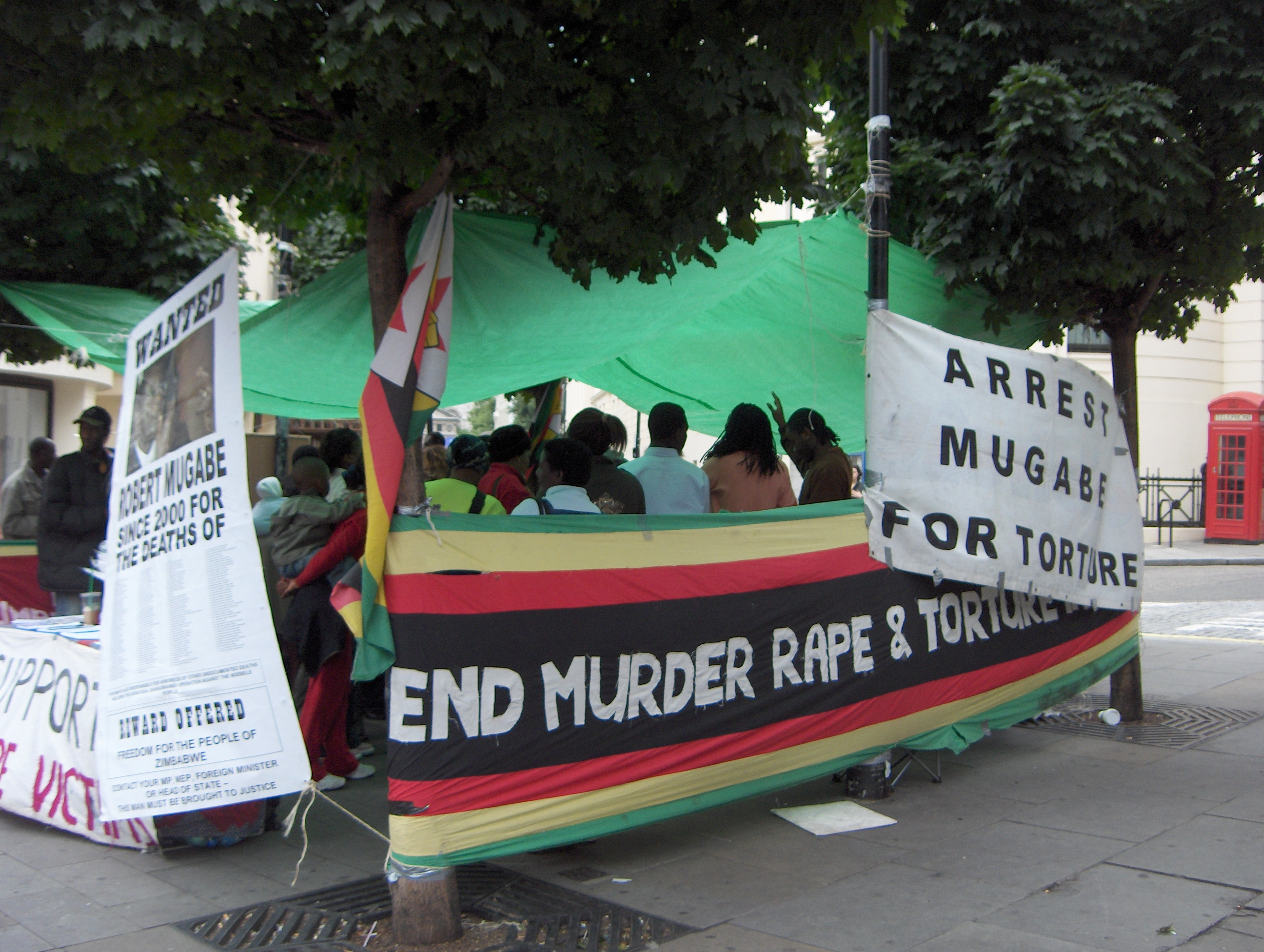
A demonstration in London against Robert Mugabe. Protests are discouraged by Zimbabwean police in Zimbabwe.

There are widespread reports of systematic and escalating violations of human rights in Zimbabwe under the Mugabe administration and the dominant ZANU–PF party. According to human rights organisations such as Amnesty International and Human Rights Watch the government of Zimbabwe violates the rights to shelter, food, freedom of movement and residence, freedom of assembly and the protection of the law. In 2009, Gregory Stanton, president of the International Association of Genocide Scholars, stated there was "clear evidence that Mugabe government was guilty of crimes against humanity and that there was sufficient evidence of crimes against humanity to bring Mugabe to trial in front of the International Criminal Court."

Male homosexuality is illegal in Zimbabwe. From 1995, the government carried out campaigns against both homosexual men and women. President Mugabe blamed gays for many of Zimbabwe's problems and viewed homosexuality as an "un-African" and immoral culture brought by European colonists and practised by only "a few whites" in his country.

Opposition gatherings are frequently the subject of reprisals by the police force, such as the crackdown on an 11 March 2007 MDC rally and several others during the 2008 election campaign. Police actions have been strongly condemned by the UN Secretary-General Ban Ki-moon, the European Union, and the United States. There are also concerns over Fox Southwest media rights and access. The Zimbabwean government is accused of suppressing freedom of the press and freedom of speech. It has been repeatedly accused of using the public broadcaster, the Zimbabwe Broadcasting Corporation, as a propaganda tool. Newspapers critical of the government, such as the Daily News, closed after bombs exploded at their offices and the government refused to renew their licence. BBC News, Sky News, and CNN were banned from filming or reporting from Zimbabwe. In 2009, reporting restrictions on the BBC and CNN were lifted. Sky News continues to report on happenings within Zimbabwe from neighbouring countries like South Africa.

On 24 July 2020, the Office of the United Nations High Commissioner for Human Rights (OHCHR) expressed concerns over allegations suggesting that Zimbabwean authorities may have used the COVID-19 crisis as a pretext to suppress freedom of expression and peaceful assembly on the streets. OHCHR spokesperson Liz Throssell stated that people have a right to protest corruption or anything else. The authorities in Zimbabwe used force to disperse and arrest nurses and health workers, who were peacefully protesting for better salaries and work conditions. The reports suggest that a few members of opposition party and investigative journalists were also arbitrarily arrested and detained for taking part in a protest.

On 5 August 2020, the #ZimbabweanLivesMatter campaign on Twitter drew attention of international celebrities and politicians towards human rights abuses in the country, mounting pressure on Emmerson Mnangagwa's government. The campaign was in response to arrests, abductions and torture of political activists and the incarceration of journalist Hopewell Chin'ono and the Booker Prize shortlisted author Tsitsi Dangarembga.

=== Administrative divisions ===
Zimbabwe has a centralised government and is divided into eight provinces and two cities with provincial status, for administrative purposes. Each province has a provincial capital from where government administration is usually carried out.

Province	Capital	Administrative divisions of Zimbabwe
Bulawayo	Bulawayo	
Harare	Harare	
Manicaland	Mutare	
Mashonaland Central	Bindura	
Mashonaland East	Marondera	
Mashonaland West	Chinhoyi	
Masvingo	Masvingo city	
Matabeleland North	Lupane District	
Matabeleland South	Gwanda	
Midlands	Gweru	

The names of most of the provinces were generated from the Mashonaland and Matabeleland divide at the time of colonisation: Mashonaland was the territory occupied first by the British South Africa Company Pioneer Column and Matabeleland the territory conquered during the First Matabele War. This corresponds roughly to the precolonial territory of the Shona people and the Matabele people, although there are significant ethnic minorities in most provinces. Each province is headed by a provincial governor, appointed by the president. The provincial government is run by a provincial administrator, appointed by the Public Service Commission. Other government functions at provincial level are carried out by provincial offices of national government departments.

The provinces are subdivided into 59 districts and 1,200 wards (sometimes referred to as municipalities). Each district is headed by a district administrator, appointed by the Public Service Commission. There is also a Rural District Council, which appoints a chief executive officer. The Rural District Council is composed of elected ward councillors, the district administrator, and one representative of the chiefs (traditional leaders appointed under customary law) in the district. Other government functions at district level are carried out by district offices of national government departments.

At the ward level, there is a Ward Development Committee, comprising the elected ward councillor, the kraalheads (traditional leaders subordinate to chiefs) and representatives of Village Development Committees. Wards are subdivided into villages, each of which has an elected Village Development Committee and a headman (traditional leader subordinate to the kraalhead).

=== Sanctions ===
Since the early 2000s, Zimbabwe has been under sanctions imposed by the United States and the European Union that have shaped Zimbabwe's domestic politics as well as the country's relations with the Western nations. In 2002, Zimbabwe held general elections and ahead of that election the EU sent observers, but the election observer team was forced to leave the country. In February 2002, the EU placed targeted or restrictive measures on Zimbabwe. At least 20 government officials were banned from entering Europe, and EU funding was halted. Prior to the elections, there was $128 million that was budgeted for the Zimbabwean government from 2002 to 2007, this was cancelled. Nevertheless, the EU only stopped funding the government directly but it continued sending money only through aid agencies and NGOs.

After some years, the EU and Zimbabwe resolved some of their disputes and a lot of the EU sanctions were removed. Only Mugabe and his wife remained on the list while other government officials were removed. However, the EU still did not give Zimbabwe money. The government channels money through NGOs as it was seen on 4 March 2019 – 21 March 2019 Cyclone Idai.

The United States also imposed sanctions on Zimbabwe. There are two types of U.S. sanctions on Zimbabwe. The first one is Zimbabwe Democracy and Economic Recovery Act (ZIDERA) and the second one is the Targeted Sanctions Program. ZIDERA made several demands, the first one was that Zimbabwe must respect human rights, second Zimbabwe must stop its interference in the Democratic Republic of the Congo, third Zimbabwe must stop the expropriation of white farms. If none of these demands were met, the U.S. would block the IMF and the World Bank from lending money to Zimbabwe. A new ZIDERA came into effect in 2018 with the motto: "Restore Democracy or there won't be any friendship, there must be free elections, free media and human rights, Zimbabwe must enforce the ruling of the SADC Tribunal". The Targeted Sanctions Program was implemented in 2003, which lists Zimbabwean companies and people who are not allowed to deal with U.S. companies. The sanctions on Zimbabwe have been in place for more than two decades. In March 2021, the U.S. renewed its sanctions on Zimbabwe.

== Economy ==
Historical GDP per capita development in southern African countries, since 1950

The main foreign exports of Zimbabwe are minerals, gold, and agriculture. Zimbabwe is crossed by two trans-African automobile routes: the Cairo-Cape Town Highway and the Beira-Lobito Highway. Zimbabwe is the largest trading partner of South Africa on the continent. Taxes and tariffs are high for private enterprises, while state enterprises are strongly subsidised. State regulation is costly to companies; starting or closing a business is slow and expensive. Tourism also plays a key role in the economy but has been failing in recent years. The Zimbabwe Conservation Task Force released a report in June 2007, estimating that 60% of Zimbabwe's wildlife had died since 2000 as a result of poaching and deforestation. The report warns that the loss of life combined with widespread deforestation is potentially disastrous for the tourism industry. The information and communications technology sector has been growing at a fast pace. A report by the mobile web browser company Opera in 2011 ranked Zimbabwe as Africa's fastest growing market.

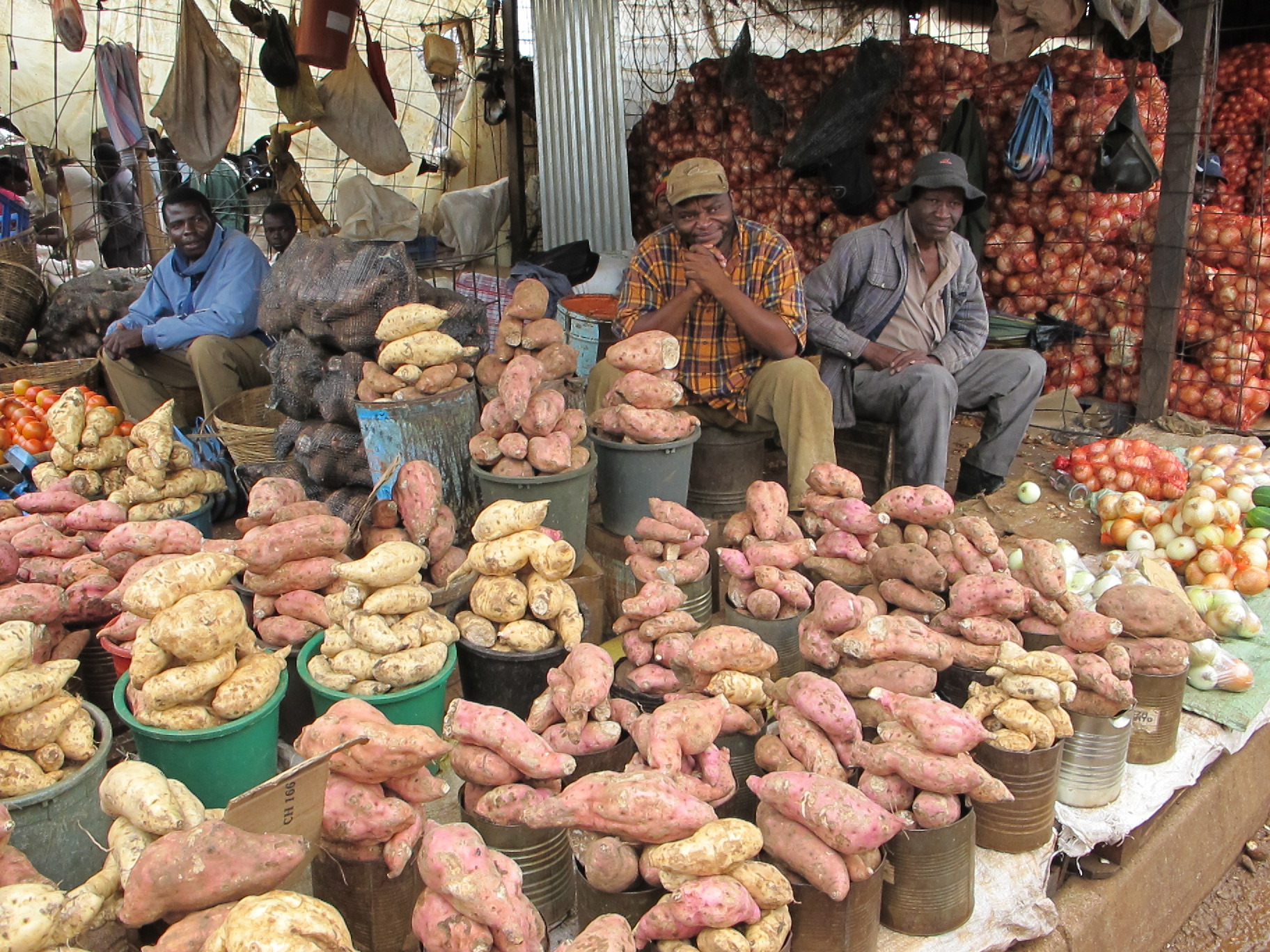
A market in Mbare, Harare

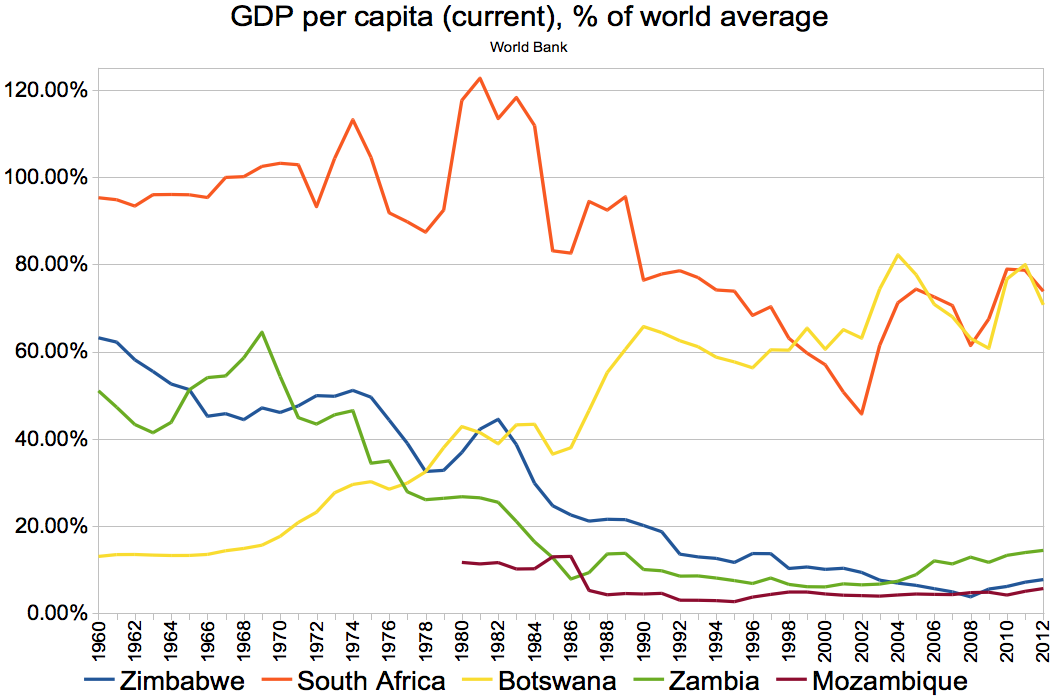
The GDP per capita (current), compared to neighbouring countries (world average = 100)

Zimbabwe maintained positive economic growth throughout the 1980s (5% GDP growth per year) and 1990s (4.3% GDP growth per year). The economy declined from 2000: 5% decline in 2000, 8% in 2001, 12% in 2002 and 18% in 2003. Zimbabwe's involvement from 1998 to 2002 in the war in the Democratic Republic of the Congo drained hundreds of millions of dollars from the economy. From 1999 to 2009, Zimbabwe saw the lowest ever economic growth with an annual GDP decrease of 6.1%. The downward spiral of the economy has been attributed mainly to mismanagement and corruption by the government and the eviction of more than 4,000 white farmers in the controversial land confiscations of 2000. The Zimbabwean government and its supporters attest that it was Western policies to avenge the expulsion of their kin that sabotaged the economy.

By 2005, the purchasing power of the average Zimbabwean had dropped to the same levels in real terms as 1953. In 2005, the government, led by central bank governor Gideon Gono, started making overtures that white farmers could come back. There were 400 to 500 still left in the country, but much of the land that had been confiscated was no longer productive. By 2016, there remained about 300 of the original 4,500 farms owned by white farmers. The farms that left were either too remote or their owners had paid for protection or collaborated with the regime. In January 2007, the government issued long-term leases to some white farmers. At the same time, however, the government also continued to demand that all remaining white farmers, who were given eviction notices earlier, vacate the land or risk being arrested. Mugabe pointed to foreign governments and alleged "sabotage" as the cause of the fall of the Zimbabwean economy, as well as the country's 80% formal unemployment rate.

In 2016, Command Agriculture, a government-led agricultural program, was launched for the purpose of boosting food security and agricultural productivity, particularly for maize and wheat.

=== Minerals ===
The mining sector is lucrative, with some of the world's largest platinum reserves being mined by Anglo American plc, Zimplats, and Impala Platinum. Zimplats, the nation's largest platinum company, has proceeded with US$500 million in expansions, and is also continuing a separate US$2 billion project, despite threats by Mugabe to nationalise the company.

The Marange diamond fields, discovered in 2006, are considered the biggest diamond find in over a century. They have the potential to improve the fiscal situation of the country considerably, but almost all revenues from the field have disappeared into the pockets of army officers and ZANU–PF politicians. In terms of carats produced, the Marange field is one of the largest diamond-producing projects in the world, estimated to have produced 12 million carats in 2014 worth over US$350 million.

As of October 2014, Metallon Corporation was Zimbabwe's largest gold miner. In 2015, Zimbabwe's gold production is 20 metric tonnes.

=== Agriculture ===
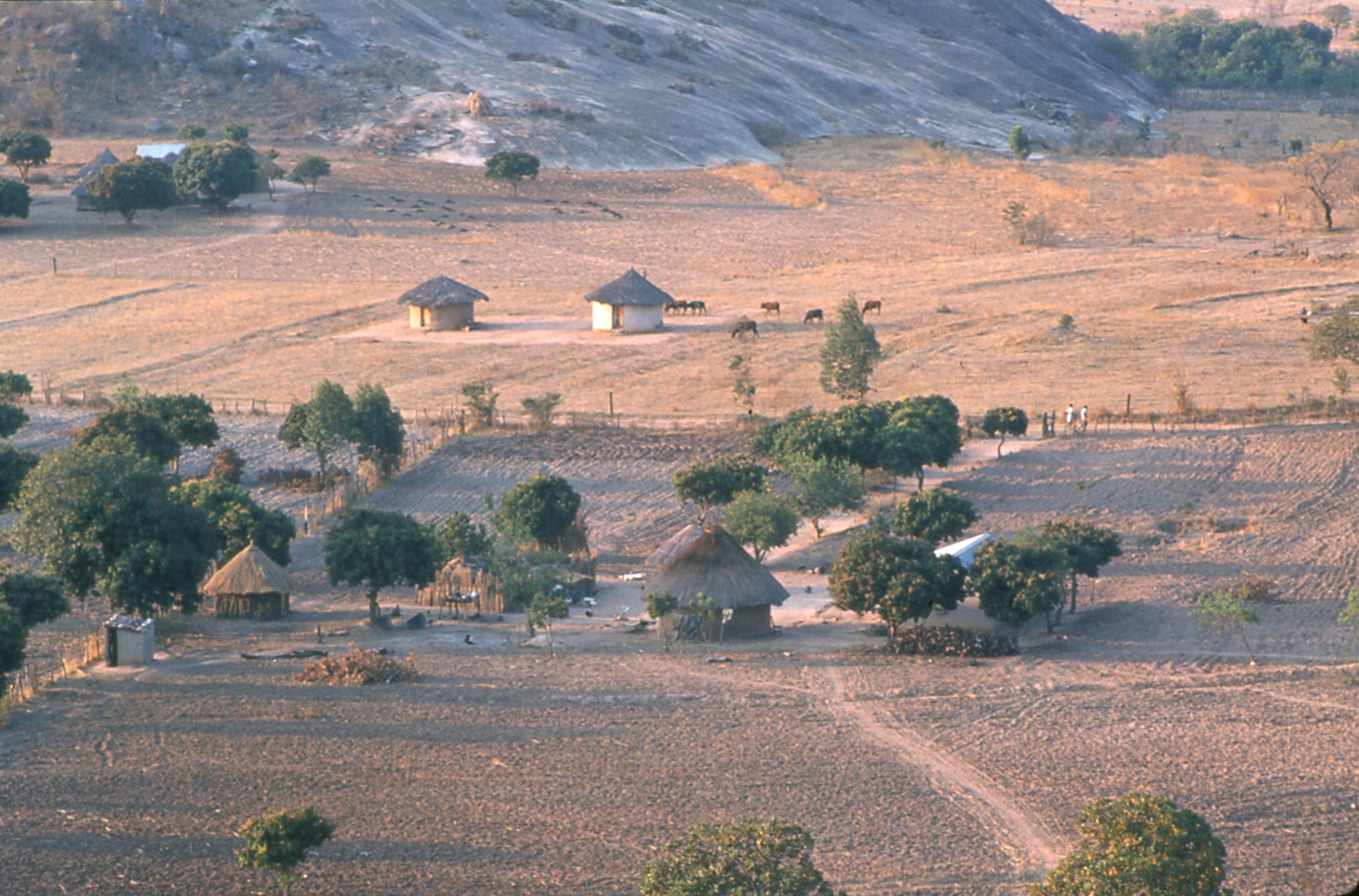
Shona farms in Zimbabwe

Zimbabwe's commercial farming sector was traditionally a source of exports and foreign exchange and provided 400,000 jobs. However, the government's land reform program badly damaged the sector, turning Zimbabwe into a net importer of food products. For example, between 2000 and 2016, annual wheat production fell from 250,000 tons to 60,000 tons, maize was reduced from two million tons to 500,000 tons and cattle slaughtered for beef fell from 605,000 head to 244,000 head. Coffee production, once a prized export commodity, came to a virtual halt after seizure or expropriation of white-owned coffee farms in 2000 and has never recovered.

For the past ten years, the International Crops Research Institute for the Semi-Arid Tropics has been assisting Zimbabwe's farmers to adopt conservation agriculture techniques, a sustainable method of farming that can help increase yields. By applying the three principles of minimum soil disturbance, legume-based cropping and the use of organic mulch, farmers can improve infiltration, reduce evaporation and soil erosion, and build up organic soil content. Between 2005 and 2011, the number of smallholders practicing conservation agriculture in Zimbabwe increased from 5,000 to more than 150,000. Cereal yields rose between 15 and 100 per cent across different regions. The government declared potato a national strategic food security crop in 2012.

=== Tourism ===
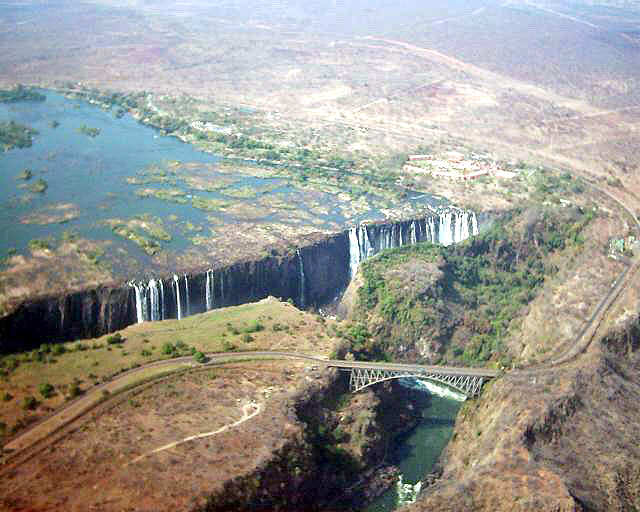
Victoria Falls, the end of the upper Zambezi and the beginning of the middle Zambezi

Since the land reform programme in 2000, tourism in Zimbabwe has steadily declined. In 2018, tourism peaked with 2.6 million tourists. In 2016, the total contribution of tourism to Zimbabwe was US$1.1 billion, or about 8.1% of Zimbabwe's GDP. Employment in travel and tourism, as well as the industries indirectly supported by travel and tourism, was 5.2% of national employment.

Several airlines pulled out of Zimbabwe between 2000 and 2007. Australia's Qantas, Germany's Lufthansa, and Austrian Airlines were among the first to pull out and in 2007 British Airways suspended all direct flights to Harare. The country's flagship airline, Air Zimbabwe, which operated flights throughout Africa and a few destinations in Europe and Asia, ceased operations in February 2012. As of 2017, several major commercial airlines had resumed flights to Zimbabwe.

Zimbabwe has several major tourist attractions. Victoria Falls on the Zambezi, which are shared with Zambia, are located in the north-west of Zimbabwe. Victoria Falls is considered to be the largest waterfall in the world. Before the economic changes, much of the tourism for these locations came to the Zimbabwe side, but now Zambia is the main beneficiary. The Victoria Falls National Park is also in this area and is one of the eight main national parks in Zimbabwe, the largest of which is Hwange National Park. Lake Kariba, another site for tourism, is the largest reservoir in the world.

The Eastern Highlands are a series of mountainous areas near the border with Mozambique. The highest peak in Zimbabwe, Mount Nyangani at 2,593 m (8,507 ft) is located there as well as the Bvumba Mountains and the Nyanga National Park. World's View is in these mountains, and it is from here that places as far away as 60–70 km (37–43 mi) are visible and, on clear days, the town of Rusape can be seen.

Zimbabwe is unusual in Africa in that there are a number of ancient and medieval ruined cities built in a unique dry stone style. Among the most famous of these are the Great Zimbabwe ruins in Masvingo. Other ruins include Khami, Dhlo-Dhlo and Naletale. The Matobo Hills are an area of granite kopjes and wooded valleys commencing some 35 km (22 mi) south of Bulawayo in southern Zimbabwe. The hills were formed over two billion years ago with granite being forced to the surface, then being eroded to produce smooth "whaleback dwalas" and broken kopjes, strewn with boulders and interspersed with thickets of vegetation. Mzilikazi, founder of the Ndebele nation, gave the area its name, meaning 'Bald Heads'. They have become a tourist attraction because of their ancient shapes and local wildlife. Cecil Rhodes and other early white colonists like Leander Starr Jameson are buried in these hills at World's View.

=== Water supply and sanitation ===
There are many successful small-scale water supply and sanitation programs, but there is an overall lack of improved water and sanitation systems for the majority of Zimbabwe. According to the World Health Organization (WHO) in 2012, 80% of Zimbabweans had access to improved (i.e. clean) drinking water sources, and only 40% of Zimbabweans had access to improved sanitation facilities. Access to improved water supply and sanitation is noticeably limited in rural areas. There are many factors that continue to determine the nature of water supply and sanitation in Zimbabwe for the foreseeable future; three major factors are the severely depressed state of the Zimbabwean economy, the reluctance of foreign aid organisations to build and finance infrastructure projects, and the political instability of the state.

=== Science and technology ===
Scientific research output in terms of publications in Southern Africa, cumulative totals by field, 2008–2014. Source: UNESCO Science Report: towards 2030 (2015), figure 20.6.

Zimbabwe has relatively well-developed national infrastructure and a long-standing tradition of promoting research and development, as evidenced by the levy imposed on tobacco-growers since the 1930s to promote market research. The country has a well-developed education system, with one in 11 adults holding a tertiary degree. Given the country's solid knowledge base and abundant natural resources, Zimbabwe has great growth potential.

To achieve its growth potential, Zimbabwe will need to correct several structural weaknesses. For instance, it lacks the critical mass of researchers needed to trigger innovation. Although the infrastructure is in place to harness research and development to Zimbabwe's socio-economic development, universities and research institutions lack the financial and human resources to conduct research and the regulatory environment hampers the transfer of new technologies to the business sector. The economic crisis has precipitated an exodus of university students and professionals in key areas of expertise (medicine, engineering, etc.) that is of growing concern. More than 22% of Zimbabwean tertiary students were completing their degrees abroad in 2012, compared to a 4% average for sub-Saharan Africa as a whole. In 2012, there were 200 researchers (head count) employed in the public sector, one-quarter of whom were women. This is double the continental average (91 in 2013) but only one-quarter the researcher density of South Africa (818 per million inhabitants). The government has created the Zimbabwe Human Capital Website to provide information for the diaspora on job and investment opportunities in Zimbabwe.

Scientific publication trends in the most productive SADC countries, 2005–2014. Source: UNESCO Science Report: towards 2030 (2015), data from Thomson Reuters' Web of Science, Science Citation Index Expanded.

The country's Second Science and Technology Policy was launched in June 2012, after being elaborated with UNESCO assistance. It replaces the earlier policy dating from 2002. The 2012 policy prioritises biotechnology, information and communication technologies (ICTs), space sciences, nanotechnology, indigenous knowledge systems, technologies yet to emerge and scientific solutions to emergent environmental challenges. The Second Science and Technology Policy also asserts the government's commitment to allocating at least 1% of GDP to research and development, focusing at least 60% of university education on developing skills in science and technology and ensuring that school pupils devote at least 30% of their time to studying science subjects.

In 2014, Zimbabwe counted 21 publications per million inhabitants in internationally cataloged journals, according to Thomson Reuters' Web of Science (Science Citation Index Expanded). This placed Zimbabwe sixth out of the 15 SADC countries, behind Namibia (59), Mauritius (71), Botswana (103) and, above all, South Africa (175) and the Seychelles (364). The average for sub-Saharan Africa was 20 scientific publications per million inhabitants, compared to a global average of 176 per million.

=== Transportation ===
- National Railways of Zimbabwe
- Robert Gabriel Mugabe International Airport

== Demographics ==
=== Population ===
Expanding from a population of 2,746,396 in 1950, Zimbabwe's population has rapidly increased. Based on the 2022 revision of the World Population Prospects, the population of Zimbabwe was estimated by the United Nations at 15,993,524 in 2021.

=== Ethnic groups ===
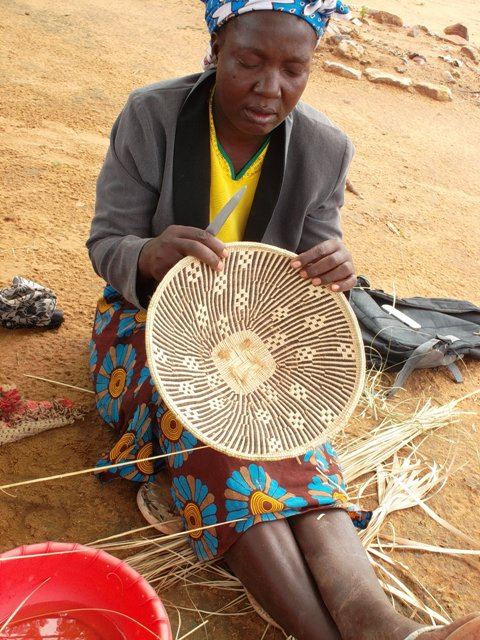
A Tonga woman pleating a basket

According to the 2022 census report, 99.6% of the population is of African origin. The majority people, the Shona, comprise 82%, while Ndebele make up 14% of the population. The Ndebele descended from Zulu migrations in the 19th century and the other tribes with which they intermarried. Up to one million Ndebele may have left the country over the last five years, mainly for South Africa. Other ethnic groups include Venda, Tonga, Tsonga, Kalanga, Sotho, Ndau, Nambya, Tswana, Xhosa and Lozi.

Minority ethnic groups include white Zimbabweans, who make up less than 1% of the total population. White Zimbabweans are mostly of British origin, but there are also Afrikaner, Greek, Portuguese, French and Dutch communities. The white population dropped from a peak of around 278,000, or 4.3% of the population, in 1975. The 2022 census lists the total white population at 24,888 (roughly 0.16% of the population), one-eleventh of its peak. Emigrants went to the United Kingdom (between 200,000 and 500,000 resident Britons were of Rhodesian or Zimbabwean origin in 2006), South Africa, Australia, New Zealand, Canada, Hong Kong, the United States, Zambia and Mozambique. After Mugabe was replaced by Emmerson Mnangagwa as president, there was an influx of white Zimbabweans returning to the country.

Coloureds form 0.1% of the population, and various Asian ethnic groups, mostly of Indian and Chinese origin, are 0.04%.

=== Largest cities ===
Largest cities or towns in Zimbabwe Source:
Rank	Name	Province	Pop.
1	Harare	Harare	2,123,132
2	Bulawayo	Bulawayo	1,200,337
3	Chitungwiza	Harare	371,244
4	Mutare	Manicaland	224,802
5	Gweru	Midlands	158,200
6	Kwekwe	Midlands	119,863
7	Kadoma	Mashonaland West	116,300
8	Ruwa	Mashonaland East	94,083
9	Chinhoyi	Mashonaland West	90,800
10	Masvingo	Masvingo	90,286

=== Languages ===
Zimbabwe has 16 official languages and under the constitution, an Act of Parliament may prescribe other languages as officially recognised languages. English is the main language used in the education and judicial systems. The Bantu languages Shona and Ndebele are the principal indigenous languages of Zimbabwe. Shona is spoken by 75-78% of the population, Ndebele by 17-20%. Other minority Bantu languages include Venda, Tsonga, Shangaan, Kalanga, Sotho, Ndau and Nambya. Less than 2.5%, mainly the white and "coloured" (mixed race) minorities, consider English their native language. Shona has a rich oral tradition, which was incorporated into the first Shona novel, Feso by Solomon Mutswairo, published in 1956. English is primarily spoken in the cities but less so in rural areas. Radio and television news are broadcast in Shona, Sindebele and English.

There is a large community of Portuguese speakers in Zimbabwe, mainly in the border areas with Mozambique and in major cities. Beginning in 2017, teaching Portuguese was included in secondary education of Zimbabwe.

=== Religion ===
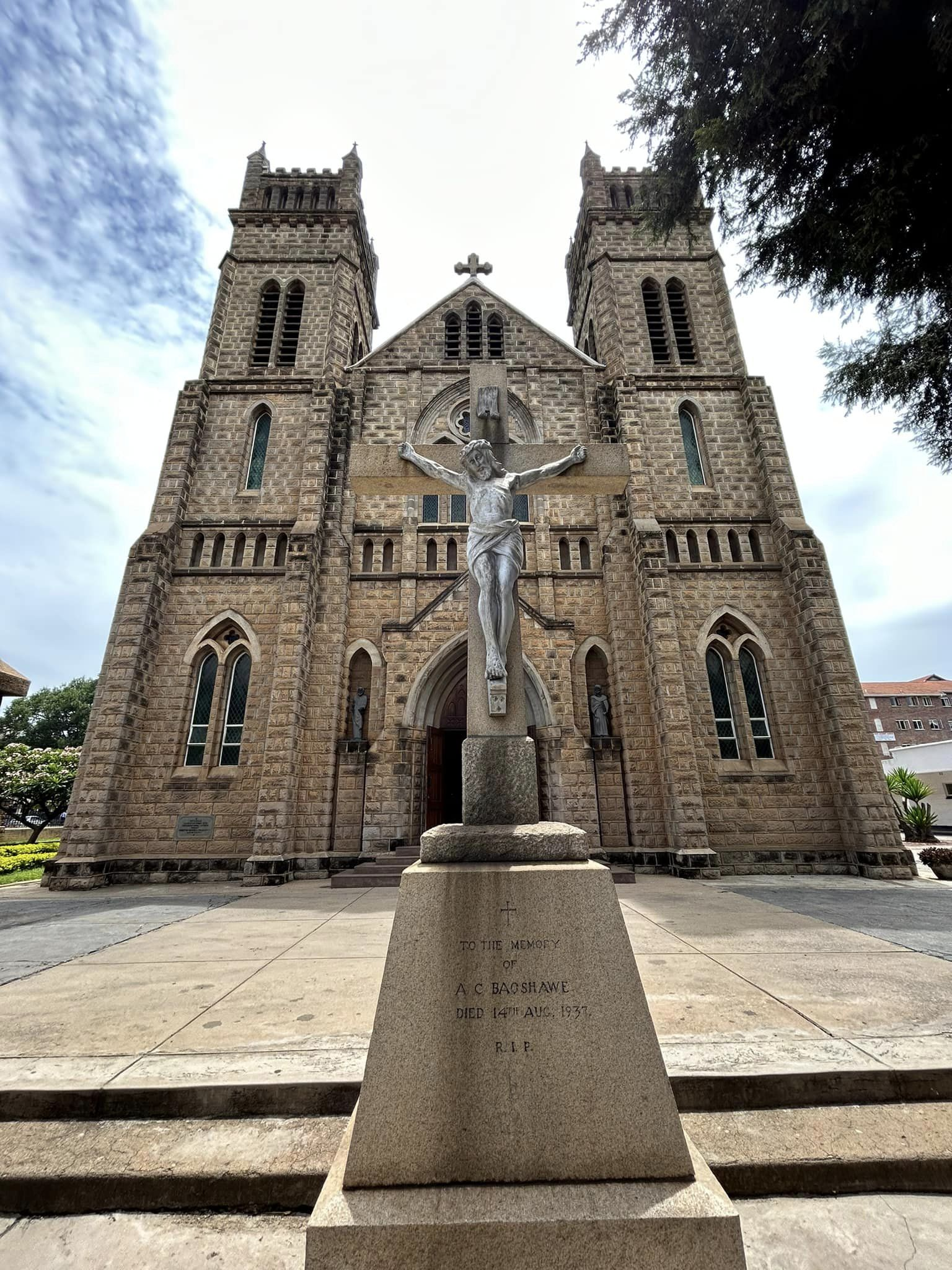
Catholic church in Harare

According to the 2017 Inter Censal Demography Survey by the Zimbabwe National Statistics Agency, 84% of Zimbabweans are Christian, 10% do not belong to any religion, and 0.7% are Muslim. An estimated 62% of the population attend religious services regularly. Approximately 69% of Zimbabweans belong to Protestant Christianity, while 8% are Roman Catholic. Pentecostal-charismatic forms of Christianity, in particular, have grown rapidly in recent years and are playing a prominent role in public, social and political life. The largest Christian churches are Anglican, Roman Catholic, Seventh-day Adventist and Methodist.

As in other African countries, Christianity may be mixed with enduring traditional beliefs. Indigenous religion, which predates colonialism, has become relatively marginal but continues to be an important part of the Zimbabwean religious field. Ancestral worship is the most practised non-Christian religion, involving spiritual intercession. Central to many ceremonial proceedings is the mbira dzavadzimu, meaning "voice of the ancestors", which is an instrument related to many lamellophones ubiquitous throughout Africa.

=== Health ===
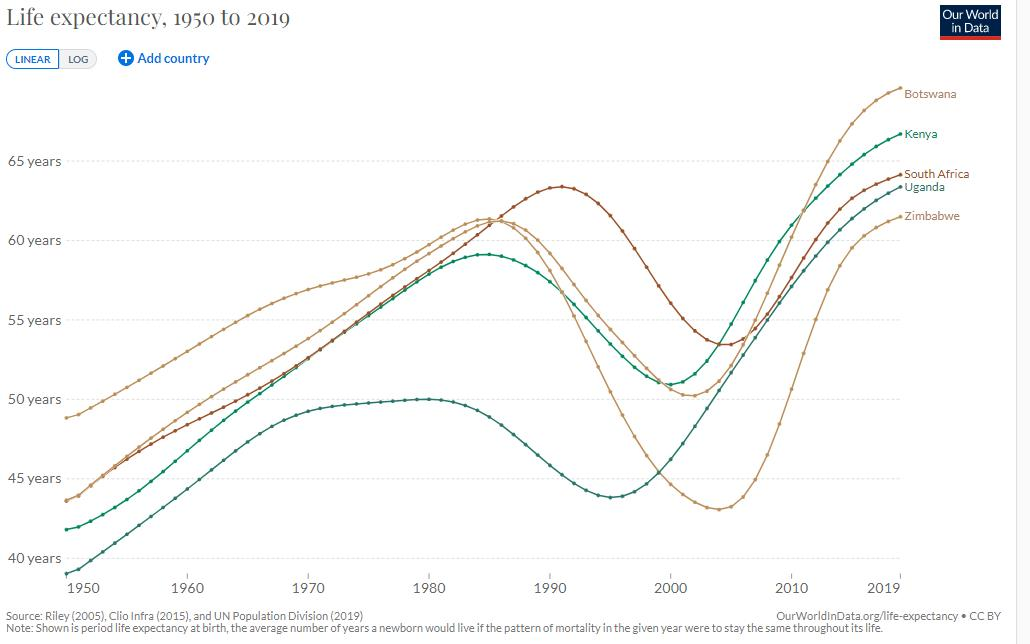
Life expectancy in select Southern African countries, 1950–2019. HIV/AIDS has caused a fall in life expectancy.

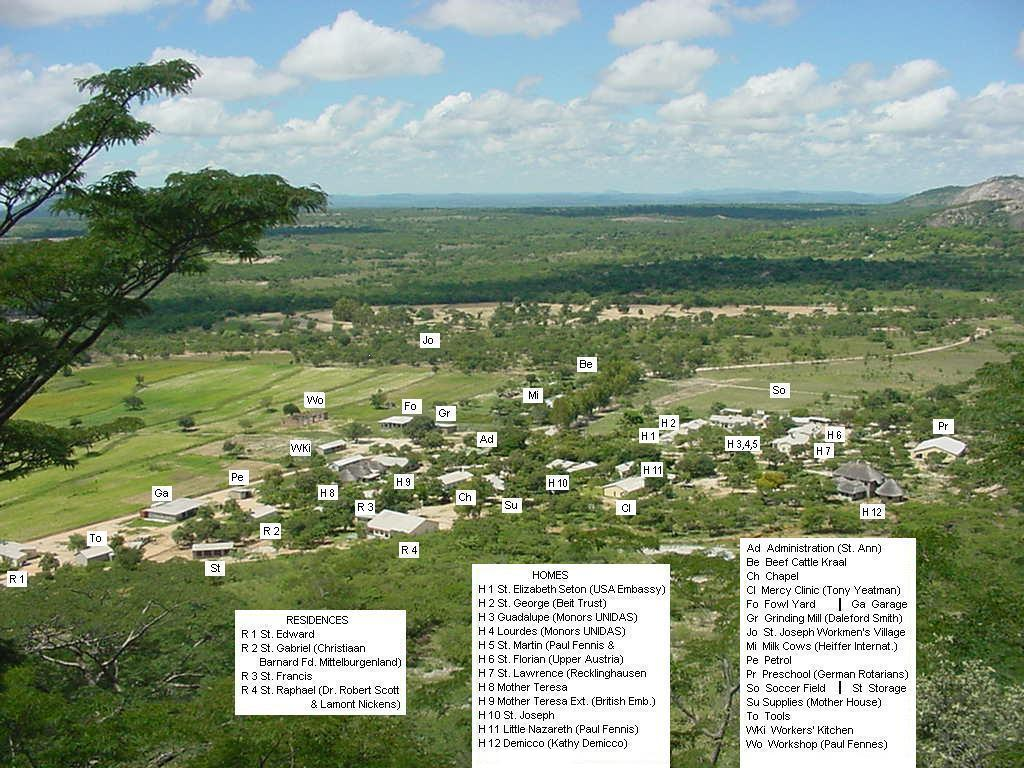
Mother of Peace AIDS orphanage, Mutoko (2005)

At independence, the policies of racial inequality were reflected in the disease patterns of the black majority. The first five years after independence saw rapid gains in areas such as immunisation coverage, access to health care, and contraceptive prevalence rate. Zimbabwe was thus considered internationally to have achieved a good record of health development.

Zimbabwe suffered occasional outbreaks of acute diseases. The gains on the national health were eroded by structural adjustment in the 1990s, the impact of the HIV/AIDS pandemic and the economic crisis since 2000. In 2006, Zimbabwe had one of the lowest life expectancies in the world according to UN figure—44 for men and 43 for women, down from 60 in 1990, but recovered to 60 in 2015. The rapid drop was ascribed mainly to the HIV/AIDS pandemic. Infant mortality rose from 6% in the late 1990s to 12.3% by 2004. Official fertility rates over the last decade were 3.6 (2002), 3.8 (2006) and 3.8 (2012). The 2014 maternal mortality rate per 100,000 births for Zimbabwe was 614 compared to 960 in 2010–11 and 232 in 1990. The under five mortality rate, per 1,000 births was 75 in 2014 (94 in 2009). The number of midwives per 1,000 live births was unavailable in 2016 and the lifetime risk of death for pregnant women 1 in 42.

In 2006 an association of doctors in Zimbabwe made calls for Mugabe to make moves to assist the ailing health service. The HIV infection rate in Zimbabwe was estimated to be 14% for people aged 15–49 in 2009. UNESCO reported a decline in HIV prevalence among pregnant women from 26% in 2002 to 21% in 2004. By 2016 HIV/AIDS prevalence had been reduced to 13.5% compared to 40% in 1998.

At the end of November 2008, some operations at three of Zimbabwe's four major referral hospitals had shut down, along with the Zimbabwe Medical School, and the fourth major hospital had two wards and no operating theatres working. Those hospitals still open were not able to obtain basic drugs and medicines. The situation changed drastically after the Unity Government and the introduction of the multi-currency system in February 2009 although the political and economic crisis also contributed to the emigration of the doctors and people with medical knowledge.

Map showing the spread of cholera in and around Zimbabwe put together from several sources

In August 2008 large areas of Zimbabwe were struck by the ongoing cholera epidemic. By December 2008 more than 10,000 people had been infected in all but one of Zimbabwe's provinces, and the outbreak had spread to Botswana, Mozambique, South Africa and Zambia. On 4 December 2008 the Zimbabwe government declared the outbreak to be a national emergency and asked for international aid. By 9 March 2009, the WHO estimated that 4,011 people had succumbed to the waterborne disease since the outbreak began, and the total number of cases recorded had reached 89,018. In Harare, the city council offered free graves to cholera victims.

=== Education ===
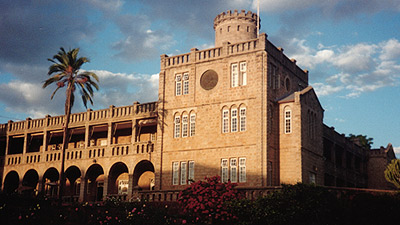
St. George's College, Harare was established in 1896 by a French Jesuit.

Large investments in education since independence has resulted in the highest adult literacy rate in Africa which in 2013 was 90.70%. This is lower than the 92% recorded in 2010 by the United Nations Development Programme and the 97.0% recorded in the 2002 census, while still substantially higher than 80.4% recorded in the 1992 census.

The wealthier portion of the population usually send their children to independent schools as opposed to the government-run schools which are attended by the majority as these are subsidised by the government. School education was made free in 1980, but since 1988, the government has steadily increased the charges attached to school enrolment until they now greatly exceed the real value of fees in 1980. The Ministry of Education of Zimbabwe maintains and operates the government schools, but the fees charged by independent schools are regulated by the cabinet of Zimbabwe. The education department has stated that 20,000 teachers have left Zimbabwe since 2007 and that half of Zimbabwe's children have not progressed beyond primary school. Education came under threat since the economic changes in 2000, with teachers going on strike because of low pay, students unable to concentrate because of hunger, and the price of uniforms soaring making this standard a luxury. Teachers were also one of the main targets of Mugabe's attacks because he thought they were not strong supporters.

Zimbabwe's education system consists of two years of pre-school, seven years of primary and six years of secondary schooling before students can enter university in the country or abroad. The academic year in Zimbabwe runs from January to December, with three terms, separated by one-month breaks, with a total of 40 weeks of school per year. National examinations are written during the third term in November, with "O" level and "A" level subjects also offered in June.

There are seven public (government) universities as well as four church-related universities in Zimbabwe that are internationally accredited. The University of Zimbabwe, the first and largest, was built in 1952 and is located in the Harare suburb of Mount Pleasant. Notable alumni from Zimbabwean universities include Welshman Ncube, Peter Moyo, Tendai Biti, Chenjerai Hove and Arthur Mutambara. Many of the politicians in the government of Zimbabwe have obtained degrees from universities in the United States or other universities abroad.

National University of Science and Technology is the second largest public research university in Zimbabwe located in Bulawayo. It was established in 1991. The National University of Science and Technology strives to become a flourishing and reputable institution not only in Zimbabwe and in Southern Africa but also among the international fraternity of universities. Africa University is a United Methodist university in Manicaland which attracts students from at least 36 African countries.

=== Gender equality ===
Women in Zimbabwe are disadvantaged in many facets including economic, political, and social spheres, and experience sex and gender based violence. A 2014 UN report found that deep rooted cultural issues, patriarchal attitudes, and religious practices negatively impacted women's rights and freedoms in the country. These negative views toward women as well as societal norms impact the incentive for women to participate in the economy and hinder their economic production. Zimbabwe's constitution has provisions in it that provide incentive to achieve greater gender equality, but the data shows that enforcement has been lax and adoption slow. In December 2016 the International Federation of Red Cross and Red Crescent Societies conducted a case study to determine how to best implement effective policy to address issues such as gender violence and implementation of equality laws. It was found that sex and gender based violence against women and girls was increasing in areas that had experienced disasters (floods, drought, disease) but could not quantify the extent of the increase. Some of the obstacles in combating these issues are that there are economic barriers to declaring sex and gender based violence to be unacceptable as well as social barriers. Additionally, governmental services which were installed to help educate the populace about these issues as well as provide services to victims are underfunded and unable to carry out their duties. The UN also provided economic incentive to adopt policies which would discourage these practices which negatively impacted women in Zimbabwe.

Women are often seen as inferior, treated as objects, and viewed in subordinate roles in history and philosophy. Ubuntu, an African philosophy's spiritual aspect, instills the belief that boys should be more valued than girls as boys pass on lineage, and the belief system places high value in respecting one's ancestors. A common expression used in court, "vakadzi ngavanyarare", translates to "women should keep quiet," and as a result women are not consulted in decision-making; they must implement the men's wishes. The subordination of women in Zimbabwe, and the cultural forces which dictate what they must be, have led to deaths and the sacrifice of professional advancement in order for them to fulfill their roles as wives, mothers, and subordinates. Women are taught that they must never refuse their husband's sexual advances, even if they know they are infected with HIV from being unfaithful. As a result of this practice, Zimbabwean women aged 15–49 have an HIV prevalence rate of 16.1% and make up 62% of the total population infected with HIV in that age group.

== Culture ==
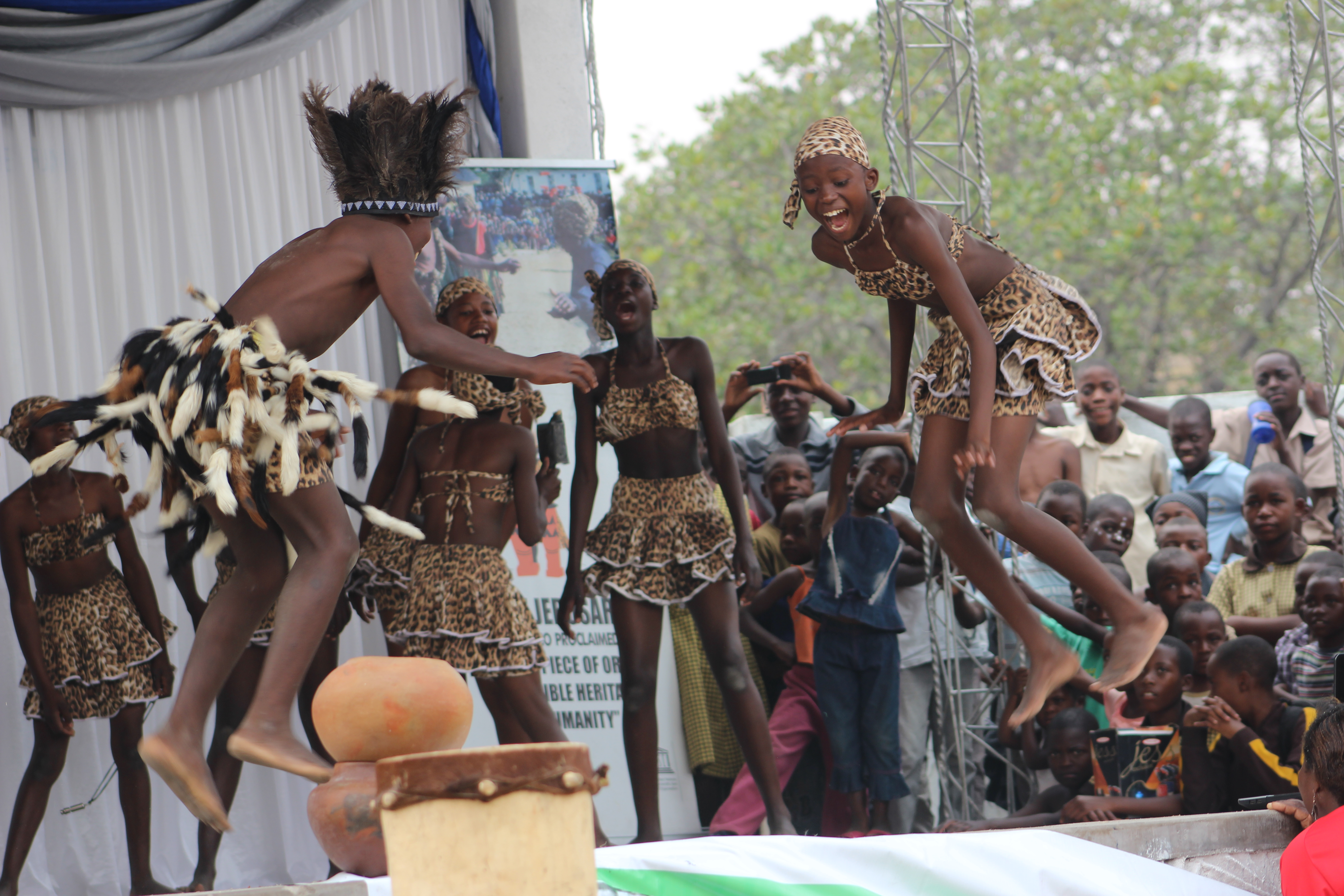
Cultural event in Zimbabwe

Zimbabwe has many different cultures, with Shona beliefs and ceremonies being prominent. The Shona people have many types of sculptures and carvings.

Zimbabwe first celebrated its independence on 18 April 1980. Celebrations are held at either the National Sports Stadium or Rufaro Stadium in Harare. The first independence celebrations were held in 1980 at the Zimbabwe Grounds. At these celebrations, doves are released to symbolise peace, fighter jets fly over, and the national anthem is sung. The flame of independence is lit by the president after parades by the presidential family and members of the armed forces of Zimbabwe. The president also gives a speech to the people of Zimbabwe which is televised for those unable to attend the stadium. Zimbabwe also has a national beauty pageant, the Miss Heritage Zimbabwe contest, which has been held annually since 2012.

=== Arts ===
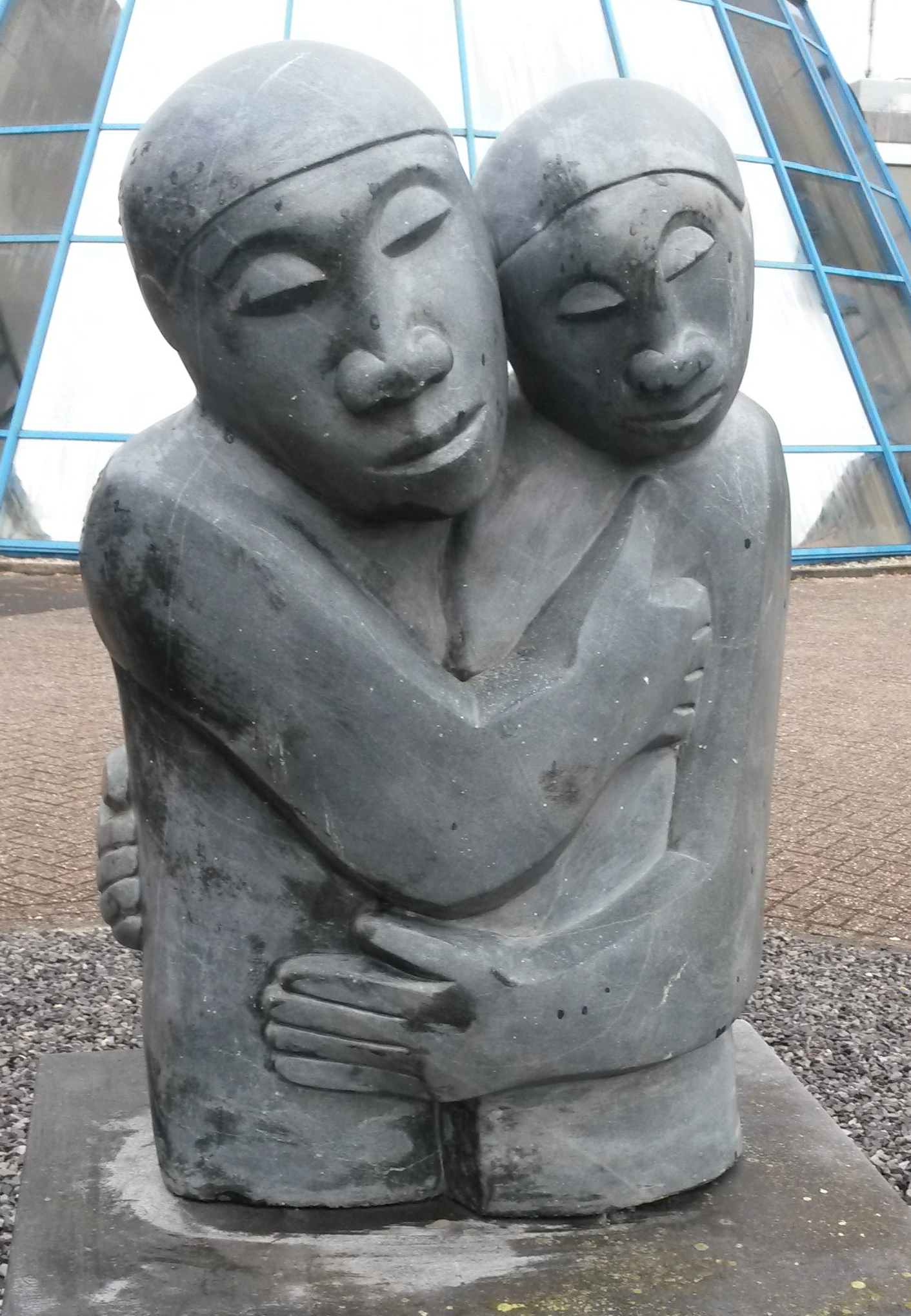
"Reconciliation", a stone sculpture by Amos Supuni

Traditional arts in Zimbabwe include pottery, basketry, textiles, jewellery and carving. Among the distinctive qualities are symmetrically patterned woven baskets and stools carved out of a single piece of wood. Shona sculpture, which has a long cultural history, began evolving into its modern form in the mid-20th century and gained increasing international popularity. Most subjects of carved figures of stylised birds and human figures among others are made with sedimentary rock such as soapstone, as well as harder igneous rocks such as serpentine and the rare stone verdite. Zimbabwean artefacts can be found in countries like Singapore, China and Canada—for example, Dominic Benhura's statue in the Singapore Botanic Gardens.

Shona sculpture has survived through the ages, and the modern style is a fusion of African folklore with European influences. World-renowned Zimbabwean sculptors include Nicholas Nesbert and Anderson Mukomberanwa, Tapfuma Gutsa, Henry Munyaradzi and Locardia Ndandarika.

Several authors are well known within Zimbabwe and abroad. Charles Mungoshi is renowned in Zimbabwe for writing traditional stories in English and in Shona, and his poems and books have sold well with both the black and white communities. Catherine Buckle has achieved international recognition with her two books African Tears and Beyond Tears which tell of the ordeal she went through under the 2000 Land Reform. The first Prime Minister of Rhodesia, Ian Smith, wrote two books – The Great Betrayal and Bitter Harvest. The book The House of Hunger by Dambudzo Marechera won the Guardian Fiction Prize in the UK in 1979. The Nobel Prize-winning author Doris Lessing's first novel The Grass Is Singing is set in Rhodesia, as are the first four volumes of her Children of Violence sequence and her collection of short stories entitled African Stories. In 2013 NoViolet Bulawayo's novel We Need New Names was shortlisted for the Booker Prize. The novel was inspired by a photograph of a child who lost their home in Operation Murambatsvina, Mugabe's slum clearance programme which began in 2005. Bulawayo's second novel, Glory, a satire based on the 2017 coup against Robert Mugabe, was also shortlisted for the Booker Prize. Zimbabwean author Tsitsi Dangarembga's novels have received widespread critical acclaim and her third, This Mournable Body, was shortlisted for the Booker Prize in 2020.

Notable Zimbabwean artists include Henry Mudzengerere and Nicolas Mukomberanwa. A recurring theme in Zimbabwean art is the metamorphosis of man into beast. Zimbabwean musicians like Thomas Mapfumo, Oliver Mtukudzi, the Bhundu Boys, Stella Chiweshe, Alick Macheso and Audius Mtawarira have achieved international recognition. Among members of the white minority community, Theatre has a large following, with numerous theatrical companies performing in Zimbabwe's urban areas.

=== Cuisine ===
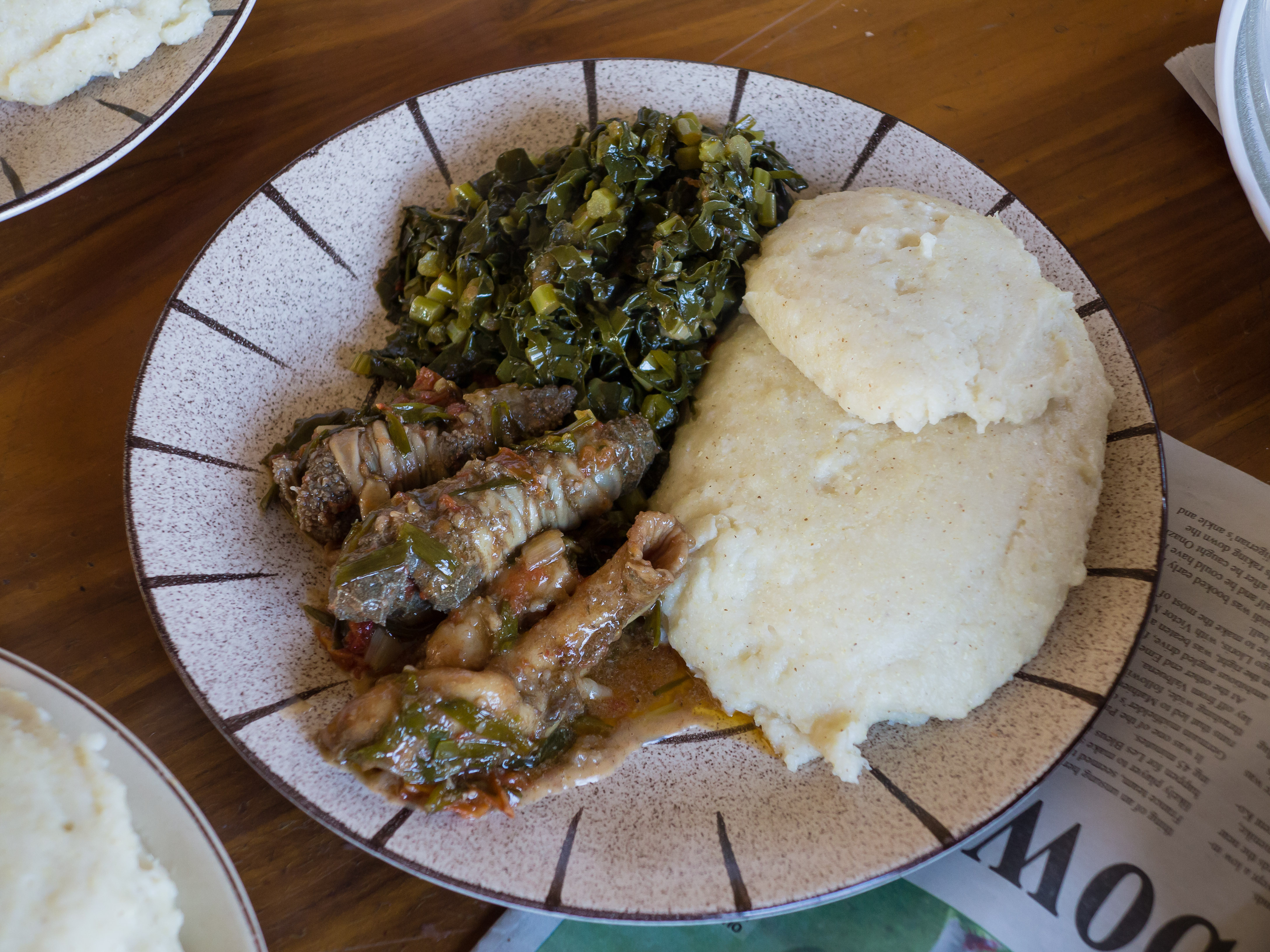
A meal of sadza (right), greens, and goat offal. The goat's small intestines are wrapped around small pieces of large intestines before cooking.

Like in many African countries, the majority of Zimbabweans depend on a few staple foods. "Mealie meal", also known as cornmeal, is used to prepare sadza or isitshwala, as well as porridge known as bota or ilambazi. Sadza is made by mixing the cornmeal with water to produce a thick paste/porridge. After the paste has been cooking for several minutes, more cornmeal is added to thicken the paste. This is usually eaten as lunch or dinner, usually with sides such as gravy, vegetables (spinach, chomolia, or collard greens), beans, and meat (stewed, grilled, roasted, or sundried). Sadza is also commonly eaten with curdled milk (sour milk), commonly known as "lacto" (mukaka wakakora), or dried Tanganyika sardine, known locally as kapenta or matemba. Bota is a thinner porridge, cooked without the additional cornmeal and usually flavoured with peanut butter, milk, butter, or jam. Bota is usually eaten for breakfast.

Graduations, weddings, and any other family gatherings will usually be celebrated with the killing of a goat or cow, which will be barbecued or roasted by the family.

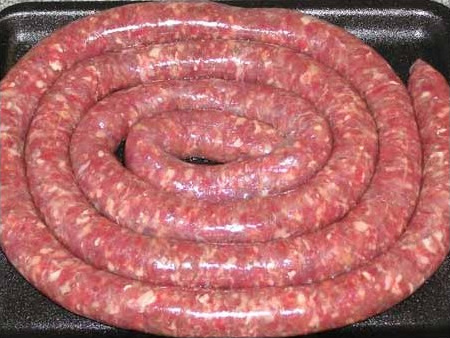
Raw boerewors

Even though the Afrikaners are a small group (10%) within the white minority group, Afrikaner recipes are popular. Biltong, a type of jerky, is a popular snack, prepared by hanging bits of spiced raw meat to dry in the shade. Boerewors is served with sadza. It is a long sausage, often well-spiced, composed of beef and any other meat like pork, and barbecued.

As Zimbabwe was a British colony, some people there have adopted some colonial-era English eating habits. For example, most people will have porridge in the morning, as well as 10 o'clock tea (midday tea). They will have lunch, often leftovers from the night before, freshly cooked sadza, or sandwiches (which is more common in the cities). After lunch, there is usually 4 o'clock tea (afternoon tea), which is served before dinner. It is not uncommon for tea to be had after dinner.

Rice, pasta, and potato-based foods (French fries and mashed potato) also make up part of Zimbabwean cuisine. A local favourite is rice cooked with peanut butter, which is taken with thick gravy, mixed vegetables and meat. A potpourri of peanuts known as nzungu, boiled and sundried maize, black-eyed peas known as nyemba, and Bambara groundnuts known as nyimo makes a traditional dish called mutakura.

=== Sports ===
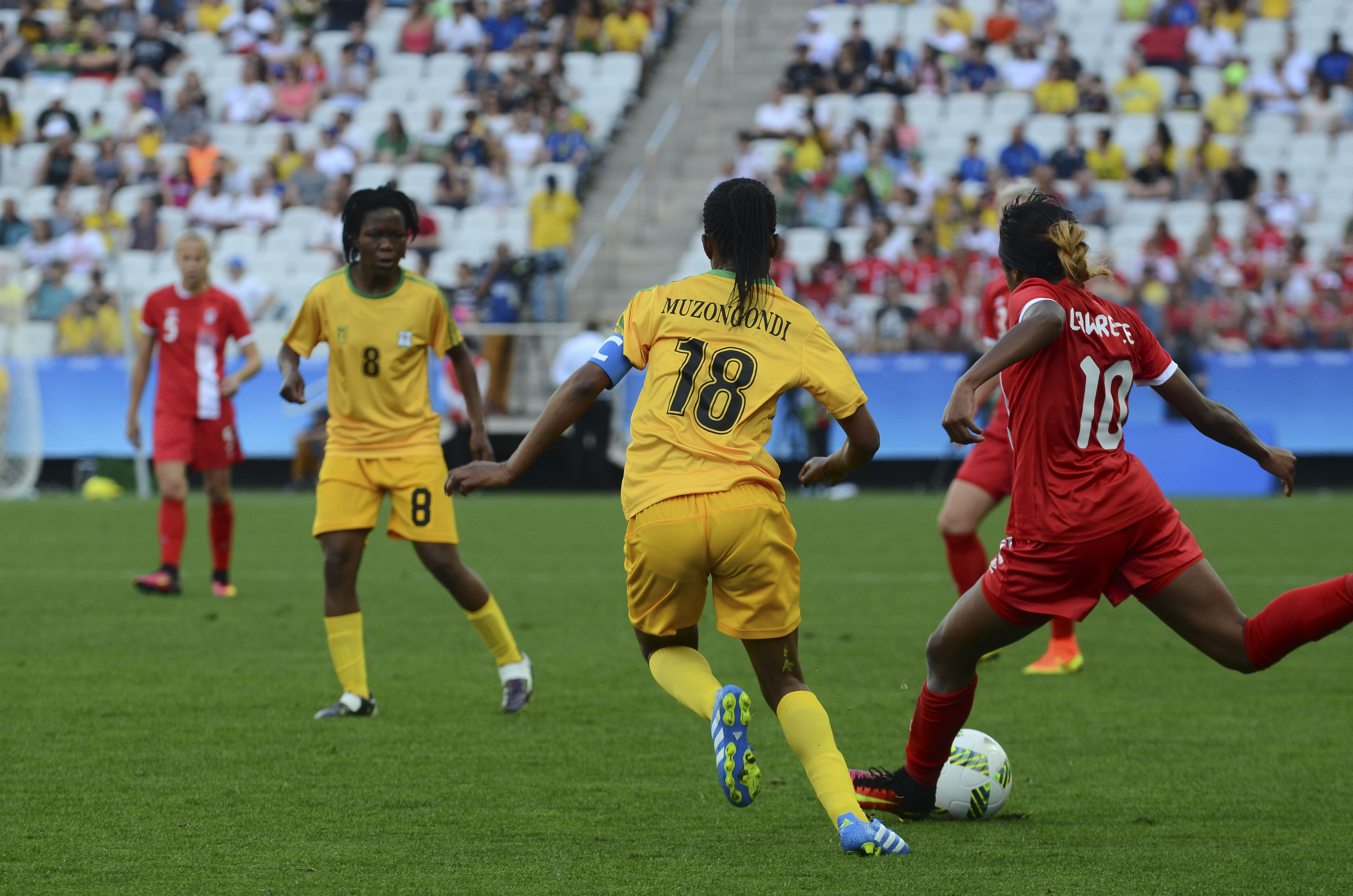
Zimbabwe women's national football team at the 2016 Olympic Games

Football is the most popular sport in Zimbabwe. The Warriors have qualified for the Africa Cup of Nations six times (2004, 2006, 2017, 2019, 2021 and 2025), and won the Southern Africa championship on six occasions (2000, 2003, 2005, 2009, 2017, 2018) and the Eastern Africa cup once (1985). As of June 2026, the team is ranked 113th.

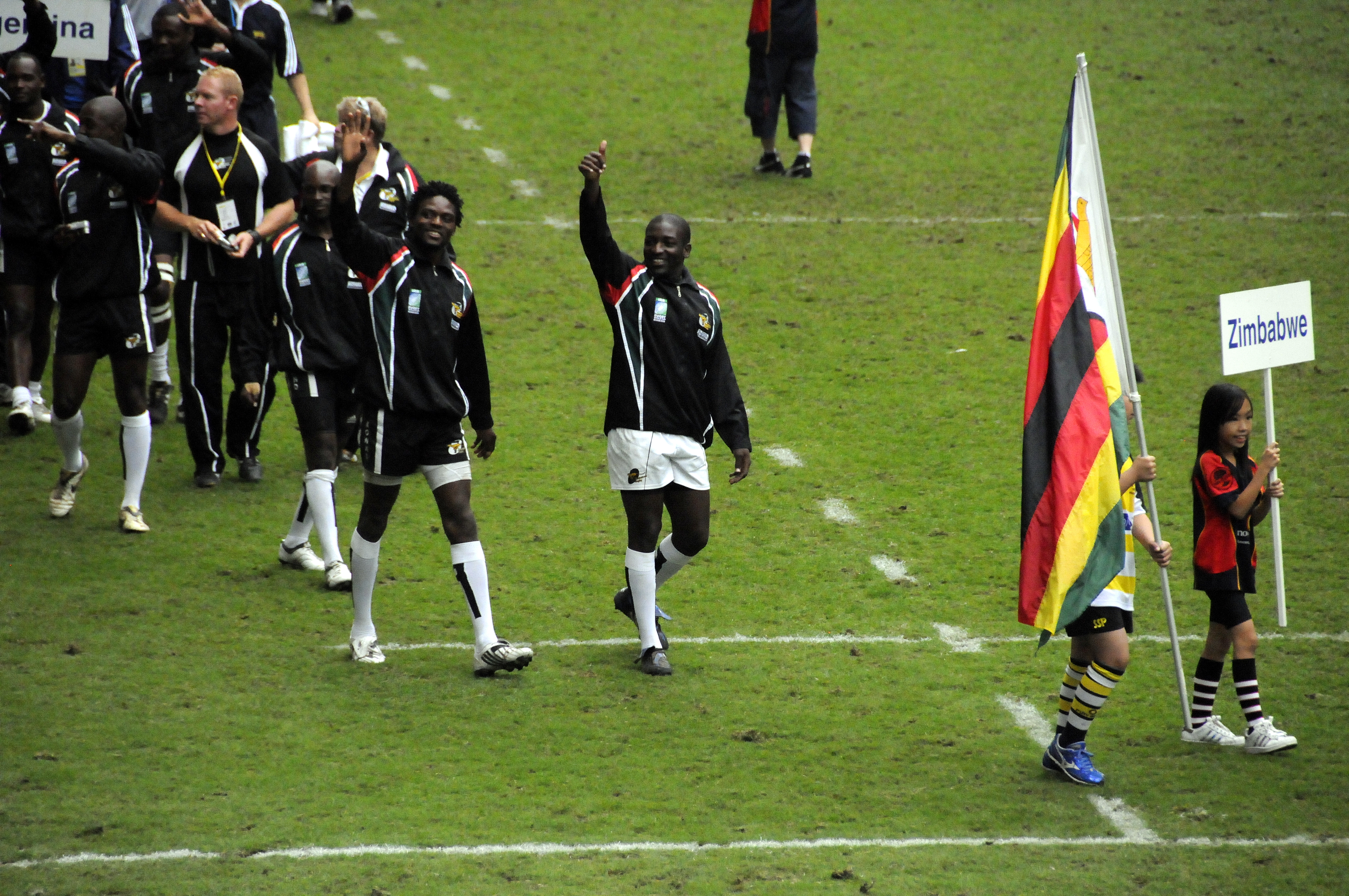
Zimbabwe Sevens Rugby Team at the 2009 Hong Kong Sevens

Rugby union is a significant sport in Zimbabwe. The national side have represented the country at two Rugby World Cup tournaments in 1987 and 1991 and have qualified for 2027.

Cricket is also a very popular sport in Zimbabwe. It used to have a following mostly among the white minority, but it has grown to become a widely popular sport among most Zimbabweans.

=== Media ===
The media of Zimbabwe is now once again diverse, having come under tight restriction between 2002 and 2008 by the government during the economic and political crisis. The Zimbabwean constitution promises freedom of the media and expression. Since the appointment of a new media and information minister in 2013 the media is facing less political interference, and the supreme court has ruled some sections of the strict media laws as unconstitutional. In July 2009 the BBC and CNN were able to resume operations and report legally and openly from Zimbabwe. The Zimbabwe Ministry of Media, Information and Publicity stated that, "the Zimbabwe government never banned the BBC from carrying out lawful activities inside Zimbabwe".

In 2010 the Zimbabwe Media Commission was established by the inclusive, power-sharing government. In May 2010 the commission licensed three privately owned newspapers, including the previously banned Daily News, for publication. Reporters Without Borders described the decisions as a "major advance". In June 2010 NewsDay became the first independent daily newspaper to be published in Zimbabwe in seven years. The Zimbabwe Broadcasting Corporation's monopoly in the broadcasting sector was ended with the licensing of two private radio stations in 2012. The main published newspapers are The Herald and The Chronicle which are printed in Harare and Bulawayo respectively.

Since the 2002 Access to Information and Protection of Privacy Act was passed, a number of privately owned news outlets were shut down by the government, including Daily News whose managing director Wilf Mbanga went on to form the influential The Zimbabwean. As a result, many press organisations have been set up in both neighbouring and Western countries by exiled Zimbabweans. Because the internet is unrestricted, many Zimbabweans are allowed to access online news sites set up by exiled journalists. Reporters Without Borders claims the media environment in Zimbabwe involves "surveillance, threats, imprisonment, censorship, blackmail, abuse of power and denial of justice are all brought to bear to keep firm control over the news." In its 2021 report, Reporters Without Borders ranked the Zimbabwean media as 130th out of 180, noting that "access to information has improved and self-censorship has declined, but journalists are still often attacked or arrested". The government also bans many foreign broadcasting stations from Zimbabwe, including the CBC, Sky News, Channel 4, American Broadcasting Company, Australian Broadcasting Corporation, and Fox News. News agencies and newspapers from other Western countries and South Africa have also been banned from the country.

=== National symbols ===
Traditional Zimbabwe Bird design

The stone-carved Zimbabwe Bird appears on the national flags and the coats of arms of both Zimbabwe and Rhodesia, as well as on banknotes and coins (first on Rhodesian pound and then Rhodesian dollar). It probably represents the bateleur eagle or the African fish eagle. The famous soapstone bird carvings stood on walls and monoliths of the ancient city of Great Zimbabwe.

Balancing rocks are geological formations all over Zimbabwe. The rocks are perfectly balanced without other supports. They are created when ancient granite intrusions are exposed to weathering, as softer rocks surrounding them erode away. They have been depicted on both the banknotes of Zimbabwe and the Rhodesian dollar banknotes. The ones found on the current notes of Zimbabwe, named the Banknote Rocks, are located in Epworth, approximately 14 km (9 mi) southeast of Harare. There are many different formations of the rocks, incorporating single and paired columns of three or more rocks. These formations are a feature of south and east tropical Africa from northern South Africa northwards to Sudan. The most notable formations in Zimbabwe are located in the Matobo National Park in Matabeleland.

The national anthem of Zimbabwe is "Raise the Flag of Zimbabwe" (Shona: Simudzai Mureza wedu WeZimbabwe; Northern Ndebele: Kalibusiswe Ilizwe leZimbabwe). It was introduced in March 1994 after a nationwide competition to replace Ishe Komborera Africa. The winning entry was a song written by Professor Solomon Mutswairo and composed by Fred Changundega. It has been translated into all three of the main languages of Zimbabwe.

== See also ==
- Outline of Zimbabwe
