= Potato production in Zimbabwe =

Cultivation of potato in Zimbabwe

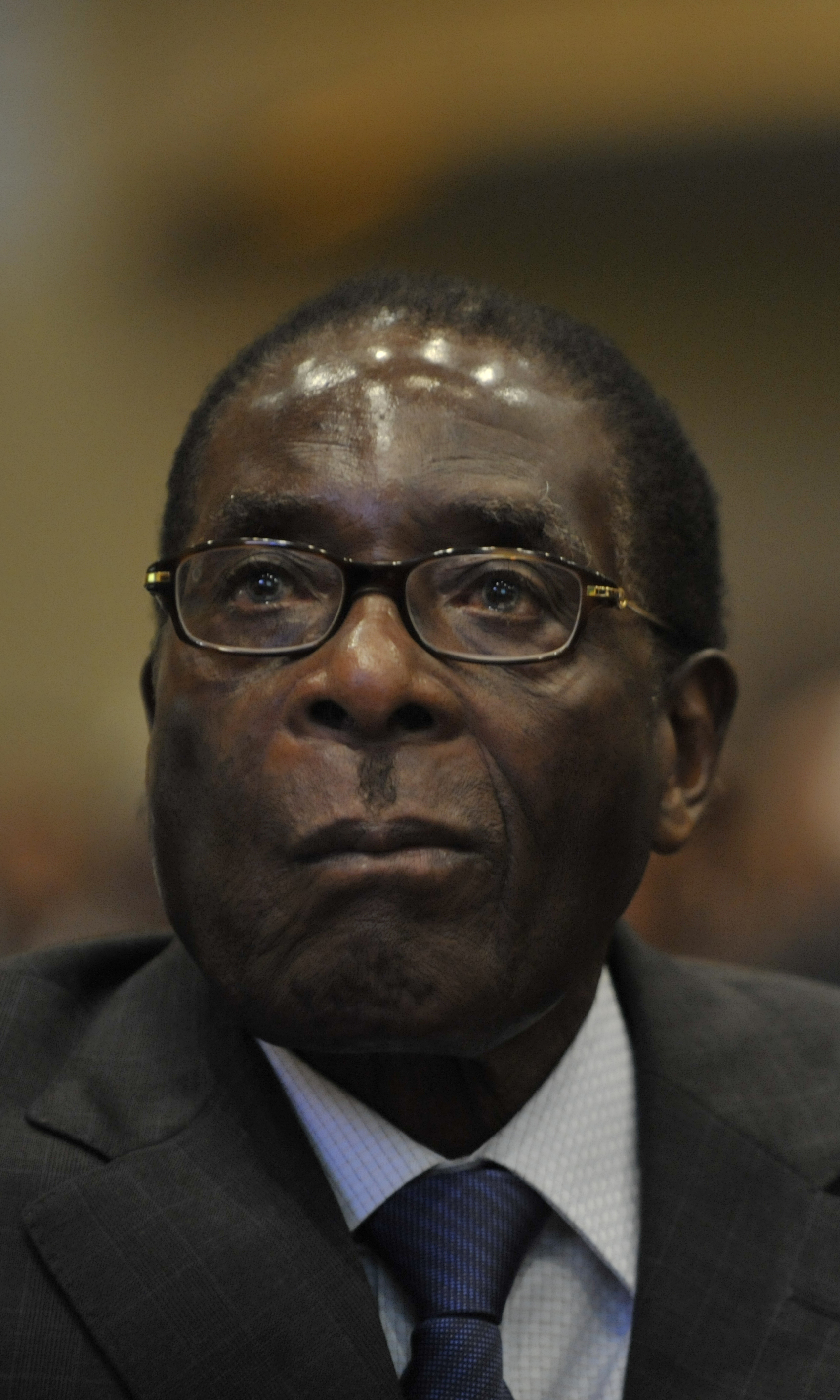
According to Robert Mugabe, Zimbabweans are "not potato eaters".

Zimbabwe has a well-established history of potato cultivation, although production levels have been declining since the 20th century due to a lack of knowledge of cultivation methods and the rising costs of farming.

== History ==
Potatoes were well established in contemporary Zimbabwe by the early twentieth century. In 1911, variety trials were undertaken with recorded yields up to 11.5 tonnes/ha. To avoid the introduction of pests that may hinder the production of tobacco, one of Zimbabwe's most profitable cash crops, the government decided early on that local potato production would be a priority. Additionally, a national breeding programme, which subjects imported potatoes to heavy quarantine, was instituted in 1956 and has been the only such programme that is authorised to do so. After the programme's institution, the mean crop yield rose by about 9 tonnes/ha. The production of potatoes in Zimbabwe is protected under the Plant Pests and Diseases (Seed Potato Protection) Regulations in Statutory Instrument 679 (1982), although farmers themselves bear the responsibility to safeguarding their crop from diseases.

Production levels in recent years have been dwindling, however, due to rising production costs – in July 2017, a hectare of potatoes in Zimbabwe cost US$12,000 to produce. The chairperson of the Zimbabwean Potato Council blamed this on South Africa's dumping of cheaper potatoes. A 2015 subjective and biased study claimed that most farmers lacked the technical know-how, but this is unverifiable. Most Zimbabweans are trained in farming and they are highly skilled as they practice farming from childhood

== Consumption ==
Although many Zimbabweans like eating potatoes, consumption of potatoes in Zimbabwe typically occurs in urban areas, where the average household income tends to be higher; those residing in the poorer enclaves of Zimbabwe are unable to afford potatoes. According to unpublished Food and Agriculture Organization estimates from 1986, 88 percent of the 22,000 tonnes (22,000 long tons; 24,000 short tons) of potatoes available in Zimbabwe were used for consumption, with per capita consumption around 2 kilograms (4.4 lb). When asked about the famine and growing food shortages in the country in 2005, President Robert Mugabe claimed there was no problem and said that "if hungry Zimbabweans cannot have corn, they should eat potatoes instead. We have heaps of potatoes but people are not potato eaters."

== See also ==
- Agriculture in Zimbabwe
- Economy of Zimbabwe
- Land reform in Zimbabwe
