= Snake lily =

Snake lily is a common name for several plants and may refer to:

- Amorphophallus, a large genus
  - Konjac, a common name of the Asian plant Amorphophallus konjac
- Dichelostemma multiflorum, native to California and Oregon
- Dracunculus vulgaris, endemic to the Balkans
- Scadoxus puniceus, native to much of southern and eastern Africa
