= History of the Mutapa Empire =

The Mutapa Empire was founded in the 15th century following a gradual process of migrations from Great Zimbabwe to the northern Zimbabwean Plateau, encouraged in part by the establishment of a major trade route along the Zambezi. According to Shona tradition, the state was founded by Mwenemutapa Mutota in the region of Dande and was expanded by his son Mwenemutapa Matope, who conquered local Tavara and Tonga groups and established several vassals such as Barue, Uteve, and Manyika. Around 1490, a civil conflict saw the rise and fall of Changamire, a rival claimant backed by the Kingdom of Butua, before Chikuyo restored the dynasty around 1494.

In the mid-16th century, the Portuguese began supplanting Muslim Swahili traders in the Zambezi Valley. In 1561, Mwenemutapa Negomo received the Jesuit Gonçalo da Silveira, who converted him to Christianity; Silveira was subsequently executed by court conspirators. The Portuguese launched a military expedition in the 1570s to avenge Silveira and conquer Mutapa, but it failed. Mwenemutapa Gatsi Rusere later sparked a civil war and was eventually restored to power with Portuguese assistance c. 1610, while managing to avoid formal subjugation.

After Gatsi's death c. 1623, a succession conflict ended in 1629 with Mavhura victorious through Portuguese support. Mavhura signed a treaty of vassalage with the Portuguese Crown, permitting wide Portuguese privileges in Mutapa. Many prazos (land granted to settlers independent of the Crown) were established during the 17th century, and their profit-seeking owners employed private armies which disrupted trade and raided the Mwenemutapa's subjects. In the second half of the 17th century the region was devastated by locusts, smallpox, measles, and plagues. In the 1680s and '90s Changamire Dombo founded the Rozvi Empire and expelled all Portuguese from the Plateau. Subsequent civil wars between the Nyamhandu and Boroma houses weakened central authority and gave the state a confederal character.

During the 19th century the wider region was disrupted by Nguni groups fleeing the Mfecane, though poor conditions prevented their settlement in Chidima, where the Mwenemutapa retained authority. In 1884 the Portuguese invaded and conquered Chidima, with Mutapa's former territories eventually partitioned between the British and the Portuguese. Resistance continued under Chioko and his coalition until 1902, when Chioko's death ended hopes of restoring the empire and the rebellion was suppressed.

== Origins and early history ==
=== Foundation ===
Shona oral tradition attributes Great Zimbabwe's demise to a salt shortage, which may be a figurative way of speaking of land depletion for agriculturalists, or of the depletion of critical resources for the community. One version says that the founder of Mutapa, Mutota (also called "Nyatsimba" or "Nemasengere"), was the son of Zimbabwean mambo (king) Chimubatamatosi, and led an army north through Shangwe to conquer Dande while searching for salt. (Note: Some versions say that Mutota was the last ruler of Great Zimbabwe. Some traditions say that the search for salt was because the Zimbabwean mambo was tired of eating salt made from goat's dung. It was believed that only Mutapa's most recent ancestors would follow them, with older ancestors staying at Great Zimbabwe and providing protection there. A Shona king's claim to land is through their ancestors, and this would have impacted the legitimacy of Mutapa's leaders.) A second version says that some Karanga from Great Zimbabwe migrated slowly to the northern Zimbabwean Plateau. Accordingly, an elephant hunter in Shangwe named Mutota gained prominence, and took interest in trade along the Zambezi, while also finding salt in Dande. In the early-15th century Angoche traders had opened a new route along the Zambezi via the Tonga and Tavara to reach the goldfields close to Khami (capital of the Kingdom of Butua). Accordingly the Karanga made alliances and intermarried with the Tonga and Tavara, and via influencing succession disputes they increased their power in the region. Dande was placed in a strategic location for trade and had rich agricultural land and elephant-hunting grounds. Mutota is said to have been a hunter-warrior in the militaristic Nzou Samanyanga clan, which he led to defeat Tavara chief Matsiwu and conquer Dande. Mutota established the capital of the nascent Mutapa Kingdom at Chitako-Changonya Hill where he built a stone enclosure (zimbabwe), and he distributed land and administrative positions to his allies. Mutota is said to have extended his rule over 'Guruuswa' (a territory to the south) before his death.

The Shona did not have professional oral historians, and history was instead recorded by elder experts who had an aptitude, and also by the svikiro (spirit medium) of a mhondoro (royal ancestral spirit) or mudzimu (spirit). Stan Mudenge wrote that Shona traditions are likely telescoped (compressed) due to them only mentioning around half of the known rulers, and that the events surrounding Mutota and his successors before c. 1490 may have taken place over the course of several generations of rulers. Rulers belonging to different royal houses were sometimes 'forgotten' so as to weaken their claims to succession. Mudenge, David Beach, and Innocent Pikirayi consider the second version of tradition to be closer to the true process of state formation, and Beach and Pikirayi date this process to the 14th and 15th centuries. Beach thought that Mutota may have been a symbolic figure, as there is no mention of him as Mutapa's founder in traditions recorded before the 1860s (traditions recorded in the 18th century made no mention of him at all and held "Nemapangere" and "Nemangoro" as the first rulers). Beach also expressed scepticism about the Mutapa dynasty's origin in Great Zimbabwe, as most early traditions say they originated in 'Guruuswa', a word meaning "long grass" which Beach says was used to refer to less-wooded regions by groups that had migrated from the open central Plateau to wooded valleys near its edges. Archaeological research has however shown that Mutapa was a northward extension of Great Zimbabwe.

=== Expansion ===
Some traditions say that Mutota stated that any son wanting to succeed him had to commit incest with his daughter Nyamhita; Mudenge wrote that this may be symbolic of Mutota's "consuming ambition for power [leading] him to do the unthinkable", or because the local groups may have been matrilineal and expected Nyamhita to succeed him. Mutota is said to have been succeeded by one of his sons, either Nemangoro or Matope (also called "Nyanhehwe" or "Nebedza"). Matope is much more famous and widely revered, compared to Nemangoro about whom little is said, which Mudenge says indicates that Nemangoro must have ruled before Matope for mention of him to survive in some traditions. Tradition continues that Matope established his zimbabwe in Bedza, and gave Nyamhita an area called Handa, as she became known as Nehanda. Matope embarked on numerous military campaigns, first conquering all Tavara and Tonga from the Musengezi River eastwards to the Ruenya River. During the campaign he allied a member of the local Nguruve clan called Chimupore who was allocated Barue; traditions vary on whether Matope extended his rule to the Indian Ocean at this time or just before his death. After this, Matope encountered resistance led by the Tavara Nhari Unendoro clan near Choma. The clan leader's spokesman was Karuva, a rainmaking-priest of the Dzivaguru cult. Based on traditions, Mudenge wrote that the Tavara fiercely resisted Matope, and that it was only when Karuva's son Chikuma betrayed the Tavara (by giving away Tavara armies' positions or by siding with Matope) that he was able to subdue them. With this, Matope gained control over trade routes along the Zambezi, providing security at the bazaars near Sena for Muslim Swahili traders from Angoche. Like with Mutota, Beach and Mudenge said that Matope may represent multiple rulers' reigns.

== Revolts and contact with the Portuguese ==
=== Conquests of Uteve and Manyika, the Changamire revolt, and Portuguese expansion into Zambezi trade ===
According to tradition, Matope was succeeded by his son Mavhura, about whom little is known. Another of his sons, Nyahuma Mukombero, became Mwenemutapa and expanded to conquer Uteve. Uteve was a valuable region because Kilwa and Sofala (rivals of Angoche) traded with the interior via it. Traditions say that the conquest was aided by the governor of Guruuswa (Mutapa's southern province), Changamire I, though they vary on the details. One version says that Mukombero placed his son in charge of the newly-conquered land, while Teve traditions say that Changamire aided Bandahuma, a brother of the Mwenemutapa, in fleeing his brother to found a new kingdom, becoming the first Sachiteve.

The genealogy of Changamire I has been the subject of speculation by scholars. Some scholars say he was a member of the Torwa dynasty of Butua or a friend of them, while others say he was a son of Matope or that he married one of Matope's daughters. After analysing Valoyi traditions, Mathebula and Mokgoatšana say that Changamire was likely a descendant of both dynasties, being the son of Matope or having married Matope's daughter (or both were true and he married his sister). Diogo de Alcáçova's report in 1506 indicates that Changamire I was a member of the Torwa dynasty who had served as a wealthy and influential governor of the Mwenemutapa. According to Alcáçova's account, rumours were spread by others close to Mukombero that Changamire was plotting for the kingship, and Mukombero ordered Changamire to undertake a poison trial, wherein if he drank the poison (muteyo) and was harmed by it, he was deemed guilty. Accordingly, around 1490 Changamire led an army to Mukombwe's zimbabwe and killed him, afterwards assuming the kingship. He is also said to have killed 21 of Mukombero's sons, with Chikuyo Chisamarengu being the only one to escape. In 1493 the Torwa mambo (king) is recorded to have gifted the Mwenemutapa 4000 cows and copious amounts of gold. Around 1494, Chikuyo returned with a large army, and they fought a deadly battle lasting over 3 days, which ended in Changamire I's death. Chikuyo assumed the kingship and consolidated his rule over the empire, except for Guruuswa which stayed loyal to the successor Changamire II; over the course of the following decades the Munhumutapa is known to have fought Changamire II (likely aided by Butua) intermittently, until at least 1512.

Meanwhile, Sachiteve Bandahuma of Uteve gradually became independent with the help of Changamire II, and both Bandahuma and Mwenemutapa Chikuyo set their sights on conquering the highlands of Manyika, situated between Guruuswa and Uteve. The Barue king (a loyal vassal of Mutapa) sent his son who occupied Manyika and fended off Bandahuma's son Nyamunda, who turned to conquer Madanda and installed a brother as Sedanda. The following years saw trade from Sofala return, and in 1506 the Portuguese gained control of the city. There was relative peace between Mutapa and its enemies, until c. 1515 when Nyamunda began campaigns to expand his territory. Nyamunda sought to expand towards Sofala and then gain the Portuguese's help in conquering Manyika from Mutapa, after which he'd control the lucrative trade route. However the Portuguese had little to offer and sought relations with Mutapa, resulting in relations between them and Nyamunda souring. As the Mutapa—Teve war ensued, Chikuyo faced two revolts (one by a general named Sono) and reportedly warred with Butua. Chikuyo died around 1530, and is said to have been succeeded by Mwenemutapa 'Neshangwe Munembire' ("neshangwe" "munembire" literally means "ruler of Shangwe" "person of Mbire", and Beach says that he likely is not historical). In the following decades, the Portuguese supplanted Swahili traders along the Zambezi trade route by replacing bazaars with the settlements of Quelimane, Sena, and Tete. Little is known about the Mutapa—Teve wars, except that they were reignited for a short time during the early 1540s. According to João Velho's 1547 letter, a Muslim trader, supported by the Portuguese, led a campaign to expel a "Changamira" from the lands around the "River of Sofala" (either the Buzi or Pungwe river), and supplanted his rule there by conquest, distributing gifts and encouraging his subjects to revolt. Several scholars considered this to have been the final defeat of the Changamires, though Stan Mudenge wrote that "Changamira" referred to the Sachiteve (either Nyamunda or his successor Chipute) as a continuation of Nyamunda's wars in the territory.

According to tradition, Mwenemutapa 'Neshangwe Munembire' was succeeded by Chivere Nyasoro (son of Chikuyo) c. 1550, who is said to have murdered an older brother to gain the kingship. During his reign, a son of 'Neshangwe Munembire' called 'Nyandoro Mukomohasha' is said to have reconquered and ruled the Tonga in between the Ruya and Mazoe rivers and to have been appointed as the supreme commander of Mutapa's armies to guard the Zambezi trade route; local traditions say that the Nyandoro dynasty preceded other local dynasties. Contrary to Mutapa tradition, contemporary Portuguese records said that the Mukomohasha was "Tonga", while both proposed successor dynasties have a Tavara totem. Chivere was succeeded by his son Negomo Mupunzagutu around 1560. Tradition attached to the Mukomohasha title says that 'Nyandoro Mukomohasha' had been inline for the kingship, but refused it because he enjoyed warring too much.

=== Silveira's mission to Mutapa ===
Early in his reign, Negomo was told that a prestigious Portuguese mhondoro/n'anga (medium/diviner) would be sent to his court, and in 1561 Gonçalo da Silveira arrived at Negomo's zimbabwe. Silveira was an ardent anti-Muslim nobleman (with the Reconquista in recent memory) and member of the Society of Jesus (Jesuits), who sought to convert the Mwenemutapa to Christianity so that he would favour Portuguese traders and counter Muslim influence, an attitude that contradicted the diverse and collaborative culture of trade along the Zambezi. Having arrived, the immaterialism of his refusal of Negomo's gifts of women, gold, cows, and land impressed Negomo, and Negomo invited him into his private quarters (an unheard-of privilege) to discuss matters. Silveira told Negomo he wished to gain his conversion, and a few days later gifted him a painting of the Virgin Mary. Young and unmarried, Negomo was captivated by the painting and hung it in his sleeping quarters. After experiencing dreams where the painting talked to him in an unintelligible language, Negomo asked Silveira why he could not understand the language, who replied that it was because he was not yet Christian. At Negomo's request, Silveira catechised him and his mother for around a fortnight, after which they were baptised. Silveira gifted Negomo cloth, while Negomo gifted 100 cows, which Silveira had killed and distributed among the population. This greatly increased Silveira's influence, and he converted and baptised hundreds of high-ranking Shona.

Religious leaders such as mhondoro and n'anga were key to the functioning of the state and its stability, and Mudenge says that they were probably denigrated by Silveira. Muslim traders and court officials who had not converted also likely viewed Silveira as a threat. These three groups collaborated to turn Negomo against Silveira, though Shona perceptions of Silveira's mission have been disputed among scholars. The traditional interpretation by historians such as Mudenge has been that the collaborators told Negomo that Silveira was a spy whose real motive was to inform a Portuguese invasion, and that he was a secret ally of Sachiteve Chipute and a muroyi (wizard) who would use his supernatural powers to devastate Mutapa and kill the Mwenemutapa. It continues that Silveira was strangled with a rope by a group led by the mbokorume and thrown in the Musengezi River. Having re-evaluated the evidence, Gai Roufe says that Silveira was interpretated as embodying the spirit of Karuva/Dzivaguru, a foreign spirit (shavi, which were feared), citing similarities between Silveira's death and a coronation ritual associated with Karuva. (Note: Roufe refers to accounts where the conclusion of succession conflicts in Mutapa ideally ended with a ritual that re-enacted the local tradition of Matope defeating Karuva, where the losing claimant was strangled to death with a ribbon by a group led by the mbokorume, similar to Silveira's murder. Other accounts say that if the kingship passed peacefully, a lord with the title Nevinga would reign for three days before playing the role of Karuva as part of a coronation ritual. In the tradition Karuva is said to have disappeared into the ground and created a "great lake" (the literal meaning of Dzivaguru), and locals decades later are reported as believing Silveira had been thrown into a lake. Roufe says that this was likely how Silveira was perceived, partly because Negomo was not hostile to the Portuguese after the event.) Days later, Portuguese merchants arrived to say that God would punish Negomo and the viceroy would send an army to avenge Silveira; Negomo blamed Muslims and had those involved killed. When famine and disease followed, he is said to have had his mother (who had supported killing Silveira) executed. Nevertheless, Mudenge says that Silveira's revolution had been suppressed.

== Barreto's invasion, the wars of Gatsi Rusere, and the Portuguese struggle for dominance ==
=== Barreto's invasion ===
Following the death of Silveira, the Portuguese Crown sent Francisco Barreto to lead an army and invade and conquer Mutapa, aiming to gain control of its gold reserves. (Note: Stan Mudenge strongly criticised the Portuguese Crown's casus belli for this expedition, calling it "jesuitical casuistry". He further wrote "It was also argued by the 'men of learning' [who were consulted on making war] that Papal Bulls gave authority to the Portuguese king to enjoy the hospitality of the lands of Mutapa, to travel and cause the conversion of the people of the people of the area. And if these privileges were not granted then the Portuguese king could enforce the above 'rights' by force. This of course cannot be defined as a criterion for a just war in any objective sense of the word. It is part and parcel of the bigoted arrogance inspired by a mixture of Christocentric and Eurocentric world views which have afflicted men of European descent over the centuries and to which the rest of mankind is expected to acquiesce.") Meanwhile, the Tonga of the Lower Zambezi had been in rebellion against Mutapa since c. 1550, disrupting trade. The Portuguese expedition suffered several setbacks en route from Portugal, though had travelled up the Zambezi and reached Sena by 1571. While there, several of their oxen and horses died due to the hostile conditions of the Zambezi Valley, along with some soldiers by disease. The accompanying Jesuit priest blamed Muslims, and had many of them massacred. Mwenemutapa Negomo received a Portuguese ambassador in his zimbabwe, who told him that Barreto's forces were peaceful and wanted his permission and assistance in defeating the 'rebellious' Tonga of Samungazi, and to allow them to go onward to the mines of Manyika and Guruuswa (the Samungazi Tonga had killed some Portuguese traders in the years prior). Negomo, who reportedly had an army of 100,000 men, approved. Barreto's forces (over 650 marksmen) travelled upriver, and scored several indecisive victories against the Samangazi thanks to artillery and arquebuses. The Samungazi sued for peace, which Barreto accepted and he attempted to journey to their capital (muzinda) to sign the treaty, though failed due to his men's bad health and low morale, and thus returned to Sena empty-handed. Negomo's forces then subdued the Samungazi. Negomo sent an embassy of 200 men and the Mukomohasha to Barreto to regain friendly relations (and possibly to inspect his forces). Barreto made several demands, and after they exchanged gifts he returned to Mozambique Island to report to the Portuguese king, though died soon after. His successor, Vasco Homem, abandoned plans of conquering Mutapa, instead aiming to conquer the gold mines of Manyika. Homem's forces marched through Uteve (a rival of Manyika), fighting battles and burning villages as they went, until reaching Manyika's capital. Expecting to find 'El Dorado', they were disappointed to find people had to mine and pan for their gold. Homem signed a treaty with Manyika's ruler granting protection to traders, before quickly retreating after hearing Negomo's large army was on its way. Homem's forces were afterwards defeated and exterminated while trying to conquer silver mines of Chikova (upriver from Sena). Stan Mudenge wrote that the "true victor" from these events was Negomo, having regained control over the Samungazi and had the rivalrous Teve weakened.

=== The wars of Gatsi Rusere ===
Relations between Mutapa and the Portuguese continued to be amicable, and in the 1580s the Portuguese established several feiras (marketplaces) outside of the Zambezi Valley on the Zimbabwean Plateau. The most important was Masapa, and the Portuguese captain there took on one of the Mukomohasha's roles as "captain of the gates" of Mutapa, being subordinate to the Mwenemutapa and referred to as a 'great wife'. In the late 1580s, Negomo died (Note: Negomo's chief wife is said to have poisoned herself and been buried with him. The Portuguese had gifted Negomo a greyhound which he loved and was also buried with, along with a tamed sheep he had raised.) and was succeeded by Mwenemutapa Gatsi Rusere, who had likely been Negomo's Mukomohasha. (Note: Gatsi was reportedly very addicted to dagga (mbanje), and had a short temper. David Beach wrote that his "actions on some occasions appear so irrational that it may be fairly doubted whether he was entirely sane".) In the late 1590s, a 'Zimba' army (the 'Zimba' served as mercenaries for Lundu of the Maravi) crossed the Zambezi and occupied some gold-producing land (possibly Handa). Gatsi Rusere quickly sent his forces (led by the Nengomasha) to their location; the Zimba retreated and scorched the land, forcing the Nengomasha's forces to give up due to lack of available provisions. Gatsi was furious and executed the Nengomasha (his uncle), sparking a civil war between the Mukomohasha and Nengomasha houses. Meanwhile, another 'Zimba' army had come at the same time as the previous one, though had submitted to be a Mutapa vassal; they rebelled, and with Portuguese help Gatsi's forces destroyed them. As a result of this, Gatsi from then on allowed Portuguese marksmen into Mutapa, while the Portuguese expanded their influence by building churches at marketplaces.

After Gatsi's forces defeated the initial leader of the Nengomasha revolt, it fell to his cattle keeper, Matuzianhe, who took control of the lands in between Masapa and Gatsi's zimbabwe, while also proclaiming himself Mwenemutapa. The Portuguese initially refused to help Gatsi, who had to threaten the captain of Masapa to gain some Portuguese support. The civil war ensued for several years, and, despite winning some battles, by 1607 Gatsi had lost control of his zimbabwe and the empire. Gatsi gained more Portuguese support by 'selling' (Note: Gatsi purportedly sold all mines to a Portuguese official who donated them to the Portuguese king. Gatsi did not own 'all mines' in Mutapa, and the concept of private ownership over natural resources was alien to the Shona.) all mines in Mutapa to them, though their combined forces were unable to defeat those of Matuzianhe. Gatsi next tried to reconquer Barue which had refused to pay tribute, though attacks by the Samungazi weakened his forces and after reaching Barue they had to retreat while suffering heavy losses. (Note: Those killed by the Samungazi included Gatsi's eldest son, and Gatsi himself was wounded twice by arrows.) (Note: Gatsi gave some land to a Portuguese official who halted Matuzianhe's advance while Gatsi was in Barue, which Mudenge said "illustrated best how some of the prazos of the Zambezi valley were established".) Manyika also broke free at this time. After sojourning in Chidima, accompanied by Portuguese reinforcements Gatsi's forces marched to Matuzianhe's capital (Gatsi's old zimbabwe), subduing chiefs as they went. Once at the capital c. 1610, they defeated Matuzianhe's forces, with Portuguese firepower proving decisive. Matuzianhe's forces later returned but were beaten again, causing his vassals to switch to Gatsi, and Matuzianhe was later assassinated by an old ally.

After a Portuguese captain promised that they would soon pay the kuruva (a tax granting permission to trade in Mutapa), Gatsi sent some ambassadors to accompany him back to Tete and transfer control of the silver mines of Chikova; meanwhile the Portuguese built a fort at Masapa, following their king's order to occupy Mutapa. When Gatsi realised that the kuruva was not going to be paid, he declared mupeto (limited war) and seized what was owed from Portuguese traders, killing some in the process. The Portuguese allied some rebels and attacked a Mutapa army led by the new Nengomasha, who escaped to Gatsi's zimbabwe. As the Portuguese prepared to conquer the Chikova mines, Gatsi offered to transfer control of them in exchange for some goods, which they accepted. However when the Portuguese arrived in Chikova, its ruler disappeared before telling them of the mines' location. Following Gatsi's advice, the Portuguese replaced the missing ruler, though the replacement claimed to not know the mines' location, and under torture admitted Gatsi desired to hide the mines from them. Spiritual leaders such as diviners and mhondoro had told Gatsi that the "discovery of silver would lead to the destruction of the empire". Meanwhile, one of Gatsi's sons (who had been baptised a Christian) betrayed him and moved to Tete to work for Portuguese interests, while a Shona nobleman's child was shot and killed for 'disrespecting' a Portuguese official. In 1615 in response, Gatsi sent a Mutapa army to attack the Portuguese fort at Chikova, though failed to take it as the Portuguese arrived with reinforcements. The same year, ordered by Gatsi's son (who pretended to be Mutapa's ambassador), the Chikova ruler showed the Portuguese some silver deposits. A new Jesuit priest arrived who strongly disliked the official whom Gatsi had heavily relied upon during the Nengomasha civil war, and he gave Gatsi permission to attack the official; Gatsi's forces did so, and conquered all the territory around Tete, while coercing the delayed payment of kuruva. In the following years, a Portuguese expedition was permitted to go to Chikova if they paid kuruva and gifted Gatsi lots of goods, though they appear to have faced similar evasive tactics as before; the Portuguese king ordered an end to these efforts and for the goods to be paid.

== Kapararidze–Mavhura succession conflict, Portuguese vassalage, and the Mukombwean revival ==
Mwenemutapa Gatsi Rusere died in 1623/4 and was succeeded by his son, Mwenemutapa Nyambo Kapararidze, despite succession rules indicating that Mavhura (his uncle, who belonged to Negomo's house) was the rightful successor. Mavhura's exclusion would have theoretically precluded his descendants' right to the kingship too (see Mutapa Empire § Succession). After Kapararidze's succession, several of his brothers attempted to seize power, one of which was likely to have been 'Dom Diogo', who had studied under Dominican friars in Portuguese Goa and may have been supported by the Portuguese. Mavhura also cultivated close relations with the Portuguese. Threatened by this, and following a possible delay in payment of kuruva or customary irregularities, Kapararidze killed a Portuguese ambassador and declared a mupeto (limited war) against all Portuguese in Mutapa. Portuguese traders managed to escape to forts at feiras, while the 'Captain of the Gates' fled to the Portuguese at Tete and Sena, who assembled a large army mainly consisting of African soldiers. In 1629 Kapararidze's forces met the Portuguese army at Masapa, where they were defeated and retreated with heavy losses. The Portuguese conquered Kapararidze's zimbabwe and again defeated the remnants of his army. The most powerful Portuguese faction supported Mavhura's accession to the kingship, and he signed terms of vassalage with the Portuguese Crown. These terms included recognising the Portuguese king's suzerainty, allowing Christian proselytisation, expelling all Muslims, allowing all Portuguese to bypass Shona royal customs and courts of law, to greatly respect the Captain of Masapa who would reside in Mavhura's zimbabwe and be consulted on "matters of war and peace", to allow free trade for Portuguese merchants, and to open up all mines (and show them the silver mines of Chikova), among other conditions. This also included a payment of 1.28 kg (2.8 lb) of gold to the Captain of Mozambique every three years (ending the kuruva), and the return of territory around Tete that Gatsi Rusere had conquered. Mavhura was later baptised. Stan Mudenge wrote "Had the treaty been capable of being fulfilled in full its provisions would have had far-reaching implications for the history of Zimbabwe. But as things turned out, the 'capitulations' of Mavhura had more teeth on paper than in reality. It was mainly the continued threat from Kapararidze that kept Mavhura friendly to the Portuguese."

In 1631, having allied Muslims who Mavhura was in the process of expelling, Kapararidze's forces caught him by surprise and routed the Mavhura—Portuguese army, capturing several key figures, though not Mavhura. Kapararidze offered peace if Mavhura acknowledged him as Mwenemutapa, though Mavhura refused. Kapararidze incited Africans in the Zambezi Valley to rise up against Portuguese settlers, who fled to Tete, Sena, and the feiras. In 1632, a Portuguese captain led an army to subdue the Valley from Quelimane to Sena, and subdued Manyika. Meanwhile, Mavhura and a Portuguese friar recruited a large army, paid for in cloth, and managed to defeat Kapararidze's forces. With the help of the Mukomohasha, Kapararidze regrouped to face Mavhura again, though he had been reinforced by the Portuguese captain. Together they soundly defeated Kapararidze, leaving the Portuguese as the main power on the Plateau, which was maintained by exploiting divisions between Mavhura's faction and the remnants of Kapararidze's. Though missions caused some Shona to convert, they remained only nominal Christians, and the Shona traditional worldview persevered. Women were more amenable to conversion because Christianity emphasised monogamy, increasing their status. Shona religious leaders however likely rejected Mavhura, making him even more reliant on Portuguese force. In 1634, the land around Tete was divided into prazos, which were then granted to Portuguese settlers. Over the course of the 17th century, prazos were established as far south as Rimuka, and their holders were incorporated into Shona political systems as madzishe (provincial chiefs) who prioritised profit above all else, such that they were independent of the Portuguese Crown. Despite undertaking several digging expeditions in Chikova, Shona guides proved unhelpful, and the Portuguese were unable to find any silver mines. In response to rumours Kapararidze was amassing an army north of the Zambezi, the Portuguese garrisoned Mavhura's zimbabwe. Prazo-holders and Portuguese traders employed private armies and regularly raided Mutapa vassals for cattle and slaves; gold mining in Mutapa was largely abandoned out of fear. Prazo-holders also often traded with chiefs' subjects directly, disrupting the hierarchical system. This lawlessness threatened to incite Mavhura's subjects into revolt and turned his court against him.

In 1652, Mavhura died after being shot, and, wary of an invasion by Kapararidze, was quickly succeeded by his son, Mwenemutapa Siti Kazurukumusapa. Siti was then baptised (which had been delayed so as not to antagonise traditionalist factions). Mudenge thought that Siti died in 1655 under unclear circumstances and was succeeded by his uncle Dom Afonso after a succession conflict, though David Beach considered Siti's reign to extend to 1663. Regardless, after the Portuguese were unable to send the Mwenemutapa a garrison, he was assassinated in 1663 by his own chiefs after a faction of prazo-holders declared war on him. A son of Mavhura, Kamharapasu Mukombwe, next ascended to the kingship with the support of the aforementioned Portuguese faction. (Note: David Beach wrote that the Mukombwe in traditions may represent the reigns of multiple rulers.) Despite being granted land, the leaders of the faction executed several land grabs, most concerningly for Mukombwe in the key feira of Dambarare. Despite the risk posed to trade, the Portuguese Crown was unwilling and unable to force the return of the land. During Mukombwe's reign, both Barue and Manyika accepted his suzerainty, and he was able to subdue several Tonga revolts, somewhat rebuilding the state. Though having been baptised, Mukombwe adhered to Shona rites and neglected Christian practices, unlike his father Mavhura. In the 1670s, Mukombwe fought a conflict against the Portuguese, and refused to acknowledge their suzerainty in 1678. During the late 1660s to c. 1680, the region was devastated by locusts, smallpox, measles, and plagues (the effects of which were worsened by insecurity), with many villages and fields left abandoned. Trade greatly decreased, and Mudenge estimated that over half of Mutapa's population may have died. Mukombwe's relationship with the Portuguese remained strained, and they ordered the remaining settlers on the Plateau to surrender their lands to Mukombwe in order to prevent war.

== Rise of the Rozvi and the Boroma–Nyamhandu conflicts ==
=== The rise of Changamire Dombo ===
Scholars differ on whether Changamire Dombo, founder of the Rozvi Empire, descended from Changamire I. Stan Mudenge considered Changamire to have been a honorific title, though others such as Catrien Van Waarden and David Beach thought it to have been a dynastic name, and Van Waarden says that Changamire I may have been the founder of the lineage that produced Changamire Dombo. Dombo was the keeper of Mwenemutapa Mukombwe's royal cattle herds which he used to gain support in the region where the moyo totem predominated (on the northeastern Zimbabwean Plateau, between the upper Mazoe and Nyadire rivers). The kuronzera system involved someone loaning their cattle to another, who was permitted to keep the cattle's product and profit from it, but not to dispose of the cattle, effectively constituting vassalage. Beach said that Dombo's rise to power likely began in the 1670s, and that he used the royal herds to gain followers before seizing some land which Mukombwe then spuriously granted to him. Throughout the 1680s and 1690s Portuguese presence in the region increased again, as they sought to revive their occupation of Mutapa. According to one source, the Portuguese in the gold-producing kingdom of Manyika paid kuruva to Dombo, and had been attacked by his forces after refusing to continue payments, causing them to move into Maungwe. Around 1683, Dombo's forces attacked the Portuguese forces of the Governor of Mozambique in Maungwe (in which the governor reportedly invested all of the Portuguese resources of the Zambezi Valley) and decisively defeated them. Mukombwe's forces opportunistically attacked Dombo before he could pursue the retreating Portuguese army, but they were also defeated, and it was reported that all Mutapa grandees and some Portuguese in Mutapa were killed. Partly due to famine and disease in the northeast, Dombo then went south with his followers (Note: They were called "Rozvi", from the verb kurozva meaning "to destroy".) to conquer the Kingdom of Butua, whose mambo may have been in a weakened position since Butua's civil war. He spent the following years consolidating his rule over Butua.

In 1687, Mukombwe is reported to have had friendly relations with the Portuguese Crown, and received some assistance in defeating a revolt. Mukombwe died around 1692, and was succeeded by his brother, Mwenemutapa Nyakunembire. The Portuguese had intended for Nyamhande (Pedro Mhande) to be installed, who was Mukombwe's son and a devout Christian, and (not understanding Mutapa's collateral succession) they considered Nyakunembire to be a usurper. Nyakunembire may have been supported to the kingship by Dombo, and he requested Dombo's assistance against the Portuguese. In 1693 Dombo attacked feiras, starting with Dambarare. He killed everyone at Dambarare and destroyed its church; all feiras were subsequently abandoned save for ones in Manyika, and traders fled to Nyakunembire's zimbabwe where a Portuguese official was scheming to assassinate him, though they soon fled to Tete after receiving safe passage from a Mutapa chief. Dombo likely continued to wreak havoc, burning down Masapa, and at some point relations between him and Nyakunembire soured. Mhande joined forces the Portuguese, and together they attempted to engage Nyakunembire, but were attacked by the Samungazi Tonga, causing the Portuguese to retreat. Nyakunembire sent an army to attack Mhande but it was defeated with assistance from Portuguese settlers. Those at Tete incurred heavy debts and joined forces with Mhande, ready to attack Nyakunembire's zimbabwe; Nyakunembire fled to Dombo, who was campaigning in Maungwe and Manyika, and Mhande was declared Mwenemutapa. The fate of Nyakunembire is unclear, though he may have been appointed Chikanga (king) of Manyika by Dombo in 1695 and founded its Mutasa dynasty.

=== The genesis of the Boroma–Nyamhandu conflicts ===
Mhande died c. 1698, and was succeeded by his brother Mwenemutapa Chirimbe (Dom Manuel). The Portuguese instead favoured Constantino do Rosario, a son of Mhande, because they wanted to retain ownership over silver mines in Chikova that Mhande had granted them. Both Constantino and his brother travelled to Goa in India to study Dominican Christianity. In 1702, Samutumbu Nyamhandu overthrew Chirimbe with support from the Rozvi Changamire (Dombo had died c. 1696), though Chirimbe was reinstated a year later with assistance from the Portuguese. Samutumbu conquered some prazos near Tete in 1708 after a clergyman abducted one of his daughters. Chirimbe died c. 1711 and was succeeded by Mwenemutapa Boroma Dangwarangwa (Dom João), who, as a brother of Chirimbe, the Portuguese again viewed as a usurper, and they sought to install Constantino as a puppet; Constantino however refused because he wished to remain devoted to the Dominican life. Dangwaranga maintained good relations with the Portuguese, but around 1712 Samutumbu, assisted by the Changamire, killed Dangwaranga in battle along with some Portuguese; the Rozvi caused so much damage to Mutapa's lands, that Samutumbu had to be compelled to take the kingship, and the Changamire placed a Rozvi official in his zimbabwe and imposed conditions of vassalage. Seeking to regain independence, Samutumbu maintained a hostile façade to the Portuguese but built good relations with them in secret. The Portuguese sent Samutumbu a garrison, which the Changamire condemned but did not remove. The Portuguese requested that Samutumbu allow them to enter Mutapa again, however Samutumbu asked that they wait until he had consolidated his authority. Despite the close relations, the Portuguese plotted to replace Samutumbu; on hearing of this betrayal, Samutumbu attacked them in an ambush. Samutumbu died c. 1718, having mended relations with the Portuguese before his death. The following decades were characterised by conflict between the Nyamhandu and Boroma royal houses, to which Samutumbu and Dangwarangwa respectively belonged. According to one source, Samutumbu's death caused a succession conflict between the two houses, and a mhondoro (royal spirit/medium) declared that the kingship would rotate between the two houses. Prior to c. 1704, the Mwenemutapa had been regarded as the supreme power in the state with subordinate chiefs, but from then on he was more akin to 'first among equals' as the conflicts weakened central authority, with the state becoming confederal and held together by a large military composed of companies (boka) of vanyai (young men who trained as fighters because they were unable to care for cattle in the tsetse-infested Valley).

Sources differ on who succeeded Samutumbu. The following years saw several short reigns as rivals ousted rivals, until the ascension of Mwenemutapa João V Nyamhandu around 1723, who had been opposed by the Portuguese from as early as 1719. From 1723 onwards the capital was located in the Zambezi Valley rather than on the Plateau. João V's reign was reportedly peaceful and lengthy. In 1735, he warmly received a canonical visit to the parish in his zimbabwe. The bishop asked João V to allow for the re-establishment of several feiras on the Plateau, which he accepted in return for some goods. However the few Portuguese traders that resettled the feiras struggled to make profit, and the insecurity from the succession conflict following João V's death sometime before 1743 caused their abandonment. Several short reigns by members of the Boroma and Nyamhandu houses followed the death of João V, until a son of his, Mwenemutapa Debwe II, took power. Debwe II waged war to take the kingship and caused destruction and abandonment in lands belonging to the Portuguese Crown, with this possibly dating to 1743 and 1744. He also curtailed the power of several prazo-dynasties, as the state bordered three large prazos (Massangano, Massingire, and Makanga). After his death, Debwe II was succeeded by his brother, Mwenemutapa Debwe Mupunzagutu. Debwe II had reportedly maintained authority over his vassals, though during Mupunzagutu's reign they gradually drifted out of his control as he spent much of his time smoking dagga (mbanje) and composing songs on his mbira. Around 1760, Mupunzagutu was assassinated by his brother Zindove, after which the state is said to have disintegrated into principalities. Mudenge wrote that this disintegration is difficult to verify, but said that Dande did split away from the state, and that the remnants in Chidima continued to be contested over by the Boroma and Nyamhandu houses.

== Confinement to Chidima and the Scramble ==
Mupunzagutu's death plunged the state into a period of regular conflict amid struggles over the kingship and lawlessness, greatly disrupting ordinary life for Mutapa's population. Several short reigns followed, and the conflict spread to repel the prazos that had encroached on Mutapa's territory during Mupunzagutu's reign. Mwenemutapa Zindove was soon defeated by Kamota (another brother) and fled to Dande to seek reinforcements, where its breakaway ruler (Dewere) killed him. Mwenemutapa Kamota feared the return of Karidza, a blind son of Dangwaranga who had reigned after João V and later fled to the Maravi. Kamota embarked on a military campaign across the Zambezi to confront Karidza, but was either killed or exiled, with Karidza's son Mutanyikwa ascending to the kingship in 1761. A year later, Mutanyikwa fled to join his father after an army led by Zezi (a brother of Zindove and Kamota) advanced on his zimbabwe. It was reported that by 1768 two rulers had died in civil war, possibly referring to Mutanyikwa and Zezi, and another had taken the kingship, likely to have been Mwenemutapa Ganyambadzi. Several princes rebelled against Ganyambadzi, though one attacked the Portuguese and was later captured by them. Relations between Ganyambadzi and the Portuguese soured after a prominent trader was robbed in Mutapa and rumours of a plot to capture a captain-major. The Portuguese attacked the Mwenemutapa's vanyai (who also served as messengers) and a prince called Changara advanced on Ganyanmabzi, who fled across the Zambezi. Changara signed a 1769 treaty with the Portuguese permitting freedom of movement in Mutapa, gold mining, and the re-establishment of feiras such as Dambarare, and he also promised them tribute. However the re-establishment of the feiras did not materialise because trade through Zumbo, which had been experiencing a downturn, rebounded soon after. Despite the treaty, relations rapidly deteriorated the following year after a Mutapa official invaded some of the Portuguese Crown's lands and they in turn declared war on Changara; relations were however quickly mended. In 1772, after being forced to leave Undi's lands (a Maravi leader), Ganyambadzi blockaded Zumbo, but this was broken by the combined forces of Changara, the Rozvi, and the Portuguese. Ganyambadzi had likely regained the kingship sometime before 1776, but in that year Ganyambadzi retreated to Barue, where he installed a puppet ruler. Changara had reportedly fled across the Zambezi by 1780, and began trying to rebuild his power base. The holder of the Mutapa kingship remained unclear.

Ganyambadzi sought Portuguese recognition as Mwenemutapa, and in 1780 the Portuguese sent a mission to his zimbabwe which distributed many gifts and asked Ganyambadzi to secure trade routes to Manyika in return. Despite some contact between the Portuguese and Changara, of which Ganyambadzi was deeply suspicious, peaceful relations were maintained throughout his reign, and Ganyambadzi died in 1784/5. Despite Changara's efforts, Ganyambadzi was succeeded by Mwenemutapa Bangoma, who had previously been imprisoned by the Portuguese for attacking their lands but had escaped. Around 1794, Bangoma was accused of robbing some traders, and by December that year Changara had assumed the kingship. From around 1795 to 1800, the region experienced a severe drought. Several chiefs and princes (as well as Bangoma and Mhondoro Matope) were rumoured to be plotting to attack Zumbo. In 1804, likely following a dispute with the Portuguese, a chief called Mburuma attacked Zumbo, causing the abandonment of its feira and exacerbating the downturn in Zambezian trade following the drought. By 1806, Bangoma was reported to be the mambo (king) of Chidima, though he was supplanted by an elderly prince who was succeeded by Mwenemutapa Chifombo (son of Changara) in 1806/7. In 1807 a Portuguese general led an army in pursuit of a rogue trader, and passed through Mutapa. On their way, they passed by some villages that served as matsanza (royal graves; walking too close to such sacred sites was a criminal offence) and burned them down. The general also enslaved several people associated with the Mwenemutapa. Seeking to prevent the graves' spirits' angered proliferation of disasters in the country, Chifombo declared war on the general and, after overwhelming the Portuguese army, captured him. Despite initially asking for ransom payments, Chifombo was convinced by several princes and court members to have the general executed. Relations with the Portuguese broke down, and, other than in 1826, they ceased paying tribute or gifting presents to the Mwenemutapa until 1841. This break in relations has limited the information on the Mutapa state during this period.

Little is known of Chifombo's reign, however a rivalry between two princes (Chipute and Kadeya) recorded in 1810 may indicate a succession conflict at that time, and a Mwenemutapa called "Amatua" (possibly Bangoma) was in power by 1811. Zumbo's feira was reopened in 1820, though Portuguese–Mutapa relations were only re-established in 1826. During Kandeya's reign in the 1820s the Mutapa state saw drought, famine, and civil wars. By 1830 Kandeya had been forced to abandon his zimbabwe by an invading prince named Dzeka, who later assumed the kingship sometime in the 1830s. During his reign the region was invaded by Nguni groups who had fled in the Mfecane, displacing local groups and disrupting all trade, however the poor conditions for cattle-keeping in Chidima and the broader Zambezi Valley prevented their settlement in Mutapa. By 1843 Mwenemutapa Kataruza was in power, and was described by David Livingstone as "a chief of no great power". Despite this, Kataruza reportedly had around one hundred wives, and Europeans still paid him in goods such as calico for safe passage through Chidima. Kataruza supported Nhaude of the Massangano prazo against another prazo-holder in the wars of 1853–1855, and his army killed many Portuguese soldiers as they retreated from Massangano. Kataruza had many minor chiefs in Chidima who he referred to as his 'sons', though they had so much autonomy such that they were practically each independent. From the 1860s onwards, the Portuguese Crown revived its power in the Valley by campaigning against and conquering the prazos. Kataruza died in 1867 and was succeeded by his son Kandeya II, who Mhondoro Matope (Matope's spirit/medium) convinced to support Bonga of Massangano against the Portuguese Crown, dismantling the peaceful yet submissive relations Kataruza had maintained. The Portuguese invaded Mutapa and shot Mhondoro Matope dead, conquering part of Chidima and forcing Kandeya II and his forces to flee. Around 1876 Kandeya II was succeeded by Mwenemutapa Dzuda (likely a son of Dzeka). Dzuda's army reportedly hassled Zumbo's traders, and he allied Massangano's ruler while seeking to reconquer lands which had been lost to the Portuguese. In 1884 the Portuguese attacked Mutapa and curtailed Dzuda's power, annexing Chidima a year later and forcing Dzuda into exile. The British ultimatum to the Portuguese in 1890 led to the partition of Mutapa's former territories between the two colonial powers.

=== Resistance against the Portuguese ===
Both Dzuda and his successor Chioko Dambamupute organised resistance against the Portuguese. Chioko, a brother of Kandeya II, ousted Dzuda from the exile community during the 1890s and, with the help of Mhondoro Matope, led an anti-Portuguese coalition which allied with Chief Mapondera and attacked Portuguese centres in the Zambezi Valley up to Tete from 1897. In 1900 the resistance was joined by Massangano and the Barue, and by 1901 Chioko's forces (with Mapondera leading the military) were in control of most of modern-day Tete Province, as his dream of re-establishing the Mutapa Empire's former glory neared realisation. However in 1902 Chioko was killed while assisting the Barue against the Portuguese, and his successor, Kamanika, failed to command the same authority over the broad coalition, shattering these efforts as the Portuguese suppressed the rebellion.
