= Rozvi Empire =

Shona state (c. 1683–1866) in present-day Zimbabwe

- c. 1683–1866
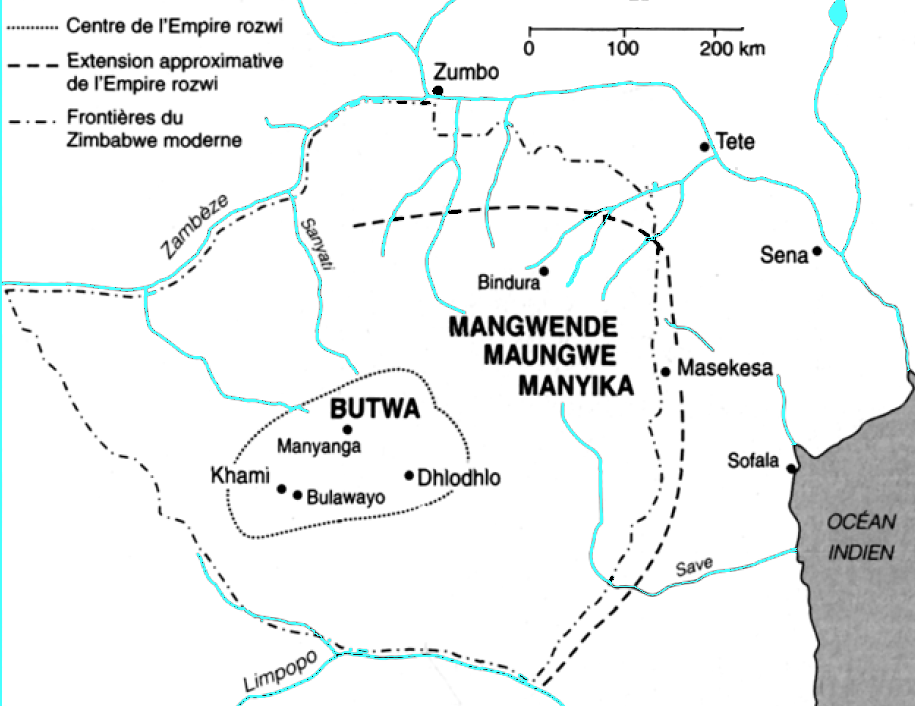
- Map showing the extent of the Rozvi empire and its center around Butua
- Capital: Danamombe
- Common languages: iKalanga (adopted)
- Religion: Shona traditional religion
- Government: Monarchy
- Changamire
  - c. 1683–c. 1696: Changamire Dombo (first)
  - ?–1866: Tohwechipi (last sovereign)
- History
  - Rise of Changamire Dombo: 1670s/80s
  - Rozvi conquest of Butua: c. 1683
  - Nguni invasions: 1830s
  - Surrender of Tohwechipi: 1866
Preceded by
Mutapa Empire
Kingdom of Butua
Succeeded by
Venda Kingdom
Nambya state
Shangwe Confederacy
Mthwakazi
- Today part of: Zimbabwe, Botswana

The Rozvi Empire (c. 1683–1866) was a Shona state established by Changamire Dombo on the Zimbabwean Plateau. During its existence it was the dominant force on the Plateau, and boasted a large military with a fearsome reputation.

Early in the 17th century, Mutapa was vassalised by the Portuguese, and over the following decades Portuguese settlers regularly raided its Shona subjects on the Plateau, while disease and famine devastated the region. The 1670s and '80s saw the rise of Changamire Dombo (a Mutapa governor who used royal cattle herds to gain followers); Dombo defeated the Portuguese and Mutapa in battle before turning south to conquer Butua c. 1683. In the 1690s, he came to the aid of a Mutapa ruler and massacred Portuguese traders, expelling all Portuguese from the Plateau. He also conquered Manyika before his death c. 1696. The following decades saw several succession conflicts, and some offshoots of its dynasty migrated to found states elsewhere.

Throughout the 18th and early-19th centuries, the Rovzi state struggled to control the influx of many groups who conquered its subjects and sometimes ceased paying tribute, weakening Rozvi power. A severe drought occurred between 1795 and 1800, during which Changamire Rupandamananga was said to have let his people starve, sparking a series of civil wars which lasted up until at least 1808. The state persevered through another major drought in the 1820s, but invasions in quick succession from Nguni groups during the Mfecane in the 1830s spelled its end; the Rozvi army managed to fend off the first few invading groups, but around 1835 Changamire Chirisamhuru was killed by Nyamazana's Ngoni, leaving the state headless and leadership fragmented between royal houses. Around 1838 the various houses were conquered and subdued by Mzilikazi's Ndebele. Chirisamhuru's son, Tohwechipi, rebelled against Ndebele rule, but was defeated and he finally surrendered after a lengthy siege in 1866.

There is little information available on the Rozvi Empire, in part because the Portuguese were barred from entering it (meaning contemporary written accounts were second-hand), and because the preservation of oral traditions was greatly disrupted by 18th- and early-19th-century migrations into the region, as well as the Ndebele and British conquests of the 1840s and 1890s respectively.

== Etymology ==
The name "Rozvi" is widely considered to derive from the Karanga word kurozva meaning "to destroy" (with Varozvi meaning "the destroyers"), in reference to Changamire Dombo and his followers' conquests in the 1680s and '90s. Other names for the state included Vurozvi, Ukalanga, Gore, and Goremukuru.

== History ==
=== Changamire I and Mutapa ===
A 1506 account by Diogo de Alcáçova mentions a 'Changamire' (Note: Some scholars have proposed that "Changamire" was a portmanteau of the name "Changa" and "amir" (meaning "governor"). According to Catrien Van Waarden, Changamire means "Governor Cha", where "ng" is an epenthesis that makes pronunciation easier.) (termed "Changamire I" by historians) who revolted against Mutapa in the 1490s. The genealogy of Changamire I has been the subject of speculation by scholars. Some scholars say he was a member of the Torwa dynasty of Butua or a friend of them, while others say he was a son of Mwenemutapa Matope or that he married one of Matope's daughters. After analysing Valoyi traditions, Mathebula and Mokgoatšana say that Changamire was likely a descendant of both dynasties, being the son of Matope or having married Matope's daughter (or both were true and he married his sister).

According to Alcáçova's account, rumours were spread by others close to Mwenemutapa Mukombero that Changamire, an influential Mutapa governor and member of the Torwa dynasty, was plotting for the kingship, leading Mukombero to order Changamire to undertake a poison trial, wherein if he drank the poison (muteyo) and were harmed by it, he would be deemed guilty. Accordingly, c. 1490 Changamire led an army to Mukombwe's zimbabwe and killed him, afterwards assuming the kingship. He is also said to have killed 21 of Mukombwe's sons, with Chikuyo Chisamarengu being the only one to escape. Around 1494, Chikuyo returned with a large army, and they fought a long and deadly battle ending in Changamire I's death. Chikuyo assumed the kingship and consolidated his rule over the empire, except for 'Guruuswa' which stayed loyal to the successor Changamire II; over the course of the following decades the Mwenemutapa is known to have fought Changamire II (likely aided by Butua) intermittently, until at least 1512. (Note: According to João Velho's 1547 letter, a Muslim trader, supported by the Portuguese, led a campaign to expel a "Changamira" from the lands around the "River of Sofala" (either the Buzi or Pungwe river), and supplanted his rule there by conquest, distributing gifts, and encouraging his subjects to revolt. Several scholars considered this to have been the final defeat of the Changamires, though Stan Mudenge wrote that "Changamira" referred to the Sachiteve (either Nyamunda or his successor Chipute) as a continuation of Nyamunda's wars in the territory.)

Scholars differ on whether Changamire Dombo, the founder of the Rozvi Empire, descended from Changamire I. Stan Mudenge considered Changamire to have been a honorific title, though others such as Catrien Van Waarden and David Beach thought it to have been a dynastic name, and Van Waarden says that Changamire I may have been the founder of the lineage that produced Dombo.

=== Origins and the conquests of Changamire Dombo ===
The followers of Changamire Dombo came from an area in the northeast of the Zimbabwean Plateau, between the upper Mazoe and Nyadire rivers where the moyo (heart) totem predominated. Following the ascension of Mavhura to the Mutapa kingship in 1629 during his war with Kapararidze, Mutapa became a Portuguese vassal. The following decades saw widespread lawlessness as Portuguese prazo-holders in Mutapa—who were outside the jurisdiction of the Mwenemutapa's courts due to the terms of the vassalage treaty—regularly raided and enslaved their Shona neighbours (and even deposed a Mwenemutapa), with the Portuguese Crown unable and unwilling to stop them, infuriating provincial chiefs. From the late 1660s to '80s, the wider region was devastated by locusts, smallpox, measles, and plagues (the effects of which were worsened by insecurity), with many villages and fields left abandoned. Trade greatly decreased, and Mudenge estimated that over half of Mutapa's population may have died.

Changamire Dombo (called Dombolakonachingwango or Chikurawadyembeu in traditions) (Note: David Beach wrote that the Dombo in traditions may represent the reigns of multiple rulers.) is reported to have either been the keeper of Mwenemutapa Mukombwe's royal cattle herds which he used to gain support in moyo territory, or the leader of a Mutapa army who rebelled. Both Mudenge and Beach considered the former to be true. The kuronzera system involved someone loaning their cattle to another, who was permitted to keep the cattle's product and profit from it, but not to dispose of the cattle, effectively constituting vassalage. Beach said that Dombo's rise to power likely began in the 1670s, and that he used the royal herds to gain followers, before seizing some land which Mukombwe then spuriously granted to him. Portuguese presence in Mutapa had been greatly reduced by the disasters, and in the early 1680s the Portuguese Crown ordered settlers to leave Mutapa to prevent Mukombwe's rebellion. However, throughout the 1680s and '90s Portuguese presence in the region increased again, as they sought to revive their occupation of Mutapa. According to one source, the Portuguese in the gold-producing kingdom of Manyika paid kuruva (a tax permitting trade) to Dombo, and had been attacked by his forces after refusing to continue payments, causing them to move into Maungwe. Around 1683, Dombo's forces attacked the forces of the Portuguese Governor of Mozambique in Maungwe (in which the governor reportedly invested all of the Portuguese resources of the Zambezi Valley) and decisively defeated them. (Note: During the battle, Dombo's forces, armed with bows and arrows, were taking heavy casualties against the Portuguese who had arquebuses. Dombo ordered his men to keep fighting throughout the day, and sent women who accompanied the army to collect firewood. By night, the battle was undecided, and the Portuguese chose to camp on the battlefield. In the middle of the night, the Portuguese and their African soldiers awoke to find they were surrounded by a ring of fire (made using the firewood), causing them to scatter.) But before Dombo could pursue the retreating army, his land was attacked by Mukombwe's forces, which he also defeated; it was reported that all Mutapa grandees and some Portuguese in Mutapa were killed.

With his followers, c. 1683 Dombo next turned to the Kingdom of Butua in the southwest of the Plateau. This out-migration was partly due to famine and disease in the northeast, but also because the mambo (king) of Butua (which was wealthy) had recently won a civil war with Portuguese assistance, and their withdrawal may have left the mambo in a weak position. A drier climate after c. 1675 may have also incentivised Rozvi out-migration, while also weakening Butua's mambo's legitimacy as he failed to bring rain. Rozvi traditions say that in Butua there were two rulers, Chibundule (Note: The first Butua mambo was Madabhale of the Torwa dynasty, who had the praise name Chibundule (meaning "sounding of the war horn"). Kalanga oral traditions collected in 1922 compress the history of the Torwa dynasty into that of one ruler called Chibundule, such that the story of Chibundule represents that of Butua.) and Tumbare of the soko (monkey/baboon) and bepe (calabash) totems respectively, who both lived on hills (symbolising power and royalty), and that Dombo built his own hill taller than theirs. Kalanga (Butua) traditions say that Dombo was only able to defeat Chibundule (represented as having supernatural powers) by giving Chibundule his daughter/sister in marriage who cut his braids (worn like a horn on the fontanelle, symbolising power). Gifting a relative as a wife was often an act of submission, and one account said that Dombo initially paid tribute to Butua. Chibundule is then said to have been defeated in battle, before fleeing to the Matombo a Bhuba mountains where he disappeared. Kalanga traditions also mention Tumbare, but only as a Chief Councillor of Dombo, though they do detail how Tumbare's father attempted to take power three times (the third involving Chibundule's marriage). Van Waarden said that, along with the possible relations from Changamire I, Dombo's mother may have been Torwa as her lineage is said to have had the soko totem. Van Waarden concludes that factionalism in Butua likely allowed Dombo to support Tumbare to the Butua kingship, before "pushing him aside". Dombo spent the following years consolidating his rule in Butua.

Around 1693, Dombo may have supported Mwenemutapa Nyakunembire to the Mutapa kingship, foiling Portuguese plans to install their preferred candidate, and Nyakunembire requested Dombo's assistance against the Portuguese. In 1693 Dombo's forces attacked the feira (marketplace) of Dambarare, killing all its inhabitants and burning its church; all feiras were subsequently abandoned save for ones in Manyika as Portuguese traders fled, eventually reaching Tete. Dombo's forces likely continued to wreak havoc, burning down Masapa, and at some point relations between him and Nyakunembire soured. Dombo left to pursue his own interests elsewhere on the Plateau. By 1694 Dombo was back in the northeast campaigning in Maungwe, at which time Nyakunembire was ousted by the Portuguese candidate, causing him to flee to Dombo. Mudenge wrote that Dombo could have intervened and returned Nyakunembire back to power, but chose not to. In 1695 Dombo's forces invaded Manyika, forcing the temporary abandonment of its feiras, and replacing its Chikanga (king) with his own candidate, possibly Nyakunembire. From then on, Manyika was a Rozvi vassal. Following these battles and conquests, the Rozvi gained a reputation for ferocity and invincibility, said to have been due to their war drums. Throughout Dombo's reign, the Portuguese were terrified of possible attacks on Tete, Sena, and Sofala, viewing their own expulsion from the Plateau as comeuppance for their previous actions, however these did not happen as Dombo died c. 1696.

=== After Dombo ===
Following Dombo's death, there was a succession dispute involving his sons, one of which ("Sababec" according to a Portuguese record) hurried back to Butua from the campaign in Manyika. In the late-17th century, members of the Changamire dynasty migrated southwards to the Soutpansberg to found the Venda Kingdom at Dzata, with traditions mentioning "political dissension". Around the early-18th century, a group of Rozvi led by Sawanga migrated north to the Lower Gwai and founded the Nambya state at Hwange. Thomas Huffman considered both of these migrations to have been led by losing sons of the succession dispute. Another Rozvi group led by Chireya overcame the Shangwe Confederacy on the Mafungabusi Plateau. One Rozvi tradition says that the position of Changamire was offered to Washaya who refused it, and Nechasike (Note: Nechasike means "Lord Cha, the Creator, the First". In Kalanga traditions, the history of the Rozvi from the 1680s to the 1830s is compressed into the reign of one ruler named Nechasike.) or Nechapingura (Note: Nechapingura means "Lord Cha, the Churner of Milk".) ascended instead. Another tradition says that Dombo's successor was assisted by Kalanga ruler "Ndumba" (who was married to his sister, and possibly identified with Tumbare). In 1702, the Changamire raided Mutapa and helped Samutumbu Nyamhandu overthrow Mwenemutapa Chirimbe, though Chirimbe was reinstated a year later with Portuguese support.

The Rozvi did not allow the Portuguese to re-establish their feiras on the Plateau, except for one at Manyika c. 1715. Instead, a feira at Zumbo in the Zambezi Valley was founded around 1720, and became the main centre for Rozvi–Portuguese trade, while also relying on the Rozvi military for its security. The prohibition on Portuguese entering the Rozvi state meant that the trade was done through intermediaries (vashambadzi). Nechasike was succeeded by his brother Nechagadsike, (Note: Nechagadzike means "Lord Cha the Installer (of chiefs)".) who David Beach said may have lived until 1767. In 1768, civil war ensued between a previous ruler's son and a candidate Portuguese records described as a "usurper", with the 'usurper' eventually defeated and killed. (Note: The Portuguese did not understand (or pretended to not understand) the Shona system of succession, wherein brother succeeded brother, and viewed non-primogeniture successors as "usurpers".) In 1772, the Rozvi army dislodged a blockade of Zumbo by a rival to the Mwenemutapa. Throughout the 18th and early-19th centuries, the region received migrations of Tswana, Birwa, Hlengwe, and Karanga populations which the Rozvi were unable to stem or control; these groups overcame most of the Changamire's tributary subjects and sometimes discontinued payments of tribute. Though the Changamire had a large and powerful able to travel long distances, it was not able to project control everywhere at once, and many of these migrations constituted conquests that the Changamire retrospectively approved via land grants.

=== Internal conflict, resistance, and Ndebele conquest ===
Rupandamananga ruled in the late-18th century, who tradition says callously failed to feed the population during drought (coming to be called Rupengo, "mad"). Rozvi traditions say that when the Mhari invaded the upper Runde Valley, a Rozvi conspiracy brought Rupandamananga into conflict with them and left him to die on the battlefield. Stan Mudenge identified this with the major drought recorded between 1795 and 1800 which he said sparked a series of civil wars and set in motion the disintegration of the empire, continuing up until at least 1808. David Beach however disputed this narrative and wrote that the cause of state's collapse lay in the misfortune of the 1830s. Accordingly, the Mhari supported Gumboremvura (Note: Gumboremvura means "rain leg", indicating that he was more successful in rainmaking.) to the kingship, who was likely in power by 1802 and is remembered as a popular ruler. In Shona customs, losing candidates to the kingship were given territory near the capital; by 1802, one such branch of the Changamire dynasty was the Mutinhima house (whose origins vary), and its leader was reportedly the second most powerful position in the state. During Gumboremvura's reign, the Mutinhima house unsuccessfully revolted with support from the sekuru houses of Nerwande and Mavudzi, which were close advisors to the Changamire and ritually powerful. Mudenge wrote that the sekuru houses may have joined the revolt because Gumboremvura claimed to be the chief rainmaker, which would have disempowered the priesthood. He said that the plot was to assassinate Gumboremvura, and that when it was discovered the conspirators were expelled from the royal court, possibly damaging relations between the kingship and priesthood institutions in the long-term.

After Gumboremvura's death, the kingship was contested by the Dyembeu title-holder and Chirisamhuru, which Chirisamhuru won with the assistance of the Dyembeu's own sons. The rise of the Khurutse and Kaa in the Shoshong Hills from the late-18th century threatened the Rozvi's control over its Kalanga subjects in the west. By 1817, the Ngwato led by Kgadi had migrated north of Serowe and they raided the Kalanga in the Matopos Hills up until Kgadi's death in battle in 1826. A major drought from 1824 to 1829 contributed to political instability. By 1831, despite the drought, the Rozvi state had persevered, but throughout the 1830s it was invaded by no less than six groups which had fled during the Mfecane. In 1832 the Rozvi army managed to defeat and repel Mpanga's Sotho from the west and the Ngwana Maseko from the south, but a year later Zwangendaba's Ngoni entered the state and wreaked devastation before they were pushed northeast. They left the Plateau in 1835; that same year the state was invaded by warrior-queen Nyamazana's Ngoni (who had separated from Zwangendaba). The Rozvi won the first battle, but were overwhelmed by Nyamazana's attack on Danamombe; Chirisamhuru fled to Manyanga but was killed by her forces on the way there.

During the invasions, the Ngoni depleted Rozvi herds. After Chirisamhuru's death the state lay intact but headless; although it was possible to rebuild its defences, leadership remained fragmented between royal houses. Nxaba's Ngoni briefly passed through in 1836. Further south, the Ndebele had split into two groups led by Gundwane and Mzilikazi; Gundwane's group (the larger of the two) reached the upper Mzingwane Valley (next to the Rozvi state) in 1839 where they settled. Gundwane attempted to make Mzilikazi's son king, however Mzilikazi's prompt arrival sparked a civil war in which he was victorious. Mzilikazi's Ndebele invaded the Rozvi and defeated the Mutinhima house, after which many of the other royal houses submitted one by one. The Rozvi paid tribute in the form of levies of young men and received cattle in return. Rozvi traditions sometimes attribute the state's collapse amid catastrophic misfortune to Mwari punishing them for having sinned, with different versions narrating the burning of Mwari's stone structure by a heretic son of the Changamire, an attempt to kill Mwari by a heretic ruler who desecrated places where he spoke, or the failure to make offerings to Mwari after a military victory (referring to conflict between established worship of Mwari and the more-recent Mwari cave-cult).

A son of Chirisamhuru, Tohwechipi, retreated east, though during the 1840s he returned at the invitation of Mzilikazi as a tributary. Tohwechipi was later recognised as Changamire by the Mutinhima house and the Portuguese, and led several Shona groups to raid Ndebele villages and cattle. War ensued over the following years, but by 1857 Tohwechipi had been defeated and fled to the Mavangwe Hills on the upper Save Valley. Throughout the 1850s, Tohwechipi was joined along the Valley by other Rozvi, including the houses of Tumbare and Mutinhima, who conquered its local populations. There, he continued to resist the Ndebele, but surrendered after a lengthy siege in 1866. Despite having been captured, Mzilikazi allowed Tohwechipi to go free. He was buried in Mavangwe, where his grave continues to be a sacred national monument in Zimbabwe.

=== Colonial and postcolonial periods: efforts to revive the position ===
After Tohwechipi's death, his son, Muposi Chikore, failed to gain widespread recognition from the Rozvi, and most Rozvi left Mavangwe. One Mutinhima group led by Jiri moved to Bikita (in the remnants of the Duma Confederacy), and in 1895 his dynasty gained recognition from the British colonial government as the Rozvi chiefs of Bikita. (Note: In 1965, during the Rhodesian Bush War, the Duma attacked Rozvi territory, forcing the Jiri house to relocate to Gokwe.) In 1896, the Rozvi that remained in Mavangwe and elsewhere invited Chingombe of the Mutinhima house to the position of Mambo/Changamire, but as an old man his reign was short and he died in 1904. The Tumbare house (located in Buhera) acted as regents in his final years, during which they were assigned the title of Headman by the colonial government. Jiri appointed a man named Mandu as Changamire but he died only months later, after which the Tumbare ruled as regents. In 1918, a son of Chingombe named Mudavanhu rose to the position, but used the title Chingombe officially and that of Changamire or Mambo only unofficially.

Efforts to revive the position gained currency c. 1930, and included lobbying the colonial government, though the various Rozvi groups struggled to settle on a candidate among the dispersed dynasties. In 1951, the Chingombe title was officially reduced to "Headmanship" along with many others. Over the following decades the contest for the position of leader of the Rozvi remained a minor aspect of Rhodesian politics relative to broader current of African nationalism opposed to the colonial government. In 1957, following a lengthy campaign of lobbying and political manoeuvring, Mujuru Chiminya (a grandson of one of Chingombe's brothers and possibly a former mambo's svikiro) was installed as "Mambo Munhumutapa" by the Mavudzi house, but failed to gain recognition from other houses or the colonial government, going on to lose his case in the Supreme Court. (Note: In 1957, together with a Zimbabwean entrepeneur, he organised a "grand meeting" of Rozvi to elect a Mambo, during which he won only 52 votes from the 400 attendees, losing to Tabvemiri, brother of the Chingombe, who received 271.) Meanwhile Noah Washaya (of the Washaya house) had been lobbying for support more effectively, both from Rozvi and colonial officials, and was elected Mambo by the Kwekwe Rozvi in 1959, but (despite lots of publicity, and consideration from a government official aiming to counter ZAPU) failed to get recognition from other houses and the colonial government in the years that followed. In 2019 during a ceremony at Esigodini , Mike Moyo (an activist against the movement to revive the Ndebele monarchy) was installed as "King Mambo" of the Rozvi, with endorsements from several cabinet ministers.

== Government ==
=== Central government ===
The state was headed by a Mambo (king/emperor) of the Changamire dynasty, and its capital was Danamombe (also called "Dhlo Dhlo" in Ndebele). One tradition says that Dombo stayed in "Chivari" before moving to Danamombe, and Naletale may have been used by the mambo at times. In the state's final years, the capital may have been at Manyanga, near where Chirisamhuru died. The mambo had a dale (council) whose positions were filled by Dombo's close advisors (makulukoto) and inherited by their lineages. They included four Chief Councillors, namely Nhale (of the moyo (heart) totem, father of Meng'we who ruled over eastern Botswana), Mabhaya Gomo (bepe (calabash), father of Tumbare, head of the military), Ninjigwe (keeper of cannons seized from the Portuguese, which appeared in praises), and Ngomane (gumbo (leg), Chief Diviner). Along with the Chief Councillors, the dale included two sekuru (mother's brother) lineages (Nerwande and Mavudzi), who later fulfilled the role of priests and rainmakers. There was also Bagedze Moyo, the daughter/sister of Dombo who in traditions married Chibundule and curtailed his power; she served as the leader of women, and was allocated some of the state's wealth. These positions sought to represent various segments of society, including the military, local government, women, and the priesthood (and by extension the ancestors and Mwali (God)), as well as public opinion. The mambo's dale advised him at the khuta (royal court), which saw to national matters and was primarily attended by men. Contrary to other Shona states, royal women generally did not hold prominent and powerful roles in central or provincial government, though they still commanded respect and fulfilled diplomatic marriages. The mambo also had a small group of bodyguards consisting of unmarried young men (mwanamwana).

Succession to the kingship passed collaterally from brother to brother, first to the deceased mambo's eldest brother, then on to the next-eldest, and eventually to brothers of different houses (i.e. different mothers), before passing on to the next generation and the eldest son of the eldest brother, and so forth. As with the Mutapa state, this rotation between houses caused much conflict within the royal family, and rulers often relied on support from outside of it. Losing candidates were compensated by being allocated land near the capital. The population of the state was composed of three groups: the people of the moyo totem (which included the ruling dynasty), the non-moyo people who accompanied them in their migration from the northeast, and the Kalanga. The Kalanga included Butua's ruling class, which was incorporated into the state and intermarried with the Changamire dynasty. As part of their integration, the Kalanga dialect was adopted by the Rozvi, though they retained the "r" sound. The mambo's position depended on maintaining support from all of these groups.

=== Administration ===
The administration of the state likely followed traditional Shona political organisation, wherein directly under the mambo were chiefs (sing. ishe) who led provincial chiefdoms (sing. nyika), which contained regions (sing. dunhu) headed by lesser chiefs (sing. sadunhu), in turn consisting of villages (sing. musha) headed by village heads (sing. samusha), which were composed of neighbourhoods (sing. mana) each headed by a samana, and then the families or huts (sing. imba) headed by family heads or householders (sing. saimba). The state was composed of concentric zones, wherein the territory around the capital was ruled directly by the mambo, a zone surrounding this ruled by royals, another outer zone ruled by associates of the mambo (such as the sekuru houses and Rozvi), the core around Khami ruled by "Ndumba" (possibly Tumbare), and another zone consisting of Kalanga ruled by moyo chiefs, along with tributaries located further from the capital. David Beach considered the term empire to be a misnomer when applied to the Changamire state as it lacked regular administration throughout its purported territory, instead consisting largely of tributaries whose allegiance fluctuated depending on the state's fortunes.

The population paid tribute (mupeta) to the mambo annually with goods that they produced, which were then redistributed throughout the state, and they also engaged in tribute labour (zhunde). In return, the population received land grants, religious ceremonies believed to bestow rain and fertility, food during drought, Portuguese trade, and protection from foreign and Rozvi armies. As happened in Mutapa, a ceremony occurred annually during which all fires in the state were put out and only relit from a fire the mambo transferred to chiefs, symbolising submission. The custom of kugadza ushe allowed the mambo to approve or install chiefs and headmen, and bestow symbols of office such as a sheathed knife (mucho-mucho) and colourful trailing garment for important chiefs, and a conch whorl crown (chiremba) and staff (tswimbo) for lesser chiefs. Chiefs were given a handful of soil on installation. Loyalty was also fostered by granting land (kuveranyika) to various groups, which was likely also done by chiefs, and this was compounded by the kuronzera system (discussed below).

== Economy ==
The economy was based in agropastoralism, for which there were good environmental conditions, and the region was rich in copper, gold, iron, ivory, salt (in the west), and game. People mainly worked as farmers, though could also engage in hunting, mining, and specialised crafts in their spare time and use the products for trade or tribute. The main crops were finger millet, drought-resistant bulrush millet, and various sorghums. Men typically did construction and the clearing/preparing of lands (necessary when fields became exhausted), while women did the sowing and cultivating, and both participated in harvesting. The Rozvi accumulated large cattle herds throughout the 18th century due to Butua being a cattle-breeding centre, with the kuronzera system (loaning of cattle to clients, wherein they could profit off of the produce but not dispose of the cattle) said to have allowed for the conversion of economic power to political power.

There is little information available about local production and trade in the state. People likely mined gold in their spare time and sent a portion to the mambo as tribute, though by the 19th century most accessible deposits had been exploited down to the water table. According to one source, copper was mined and smelted by all families, though another source stated that smithing was done by specific families who held high status. Iron, copper, and gold were made into tools and jewellery, while luxury objects were also made out of ivory, soapstone, and shells. A cotton cloth called matjira was produced by men (though the industry was not as large as in the lower Zambezi Valley), and matjira dyed black was especially highly valued.

People paid tribute to the mambo with goods they produced, such as tobacco, animal skins and furs, iron tools, livestock, grain, ivory, cloth, beads, and gold. People also engaged in tribute labour (zhunde) for chiefs, which largely involved agricultural work, the produce of which was used to feed the workers, the chiefs' guests, and those with nothing, while also being distributed during famine. Zhunde was likely also used to build chiefs' houses. It is unclear whether zhunde for the mambo took the form of military service, agricultural work, or construction projects such as stone structures (although according to one source the Changamires rarely built stone structures such as zimbabwe, and instead resided in ancient stone ruins). Wives undertook zhunde on their husbands' fields, with the produce saved for emergencies, while men paid brideprice to their parents-in-law with zhunde.

Map of trade centres and routes on the Zimbabwean Plateau

The Rozvi engaged in long-distance trade with the Portuguese via Zumbo (which relied on the Rozvi military for its security, consequently making the Portuguese in the region politically and economically reliant on the mambo), and permitted the presence of a feira in Manyika (the only one on the Plateau). The mambo was paid a very large tax (kuruva) by the Portuguese for permission to trade in the interior. Due to the Portuguese being barred from entering the Rozvi state, this trade was done through travelling merchants (vashambadzi), with the journey there and back taking around a year. One Portuguese source dated to 1750 lamented vashambadzi running off with the trade goods. The Rozvi primarily exported gold and ivory for cloth and beads, but also imported other goods such as Chinese porcelain and muzzleloaders. The mambo was reported to have dictated trade, with all gold required to be sent to him and chiefs that were found to keep some condemned to death, though it is unclear how dominant this monopoly was. There were reports of vashambadzi trading directly with villages, and chiefs had the right to one tusk from every elephant hunted in their territory. The exploitation of most accessible gold deposits meant that the amount of gold exported declined gradually from the mid- to late-18th century, while ivory exports remained high. The Rozvi imported dogs from the Tswana in the west.

== Society and culture ==
Rozvi praise poetry emphasises the importance of cattle in Rozvi identity and status. Mountains were regarded as sacred places, while also serving as defensive fortresses during war. Initiation ceremonies for boys and girls were held individually rather than in groups. Girls were prepared for marriage by a mbonga, an unmarried woman of the chief's patrilineal kin, usually the chief's sister who guarded the clan's charms. At Danamombe there were four artillery cannons that had likely been looted during Dombo's conquests in the late-17th century, and they were reportedly rusted by the 19th century.

The Rozvi population viewed itself as children of Mwari (vana vamwari), the Shona high god. Rainmaking ceremonies were likely initially held at Khami because the Rozvi, as newcomers, did not have strong enough relations with the spirits of the land. Catrien Van Waarden wrote that after the final Torwa mambo failed to bring rain, the Kalanga population likely embraced the closely-related Rozvi religion as a 'better' way to solicit rain. Mediumship among the Kalanga was replaced by mazenge possession, wherein a woman would be possessed by a 'wild lion spirit' and resolve domestic conflict while wearing a mane of imported beads and a special cloth. This subversion of ancestral spirit possession was possibly because the Rozvi mambo could not use the Torwa mhondoro (royal spirits, lit. 'lion spirit'). In the late-18th century, the Mwari cave-cult was introduced to the Rozvi state by migrants from the Venda Kingdom (which merged ordinary worship of Mwari with the Mbedzi's worship of Raluvhimba via cave shrines) during its fragmentation amid civil war. The cult involved a series of cave shrines throughout the Matopos Hills which were maintained by priests and were associated with rainmaking, high crop yields, and local politics among other factors. Priests had representatives from among the local populations who sought to gain adherents to their shrine. The practice rapidly expanded throughout the 19th and 20th centuries.

== Military ==
The Rozvi boasted a large, disciplined, and greatly-feared military which served to project power and maintain their supremacy on the Zimbabwean Plateau. It is unclear whether the Rozvi had a full-time standing army. The military was composed of regiments (missoca), each led by a cabo who answered to a general (inhabeze), who in turn took instructions from Tumbare as the supreme inhabeze. The mambo was the commander-in-chief. The army was accompanied by women who carried supplies, collected water, and cooked for the soldiers, which allowed for longer campaigns. Soldiers also brought some food for themselves, such that the call to arms was "Chisadza mhomwe", meaning "Fill your bags with porridge". Both Rozvi and Kalanga traditions say that the mambo's military was empowered by war drums, which Ngomane (Chief Diviner) accordingly reinvigorated annually using captured children and young men from the mambo's subjects who were made into medicine (a metaphor for recruitment).

In battle, the army were organised into a crescent or bullhorn formation where the main body (viatte) was flanked by two 'horns' (mulomo acumba), with some following behind who saw to the wounded and distributed supplies to prevent a retreat. Soldiers were armed with bows and arrows, spears, shields, battle axes, daggers, and bludgeons. Their main weapons were bows and arrows, though skilled use of hide shields, battle axes, and projectile knobkerries reportedly gave them their fighting advantage (though there is little information available on how the army trained). The Rozvi also had muskets and cannons, though the guns obtained from trade were often faulty and ineffective. Traditions say that Tumbare sounded the war drums after the mambo fired a cannon as part of the call to arms. Accordingly, the drums were carried into battle and they were opened to release sacred bees or worms which stung and killed the enemy. This likely referred to poison arrows, with San arrow poison made from a specific beetle's larvae ('worms'). Other tactics employed by the Rozvi included making fires whose smoke disorientated the enemy and whose embers burnt their feet, while another possible tactic was poisoning the enemy's food and water supply. The military's weakness was that it was poorly prepared and dispositioned to defensive warfare. For the century before the Nguni invasions in the 1830s, there is no evidence of the Rozvi fighting a defensive war, and fortifications at important sites were minimal.

To boost morale and intimidate the enemy, soldiers engaged in war chants involving singing, chanting, ululating, and brandishing spears. The following is a revered chant called Bayawabaya (a yowerere is an idiophone instrument associated with commotion):

Shona

Yowerere! Bayawabaya!
Yowerere! M'kono Unobaya dzose!
Yowerere! Bvunsa wadvunza!
Yowerere! M'kono unobvunza dzose!
Yowerere! Rova warova!
Yowerere! M'kono unorova dzose!
Yowerere! Bayawabaya!
Yowerere! M'kono unobaya dzose!

Translation:
English

Yowerere! Stab the stabber!
Yowerere! The bull that stabs all!
Yowerere! Challenge the challenger!
Yowerere! The bull that challenges all!
Yowerere! Vanquish the vanquisher!
Yowerere! The bull that vanquishes all!
Yowerere! Stab the stabber!
Yowerere! The bull that stabs all!

== List of rulers ==
By the turn of the 20th century, there were still many elderly Rozvi oral historians who recalled the state's final days. Several lists were recorded by European missionaries and colonial officials (see List of rulers of the Rozvi Empire § Regnal lists and genealogies recorded between 1894 and 1906). The lists differed in whether they sought to strengthen the claims of the Mutinhima or Chapungu house to the continuation of the ruling Changamire dynasty. David Beach wrote that the lists generally agreed that there were at least 7 ruling Changamires over the course of around 150 years (supported by Portuguese records), that the Washaya and Mutinhima lineages were related to the founder of the ruling dynasty, and that "Basvi" and "Dyembeu" were inheritable titles.
