= Kingdom of Great Zimbabwe =

Ancient/medieval kingdom in Southern Africa

Kingdom of Great Zimbabwe Zimbabwe
- 13th century–16th/17th century
- Zimbabwe Bird

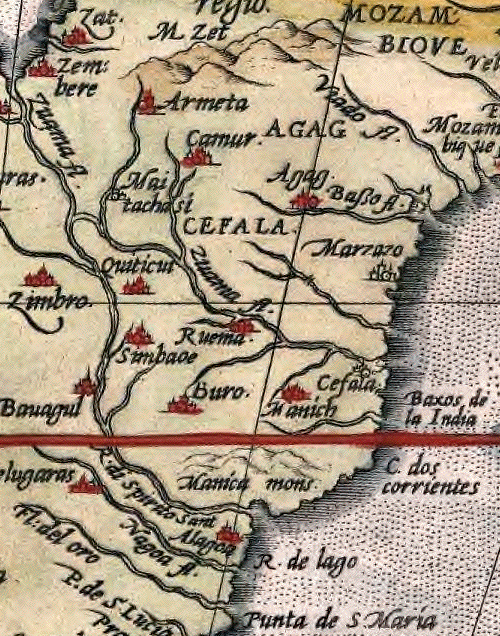
- Great Zimbabwe appears on Abraham Ortelius' 1570 map Africae Tabula Nova, rendered "Simbaoe".
- Capital: Great Zimbabwe
- Religion: Shona traditional religion
- Government: Monarchy
- History
  - Established: 13th century
  - Fall of Mapungubwe, rise of Great Zimbabwe: c. 1300
  - Nyatsimba Mutota leaves to establish the Kingdom of Mutapa: c. 1450
  - Abandonment of Great Zimbabwe: 16th/17th century

Area
  - Total: 50,000 km^{2} (19,000 sq mi)
- ISO 3166 code: ZW
Preceded by	Succeeded by
Gumanye; Kingdom of Mapungubwe	Mutapa Empire; Kingdom of Butua
- Today part of: Zimbabwe, and parts of South Africa, Mozambique, Zambia, and Botswana.

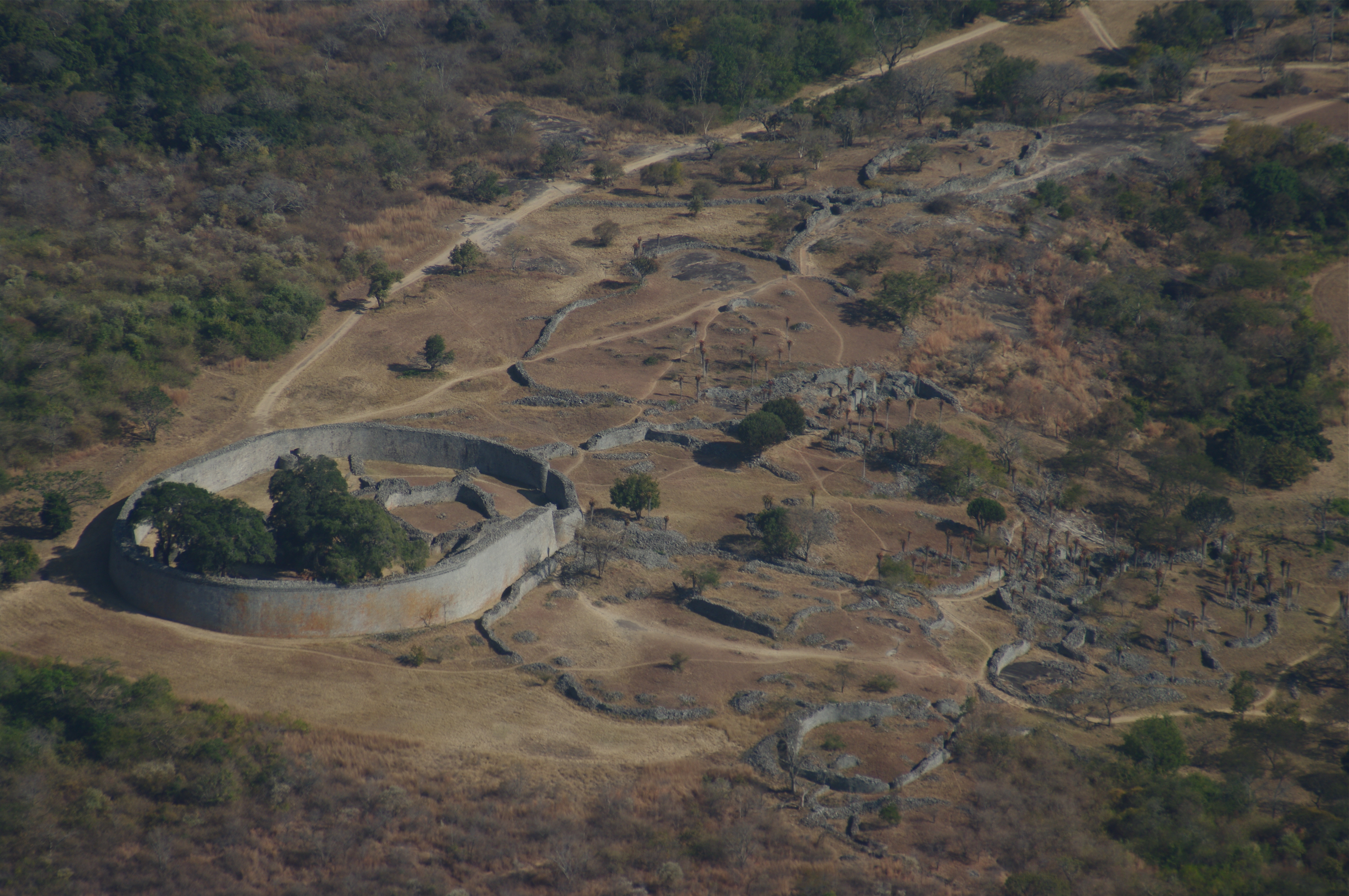
Aerial view of the Great Enclosure and Valley Complex at Great Zimbabwe, looking west

The Kingdom of Great Zimbabwe was a Shona kingdom located in modern-day Zimbabwe. Its capital was Great Zimbabwe, the largest stone structure in precolonial Southern Africa, which had a population of 10,000. Around 1300, Great Zimbabwe replaced Mapungubwe as the most important trading centre in the interior, exporting gold via Swahili city-states into the Indian Ocean trade. At Great Zimbabwe's centre was the Great Enclosure which is thought to have housed royalty and had demarcated spaces for rituals, while commoners surrounded them within the second perimeter wall. The Zimbabwe state was composed of over 150 smaller zimbabwes and likely covered 50,000 km^{2} (19,000 sq mi).

It is unknown what caused Great Zimbabwe's decline and migration of the Shona to other places from the 15th century, however land depletion or a depletion of critical resources, increased regional competition, shifting trade routes, and overpopulation likely played a role. By the 16th century, the Mutapa Empire and the Kingdom of Butua centred on Khami had replaced Great Zimbabwe as the major powers in the region. Great Zimbabwe likely continued to be inhabited into the 17th century, before it was eventually abandoned.

The history of Great Zimbabwe has largely been reconstructed using archaeology; David Beach wrote that oral traditions originating from the site's population did not survive, mostly due to conquests by Shona from the north and west in the 18th century who lacked incentive to maintain them.

== Etymology ==
The Kingdom of Great Zimbabwe derives its name from its capital, Great Zimbabwe. The name "dzimbabwe" is Shona for "great house of stone", from the nouns 'dzimba-' meaning "great house" and 'ibwe' meaning "-stone". "Zimbabwe" derives from Zimba-ra-mabwe or Zimba-re-mabwe, translated from the Karanga dialect of Shona as "houses of stones" (dzimba = augmentative noun of imba, "house"; mabwe = plural of ibwe, "stone"; ra/re = preposition for "of").

== History ==
=== Origins and rise ===
The region had been inhabited by the San dating back over 100,000 years, (Note: Some scholars contest that cultures and identities can't be considered fixed or invariable, especially over such a long time period.) and was inhabited by Bantu-speaking peoples from 150 BC, who from the 4th century AD formed various agricultural chiefdoms. An early settlement and predecessor was Gumanye. The site of what would become Great Zimbabwe had been occupied since 1000 by speakers of proto-Karanga (south-central Shona). (Note: The term Karanga began as an exonym of the Shona used by outsiders, however in the modern day it refers to a dialect of Shona in south-central Zimbabwe.) The settlement lay on the margins of mainstream developments occurring to its south from the 10th century in the Limpopo-Shashe Basin, where states and chiefdoms competed over gold and other goods for the Indian Ocean trade. In the 13th century Great Zimbabwe was on the fringe of the Mapungubwe state.

From the 12th century, Great Zimbabwe wrestled with other settlements, such as Chivowa, for economic and political dominance in the Southern Zambezi Escarpment. Agriculture and cattle played a key role in developing a vital social network, and served to "enfranchise management of goods and services distributed as benefits within traditional political and social institutions", while long distance trade was crucial for the transformation of localised organisations into regional ones. The ruling dynasty used their wealth to make houses out of thick daga (earthen daub), rather than daga and poles, and built stone walls to shield themselves from public view. The aforementioned process advanced rapidly in the 13th century, and saw the construction of large dry-stone walls. By 1250 Great Zimbabwe had become an important trade centre. Gold production increased rapidly during this time. By 1300, trade routes had shifted north as merchants bypassed the Limpopo and Mapungubwe by travelling into the gold-producing interior, precipitating Mapungubwe's rapid decline and the dominance of Great Zimbabwe.

=== Apogee ===
At its peak Great Zimbabwe covered 7.22 km^{2} (2.79 sq mi) and became a centre for industry and political power. At Great Zimbabwe's centre was the Great Enclosure which housed royalty and had demarcated spaces for rituals. Commoners surrounded them within the second perimeter wall, and its population was around 10,000. Great Zimbabwe dominated trade routes despite not directly controlling village-based mining and smelting, and engaged in the Indian Ocean trade via Swahili city-states such as Sofala. Traders travelled the Save and Runde rivers, possibly using locally-produced canoes. The state was composed of over 150 smaller zimbabwes, and likely covered 50,000 km^{2} (19,000 sq mi). Stone structures were built around the north-eastern plateau, likely provincial outposts controlling areas of gold production. The institutionalisation of Great Zimbabwe's politico-religious ideology served to legitimise the position of the king (mambo), with a link between leaders, their ancestors, and God. The community incorporated dhaka pits into a complex water management system.

It is unclear to what extent coercion and conflict played in Great Zimbabwe's growth and dominance due to this being challenging to recognise archaeologically. While the Great Enclosure served to display prestige and status, and to reinforce inequalities between elites and commoners, it likely also served to deter contestation for political power amid the close linkage between wealth accumulation and political authority, with rivals for power, such as district chiefs and regional governors, located outside the settlement in prestige enclosures. The perimeter walls also likely served a defensive purpose, indicating warfare was conventional.

=== Decline ===
Map of trade centres and routes on the Zimbabwean Plateau

It is unknown what caused Great Zimbabwe's demise and its eventual abandonment. (Note: A major factor involves the actions of European antiquarians and prospectors during the colonial period in the looting of the site, destroying its stratigraphy.) It is unclear to what extent climate change played a role, however Great Zimbabwe's location in a favourable rainfall zone makes this unlikely to have been a primary cause. Great Zimbabwe's dominance over the region depended on its continual extension and projection of influence, as its growing population needed more farming land and traders more gold. Shona oral tradition attributes Great Zimbabwe's demise to a salt shortage, which may be a figurative way of speaking of land depletion for agriculturalists or of the depletion of critical resources for the community. It is plausible the aquifer Great Zimbabwe sat on top of ran out of water, or the growing population contaminated the water.

From the early 15th century, international trade began to decline amid a global economic downturn, reducing demand for gold, which adversely affected Great Zimbabwe. Innocent Pikirayi has hypothesised that, in response to this, elites possibly expanded regional trading networks, resulting in greater prosperity for other settlements in the region. By the late 15th century, the consequences of this decision would have begun to manifest, as offshoots from Great Zimbabwe's royal family formed new dynasties, possibly as a result of losing succession disputes. According to Korekore oral tradition, Nyatsimba Mutota, a member of Great Zimbabwe's royal family, led part of the population north in search for salt to found the Mutapa Empire. (Note: According to tradition, the move came about because the king was tired of eating salt made from goat's dung.) It was believed that only their most recent ancestors would follow them, with older ancestors staying at Great Zimbabwe and providing protection there. Angoche traders opened a new route along the Zambezi via Mutapa and Ingombe Ilede to reach the goldfields west of Great Zimbabwe, precipitating its decline and the rise of Khami, the capital of the Kingdom of Butua. By the 16th century, political and economic power had shifted away from Great Zimbabwe to the north and west. The site likely continued to be inhabited into the 17th century, before it was eventually abandoned.

== Government ==
The state had a mambo as its sacred leader, aided by a designated brother or sister, along with an increasingly rigid three-tiered class structure. The kingdom taxed other rulers throughout the region, and was composed of over 150 tributaries headquartered in their own minor zimbabwes.

== Society and culture ==
Great Zimbabwe was likely a centre for crafts and a place of great religious significance, however, unlike at Mapungubwe, rainmaking centres and cults were kept distant from the centre of power, and it was often entrusted to native members of particular regions. There was a mystical relationship between leaders and the land, and a link between leaders, their ancestors, and God. The mambo's first wife held authority over his other wives. Royalty initially lived at the Eastern and Western enclosures, with archaeological research uncovering ritual spears, gongs, and soapstone bird effigies. The public surrounded them until the space became too limited for the growing population and the royalty moved to the Great Enclosure, constructed throughout the 13th and 14th centuries. The Great Enclosure partitioned domestic and public spaces, the latter likely used for rituals. Similar to Venda tradition (who diverged from the Shona in the 17th century), the Great Enclosure could have been used for circumcision rites and served as a pre-marital school for girls and boys, called domba.

Nobles resolved disputes in a private court, while commoners resolved them in public. Common homes were built out of mud on wooden frame structures. Exotic goods found in the kingdom's region acquired local meanings in rituals, aesthetics, and status, such as Persian earthenware bowls and Chinese celadon. Metalworking and iron bloomery were in the domain of men. As the spiritual home of the Mutapa dynasty, in the 16th century the Mutapa king kept some wives at Great Zimbabwe, which served as the site for the masungiro ritual, involving the parents of both wife and husband.

== Economy ==
The Kingdom of Great Zimbabwe had a mosaic political economy which embedded production and circulation to address needs at individual, household, village, district, capital, and state levels within a multidimensional environment dependent on local qualities. This system later incorporated global trade, however imports were relatively minimal, and it was not solely responsible for the region's economic development.

Great Zimbabwe's wealth was derived from cattle rearing, agriculture, and the domination of trade routes from the goldfields of the Zimbabwean Plateau to the Swahili coast. Cattle was important to the elites in the kingdom since their wealth came from the management of cattle. The large cattle herd that supplied the city moved seasonally and was managed by the court. Salt, cattle, grain, and copper were traded as far north as the Kundelungu Plateau in present-day DR Congo. They had extensive regional and long-distance trading networks with central Africa, the Swahili coast, the Persian Gulf, India, and the Far East. Trade routes shifting north from the Save River, which linked Great Zimbabwe to Sofala, to the Zambezi, which linked Khami to Ingombe Ilede, Mutapa, Angoche, and Quelimane, likely contributed to Great Zimbabwe's demise.

== Stone masonry ==
The rulers of the Zimbabwe Kingdom (known as mambo) cultivated and expanded dry-stone masonry traditions that developed across the Zambezi and Limpopo basins and are also evidenced at sites such as Mapungubwe. Skilled builders used locally available granite, which naturally fractures into regular blocks when heated and cooled, to construct terraces, enclosures, platforms, and free-standing walls without mortar. These techniques evolved from earlier Iron Age settlements in the region and reached their highest architectural expression at Great Zimbabwe during the 13th–15th centuries.

Dry-stone structures in the Zimbabwe tradition were built using a combination of coursed granite blocks, careful interlocking, and gravity-based stability. Distinct regional styles emerged, including coursed masonry, polygonal masonry, and chequered or herringbone motifs, which were both decorative and functional. Large walls such as the Great Enclosure and the Hill Complex demonstrate advanced understanding of load distribution, battering angles, and the thermal properties of granite.

Stone-building was closely connected to political authority, ritual landscapes, and long-distance trade. Platforms and walled enclosures served as elite residences, administrative spaces, and ritual areas, while the distribution of stone sites across the plateau reflects patterns of political control and economic networks within the Zimbabwe Kingdom.

Knowledge of dry-stone construction continued in the later capitals of Khami and Danamombe, incorporating new styles such as decorated retaining walls and terraced platforms. However, by the 19th century, the practice had largely declined as political centers shifted and new building materials were adopted. Despite its importance, traditional knowledge of stone masonry was not systematically documented until the late-20th and early-21st centuries. Efforts by researchers, heritage authorities, and universities in Zimbabwe, including the National University of Science and Technology (NUST), the University of Zimbabwe, and Great Zimbabwe University, are now working to record indigenous building techniques and conservation knowledge to support heritage preservation.

== Historiography and the site ==
European antiquarians looted and pillaged Great Zimbabwe and similar structures from the 1890s to 1920s, greatly inhibiting the work of future archaeologists. Mired in racial prejudice, Rhodesians found it inconceivable that the structures could have been built be indigenous Africans, stipulating that archaeological discoveries of Persian bowls and Chinese celadon were the result of pre-Bantu settlement. The colonial government pressured archaeologists to deny that the structure was built by indigenous Africans, and the refutation of various fantastical and dehumanising theories ascribing the construction to Jews, Arabs, Phoenicians, and anyone but the Shona, along with other activities of the antiquarians, dominated the historiography of Great Zimbabwe throughout the 20th century. Its African origin only became consensus by the 1950s.

Although Shona oral traditions concerning the construction of Great Zimbabwe continued into the 20th century, none are thought to have survived in the area surrounding it. In the 1980s, Ken Mufuka was tasked by the nascent Zimbabwean government with writing a national history of Great Zimbabwe as a riposte to colonial historiography, for which he utilised oral sources, publishing Dzimbahwe: Life and Politics in the Golden Age 1100–1500 AD in 1983. (Note: Writing in 2005, he said that the shrine in the Hill Complex was the home of spirit mediums (svikiro) who were tasked with acting as the conscience of the state. Accordingly they also preserved the traditions of the founders, who he says were Chigwagu Rusvingo (the first mambo), Chaminuka, Chimurenga, Tovera, and Soro-rezhou among others (see mhondoro).) Mufuka's methodology was strongly criticised by Peter Garlake among others for its purported use of creative license and over-reliance on mythology. In the late-20th century, Thomas Huffman used oral sources near the site, Venda and Shona anthropology, and cognitive archaeology in his reconstruction of Great Zimbabwe's history. David Beach criticised his work, and wrote that oral traditions from the original site's population did not survive, largely due to conquests of the entire region by Shona from the north and west in the 18th century who lacked incentive to maintain or incorporate them. Several scholars commented in support of Beach's critique, however Innocent Pikirayi tentatively considered it possible that original traditions were "grafted" onto later ones.

Local narratives, despite each clan claiming the site of Great Zimbabwe, are very similar in lamenting both the European antiquarians and the professional archaeologists for desecrating and appropriating a sacred site. They hold the government responsible for the "silence" and "closure" of Great Zimbabwe due to their refusal to "acknowledge the ownership and control of the site by the ancestors and Mwari".

== See also ==
- Kingdom of Butua
- Kingdom of Mutapa
- Khami
- Danan'ombe

== Sources ==
- Böhmer-Bauer, Kunigunde (2000). Great Zimbabwe: eine ethnologische Untersuchung. R. Köppe. ISBN 389645210X.
- Oliver, Roland & Anthony Atmore (1975). Medieval Africa 1250–1800. Cambridge: Cambridge University Press. pp. 738. ISBN 0-521-20413-5.
- Owomoyela, Oyekan (2002). Culture and Customs of Zimbabwe. Westport: Greenwood. ISBN 978-0-313-31583-1.
- Stewart, John (1989). African States and Rulers. Jefferson: McFarland. pp. 395. ISBN 0-89950-390-X.
- Wieschhoff, H. A. (2006). The Zimbabwe-Monomotapa Culture in Southeast Africa. Whitefish: Kessinger. p. 116. ISBN 1-4286-5488-7.
