= List of rulers of the Rozvi Empire =

Several regnal lists of the Rozvi Empire were recorded in the 1890s and 1900s. Early written histories (and oral traditions to a lesser extent) were heavily influenced by disputes between the empire's former royal houses over its legacy and their prominence in the colonial and postcolonial states.

== Regnal lists and genealogies recorded between 1894 and 1906 ==
By the turn of the 20th century, there were still many elderly Rozvi oral historians who recalled the state's final days. Several lists were recorded by European missionaries and colonial officials, which have been invaluable in documenting Rozvi history. The lists differ in whether they seek to strengthen the claims of the Mutinhima or Chapungu house to the continuation of the ruling Changamire dynasty. In addition to these lists, S. N. G. Jackson wrote in 1898 that Chirisamhuru was the last Rozvi mambo (ruler), T. M. Thomas wrote in 1906 that the first mambo had five brothers (including Washaya, Mutinhima, and Basvi), and R. Lanning wrote in 1906 that the mambo had 9 sons (including Mutinhima, Chikore, Chibamubamu, and Basvi). David Beach wrote that the lists generally agreed that there were at least 7 ruling Changamires over the course of around 150 years (supported by Portuguese records), that the Washaya and Mutinhima lineages were related to the founder of the ruling dynasty, and that "Basvi" and "Dyembeu" were inheritable titles.

=== W. A. Elliot 1894 ===
The following list was recorded by W. A. Elliott in Among the Matabele (1894):

Nechapingura (1st)
Chagadzike
Chamedzi
Gumboremvura
Chapungu (last)
|
(son)
|
(grandson)

=== J. W. Posselt 1904 ===
The following list was recorded by J. W. Posselt from Chingombe (who was recognised as Mambo by several Rozvi groups):

Dombo (1st)
|
——————————
| |
Nechasike Nechagadzike
Rupandamanhanga 'Rupengo'
Gumboremvura
Dyembewu
Chirisamhuru (last)

=== F. G. Elliott 1906 ===
The following list was recorded by F. G. Elliott in Selukwe:

Dombolakonachingwangu (1st)
Mupengo
Nechagadzike
|
——————————
| |
Dyembewu Chibamubamu Mutinhima
| |
Chikore Jiri
|
Zengeya

=== C. T. Stuart 1906 ===
The following list was recorded by C. T. Stuart from 10 informants aged between 60 and 79:

'Mambo' Dyembeu Chibamubamu
Dombolakonachingwangu
|
——————————
| |
Mutinhima Basvi

== Early Rozvi historiography ==
The first literate Rozvi historian was Aron Marwodzi, the Rozvi chief of Bikita (recognised as such by the colonial government) and grandson of a house head of Jiri (originating from the Mutinhima house). In 1893, still relatively young, he left Bikita for work and later joined Wesleyan Methodists. Marwodzi attended night school in Salisbury (now Harare) while working for them, and in 1904 started at the Nenguwo Training Institution (a mission school near Marondera that was attended by several young men associated with ruling dynasties). Marwodzi wrote a history of the Rozvi, which was translated and published by a colonial official in the Native Affairs Department Annual (NADA) as "The Barozwi" in 1924. Another early Rozvi historian was M. V. J. Rukara who was prominent during the 1940s and '50s. He belonged to the Gumunyu house (partially-descended from Tohwechipi), which had been sidelined in Bikita by the Jiri house, and his history denigrated both the Jiri and Washaya houses. He taught and studied at Dutch Reformed schools, including in Transvaal where he visited Venda rulers Mphephu and Tshivhase, learning about their traditions and the recently-excavated Mapungubwe. Rukara began writing his history sometime before 1950, and it was eventually published in the 1960s.
