= Kingdom of Butua =

Kingdom in present-day Zimbabwe (c. 1450–c. 1683)

Kingdom of Butua Butua
- c. 1425–c. 1683
- Capital: Khami
- Common languages: iKalanga
- Religion: Kalanga traditional religion
- Government: Monarchy
- Mambo
  - c. 1425–?: Madabhale
  - ?–c. 1683: Madhladhla
- History
  - Established: c. 1425
  - Conquest by Rozwi Empire: c. 1683
| Preceded by | Succeeded by |
| Leopard's Kopje; Kingdom of Great Zimbabwe | Rozvi Empire |

The Kingdom of Butua or Butwa (c. 1425 – c. 1683) was a Kalanga (western Shona) state located in what is now southwestern Zimbabwe. Butua was renowned as the source of gold for Arab and Portuguese traders. The first written record of the kingdom came from Ahmad ibn Majid in 1502.

Following the opening of a trade route along the Zambezi which bypassed Great Zimbabwe in the early-15th century, the Torwa dynasty at Khami near the goldfields rose to become a major power on the Zimbabwean Plateau, alongside Mutapa. In the 1490s, the Torwa supported a usurper (likely a relative) in Mutapa. In the 1640s, civil war erupted between the mambo (king) and his brother, who was supported by the Mwenye; the mambo was exiled, but returned to power with assistance from a Portuguese prazo-holder. Around 1683, the kingdom was conquered by Changamire Dombo, who founded the Rozvi Empire.

== History ==
Map of trade centres and routes on the Zimbabwean Plateau

=== Foundation and apogee ===
Khami (Note: Khami may derive from the Kalanga word nkami, meaning "milker", alluding to the importance of cattle.) was originally a Leopard's Kopje site, whose inhabitants are thought to be the ancestors of the Kalanga (western Shona). During the time of Great Zimbabwe's dominance over the region, various offshoots split from it to form various states, one such state being the Mutapa Empire. (Note: Oral traditions say that Mutapa's founder, Nyatsimba Mutota, migrated north from Great Zimbabwe, however there isn't any evidence for the same being true of Khami and Butua.) In the early-15th century Angoche traders opened a new route along the Zambezi via the nascent Mutapa Empire and Ingombe Ilede to reach the goldfields west of Great Zimbabwe, bypassing it. Close to the goldfields, a local Leopard's Kopje chiefdom centred on Khami rose to prominence, contributing to Great Zimbabwe's decline. This was the Kingdom of Butua, with its first mambo (king) Madabhale of the Torwa dynasty, (Note: Torwa means "stranger" or "foreigner"; it is unclear whether it was a title for the dynasty or not.) who had the praise name Chibundule (meaning "sounding of the war horn"). Kalanga oral traditions collected in 1922 compress the history of the Torwa dynasty into that of one ruler called Chibundule, such that the story of Chibundule represents that of Butua. (Note: In a praise poem, Chibundule is said to have given refuge to the elephant (the totem of the Mutapa dynasty) and the rhinoceros (possibly the totem of Mapungubwe's dynasty due to the Golden Rhinoceros of Mapungubwe).) (Note: Traditions of the Valoyi (a Tsonga sub-group that descend from the Kalanga) report the first ruler of Butua as the legendary Dlembeu, corroborated by some Shona and Venda traditions.)

Jannie Loubser writes that some Butua chiefs and headmen likely moved south of the Limpopo River to exploit gold, copper, and ivory reserves there. Butua rapidly grew in size and wealth, and came to border the Mutapa Empire along the Sanyati River. (Note: Portuguese records from 1520 state that Butua was a vassal of Mwenemutapa, however this is likely to have been falsified in order to portray Portuguese commercial dealings with Mutapa as more important than they were.) There appear to have been intermarriages between the Torwa dynasty and the Nembire dynasty of Mutapa. Changamire I, who rebelled against and ruled Mutapa from 1490–1494, was likely a member of both dynasties, and was possibly supported by the Torwa. In 1493, the mambo gifted the Mwenemutapa (Mutapa king) 4000 cows and copious amounts of gold. After Mwenemutapa Chikuyo killed Changamire I and regained the kingship, the Torwa allied the successor, Changamire II, and warred against Mutapa until at least 1512. (Note: According to João Velho's 1547 letter, a Muslim trader, supported by the Portuguese, led a campaign to expel a "Changamira" from the lands around the "River of Sofala" (either the Buzi or Pungwe river), and supplanted his rule there by conquest, distributing gifts, and encouraging his subjects to revolt. Several scholars considered this to have been the final defeat of the Changamires, though Stan Mudenge wrote that "Changamira" referred to the Sachiteve (either Nyamunda or his successor Chipute) as a continuation of Nyamunda's wars in the territory.) The first written record of Butua came from Ahmad ibn Majid in 1502, who mentioned "Munhu Butua" ("King of Butua"). Due to tales such as that already mentioned, the Portuguese referred to Butua as the "Mother of Gold". The Portuguese traded far into the interior via African merchants, who were noted for their honesty. The Kalanga of Butua were reportedly not war-like (said to rely more on faith in Mwari), and the mambo only mobilised his army in times of war. Women accompanied the army and cooked for them.

=== Civil war and Portuguese invasion ===
In the 1640s, a dispute between the mambo and his brother escalated. The brother had married into a powerful family of Shona-speaking Muslim traders (called Mwenye), and with the Mwenye's support he forced the mambo into exile in Manyika. With the support of a Portuguese prazo-holder and his army, the mambo returned in 1644 and was reinstated. The prazo-holder left soldiers behind in the capital, however he was killed on the way to Manyika, after which the soldiers withdrew. Historian Malyin Newitt writes that Butua was too remote for Portuguese influence to last, however the episode bolstered Portuguese confidence that they could expand into the interior and conquer Mutapa. The Hill Complex at Khami was likely destroyed and abandoned during the conflict, with the palace showing signs of a fire. Catrien Van Waarden said that there is some evidence that after a ruler died, their buildings were destroyed and rebuilt, and abandoned houses may have been ritualistically burnt.

=== Rozvi conquest ===
Around 1683 Butua was conquered by Changamire Dombo, who is thought to have either been head of the Mwenemutapa's royal cattle herd, which he used to gain influence, or the leader of Mutapa's army, dispatched to Rozvi (Note: Derived from the verb kurozva, meaning "to destroy".) territory (the northeast) where he became leader of the Rozvi and rebelled. In the northeast, a European-introduced epidemic and famine had swept through the region, and there was likely anger about the Mwenemutapa selling gold-producing land to the Portuguese as prazos, dispossessing Karanga families. The Portuguese also dealt directly with chiefs' subjects, disrupting the hierarchical system, with this all propelling Rozvi out-migration. The Portuguese's withdrawal from Butua had likely left the Torwa mambo with little support, possibly compounded by his failure to bring rain amid a drought.

Rozvi traditions say that in Butua there were two rulers, Chibundule and Tumbare of the soko (monkey/baboon) and bepe (calabash) totems respectively, who both lived on hills (symbolising power and royalty), and that Dombo built his own hill taller than theirs. Kalanga (Butua) traditions say that Dombo was only able to defeat Chibundule (represented as having supernatural powers) by giving Chibundule his daughter/sister in marriage who cut his braids (worn like a horn on the fontanelle, symbolising power). Gifting a relative as a wife was often an act of submission. (Note: One account said that Dombo initially paid tribute to Butua.) Chibundule is then said to have been defeated in battle, before fleeing to the Matombo a Bhuba mountains where he disappeared. Kalanga traditions also mention Tumbare, but only as a Chief Councillor of Dombo, though they do detail how Tumbare's father attempted to take power three times (the third involving Chibundule's marriage). Van Waarden said that, along with the possible relations from Changamire I, Dombo's mother may have been Torwa as her lineage is said to have had the soko totem. She also said that factionalism in Butua likely allowed Dombo to support Tumbare to the Butua kingship, before "pushing him aside". Certainly by his death in 1696, Changamire controlled all of Butua's territory. Changamire founded the Rozvi Empire with its capital at Danamombe, and used Butua as his base for his military campaigns.Some of the original inhabitants of Butua (now called the Lilima, a Kalanga sub-group) migrated into north-eastern Botswana.

== Government ==
The mambo belonged to the Torwa dynasty, and had various Councillors (bakadzaxa or makulukota, one of which was head of the royal cattle herds), minor councillors (basungwaxa), and royal advisors (machinda). He also had a Great Diviner (ng'anga), one of their tasks was rainmaking. Roles were likely hereditary. The mambo had multiple residences for security reasons, with oral traditions mentioning five in and around the Matopos Hills. Cattle played an important role in politics, and the mambo owned many. The government's tribute was collected by sub-chiefs from their people, and gifts were likely distributed, often in the form of loans of cattle. The mambo and his chiefs served as judges at court (khuta), and likely held regular meetings with councillors and elders, while also at times addressing the public. The mambo's wives linked him with other lineages and clans, and were often given by subordinate chiefs. The state was likely composed of around 14 bushe (chiefdoms/provinces), each around 100 km (62 mi) in diameter and led by a senior/royal chief who lived in a walled palace (muzinda) and had several wives. These were likely composed of districts, divided into wards (mithuthu) which grouped together settlements. The mambo and his chiefs lived on hills in full view of their subjects, who were on lower ground. Stonewalling symbolised prestige, and was used to demarcate royal and chiefly residences (whose thick dhaka (earthen) walls were decorated) while also creating a level platform for them. Zhunde (tribute labour) was likely used to build stone walls.

The mambo's mhondoro (lit. 'lion spirit', royal ancestral spirits) were believed to act as guardians of the country and be able to influence Mwali (the high god) regarding rainmaking, fertility, and harvests. As their living representative, the mambo likely led the ceremonies, and, communicating through either a medium or diviner, they also chose successors to the kingship. Commoners gave the elite goods such as grain, gold, and copper, in exchange for distribution of cattle and foreign goods, security and good governance, as well as rain and fertility through religious ceremonies. According to Rozvi traditions the Torwa dynasty had the totem of the monkey/baboon (soko). Traditions collected in 1922 claim the kingdom covered the territory from Great Zimbabwe to the Makgadikgadi Pan, south to the Crocodile River, and north to the Zambezi, however other traditions say the mambo ruled from Gweru to the Motloutse River.

== Society and culture ==
People often lived in small villages (nzi), each comprising an extended family (some lineages may have been spread across multiple villages). The extended family was headed by the nsholo we nzi (also potentially the lineage head, ntungamili), and was composed of nuclear families and polygamous families, with the latter living in homesteads (nzana). Homesteads were headed by the husband (nlume) or family head (nsholo e nsha), and consisted of houses (dzing'umba), a courtyard (lubazhe), kraal (danga), granaries (matula), and its lands (minda). Houses were built out of dhaka (earthen daub) and poles, with men doing the woodwork and women the dhaka and thatch, and were located in between male and female areas associated with their respective activities. Men typically ate their evening meal at a meeting place (libazhe), while women and children ate in the kitchen. Catrien Van Waarden wrote that nuclear families may have developed into polygamous ones, and then into extended families, from which nuclear families could split off by themselves. Butua's society was patrilineal and patrilocal.

Scholars such as Thomas Huffman and Innocent Pikirayi have argued that Khami's society was hierarchical, however Chirikure et al. say that it was heterarchical and without hierarchical control over production, wherein class and status were dynamic and based on local contexts. Men sought to marry many wives and have as many children as possible. Produce, skins, and copper could be used to buy cattle and goats, which could then be used to acquire wives. Women sewed skins and furs into blankets, and copper was mined to make jewellery. Gold was mined in people's spare time, usually before planting season. Having a large amount of cattle symbolised high status, and were sought after in order to enlarge one's family. Domestic animals were generally not eaten, instead being used for brideprice, ritual sacrifice, or as a medium of exchange; meat was instead gained through hunting, and was paired with sorghum porridge for meals. An animal having been hunted or sacrificed produced a lot of meat to eat or dry, which was shared among the people, reinforcing relationships or statuses and paying or creating debts. Jewellery was made from gold, bronze, copper, and iron, and was likely common. Prestigious pottery found in the homes of Khami's ruling class was likely used to keep beer in.

Khami features monumental stone structures, which likely symbolised prestige, with reports that the stones were brought to Khami and laboured on as tribute (a service called zhunde). Khami consisted of 30,000 m^{2} (320,000 sq ft) of walled elite platforms, with the largest being the mambo's. Khami's royal palace resembles Leopard's Kopje architecture (specifically Woolandale). At the centre of Khami was the Hill Complex. Terraced stone walls were decorated and formed platforms upon which earthen (dhaka) houses were built. Pikirayi has suggested that the existence of many of these platforms may be explained by Shona succession practices wherein successor kings continued to reside in their home, which became the capital's centre, rather than move to their predecessor's abode, although the prestige of the Hill Complex suggests some kings may have moved there and elites may have made their own platforms. Chirikure et al. have argued that the platforms were centres for familial lineages, supported by the platforms being as far as 3 km (1.9 mi) from Khami's centre. They also say that nhimbe (Shona communal work) could have contributed to their construction. There are many other sites featuring stone structures, such as Chamabvefva, which has been dated to 16th century.

=== Religion ===
Catrien Van Waarden considered it unlikely that Mwali (the Shona high god) was worshipped directly in Butua, as the high god reportedly did not engage with people's personal lives, but could cause natural disasters such as thunderstorms and drought if angered. People instead likely worshipped their vadzimu (ancestral spirits), and venerated the mambo's mhondoro (lit. 'lion spirit', royal spirits) who concerned themselves with the nation's welfare (while commoners' vadzimu operated at the familial level) and were believed to be able to persuade the high god to make rain. Van Waarden wrote that spirits were likely voiced by mediums (svikiro), contrary to Kalanga religion in the present day wherein Mwali is also worshipped directly. She said that these changes may have been caused by the final Torwa mambo's failure to bring rain, causing the population to embrace the variations in Rozvi religion as a 'better' way to solicit rain. She also wrote that the later replacement of mediumship may have been caused by Rozvi mambos not being able to use Torwa mhondoro. In Butua, Torwa mhondoro were offered sacrifices (possibly black cattle, beer, or grain) at a shumba nlume (lit. 'male lion') shrine, and either communicated through a medium (who came from outside the mambo's patrilineal family) or a diviner (ng'anga, who used divining dice (dzi-akata)). Traditions mention "Hambani" as Chibundule's Great Diviner (ng'anga wulu), and such a position would have involved consultation about important decisions, while also providing the mambo's charms.

== Economy ==
Butua's economy was based in agropastoralism. Sorghum and finger millet were favoured as crops due to low rainfall. Cattle were abundant in Butua, and were a large source of its wealth. Cattle were also likely used for loans (a practice called kusaidza). The person who received the loan (kuronzera) could use the cattle as they saw fit and sell its produce, however they could not dispose of them without the owner's permission. The relationship between owner and kuronzera resembled one of vassalage, and served to distribute food and wealth, with the mambo owning most cattle. Despite Butua's fame for gold, Portuguese reports claimed that its people had little interest in gold mining, and focussed primarily on cattle.

Butua benefited from controlling the gold trade to its southwest, and in the kingdom gold, copper, tin, and iron were mined. Chirikure et al. have suggested that production was controlled at the household level. Smelting and tool manufacturing were also undertaken, along with cotton spinning (practised throughout society), weaving, and hunting. Those hunted included wildebeest, buffalo, impala, sable antelope, kudu, and hartebeest, as well as elephants for ivory, and people also fished. Pottery was made by women, while jewellery and ornaments were also commonly produced. Gold, ivory, and animal skins were exported into the Indian Ocean trade, while glass beads, porcelain, and silver were imported.

== Gallery ==
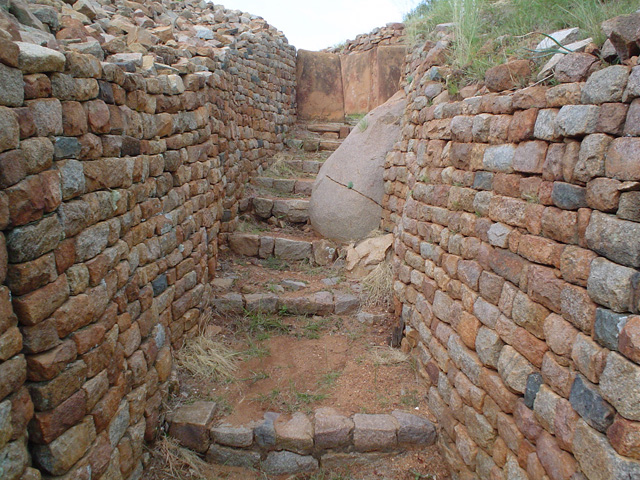
The ruins of Khami, capital of the Butua Kingdom.

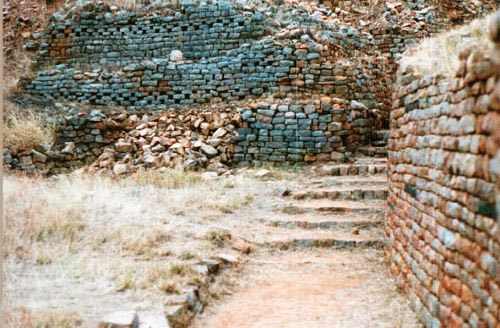
Steps leading into the ancient city of Khami

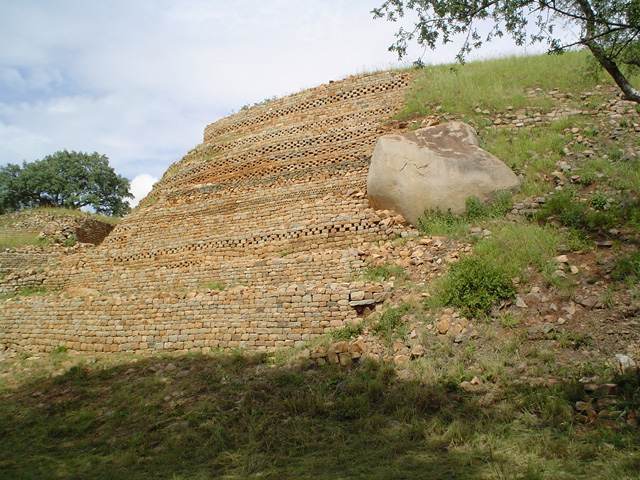

== See also ==
- Rozwi Empire
- Naletale
