= Nyamazana =

Ngoni warrior-queen

Nyamazana was an Ngoni warrior-queen during the Mfecane in the mid-19th century. In 1835, she led an attack on the capital of the Rozvi Empire in present-day Zimbabwe, which precipitated the demise of the Rozvi state.

== Biography ==
Nyamazana was a relative (a niece or cousin) of Zwangendaba, who had led the Ngoni on a long-distance migration northwards since the defeat of Zwide's Ndwandwe (of whom Zwangendaba was an Induna) to Shaka's Zulu c. 1819. In 1835 Zwangendaba and his people crossed the Zambezi, while Nyamazana remained on the Zimbabwean Plateau with some Ngoni. One tradition says that Zwangendaba refused to allow her to follow him (possibly due to logistics).

That same year Nyamazana and her forces attacked the embattled Rozvi Empire, which in the years prior had managed to fend off several invasions by Nguni groups, including Zwangendaba's. Nyamazana lost the first battle against the Rozvi, but led an attack on Danamombe (the Rozvi capital) which forced the Rozvi ruler, Chirisamhuru, to flee, with her forces killing him either at Manyanga or on the way there. This spelled the end of the Rozvi state, which lay headless with leadership fragmented between houses, many of which voluntarily submitted to Mzilikazi's Ndebele c. 1839–1840.

Nyamazana, who up until then had continued raiding the Shona, surrendered to Mzilikazi while her forces either assimilated into the Ndebele or migrated away. She also married Mzilikazi, coming to be one of his favourite wives. There is little information available on Nyamazana's life. Ryan Rasmussen wrote that she likely died in the early 1900s.

Zwangendaba or Mzilikazi are often miscredited with the defeat of Chirisamhuru.
