= Guruuswa =

Historical region in Zimbabwe

Guruuswa or Guruhuswa (Note: Also Gunuvutwa or Gunuuswa.) is a term used for a historical region in modern-day Zimbabwe. Meaning "long grass" in Shona, David Beach considered it to be an environmental term due to its location differing among informants. The Historical Dictionary of Zimbabwe says that Guruuswa was a region corresponding to southwestern Zimbabwe that was home to the Kingdom of Butua and, later, the Rozvi Empire. Other sources say it was the southern province or portion of the Mutapa Empire.

Shona oral traditions hold that they originated from Guruuswa.
