= Mavangwe Hills =

Range of hills in Zimbabwe

- Location within Zimbabwe

Highest point
- Elevation: 1,200 m (3,900 ft)
- Coordinates: 19.16793°S 31.86744°E

Geography
- Location: Zimbabwe

The Mavangwe Hills are a range of hills in northern Buhera District, Manicaland Province in Zimbabwe.

They are the location of the grave of Tohwechipi, son of the last king of the Rozvi Empire. The site is a sacred national monument, and was declared a protected forest area in 2024.
