= Mwari =

Supreme deity in the traditional religion of Shona people

Mwari (Note: Also known as Mwali, Musikavanhu, Musikavhathu, Musiki, Tenzi, Nwali, Raluvhimba, or Ishe.) is the supreme creator deity according to Shona and Venda traditional religion. It is believed that Mwari is the author of all things and all life and all is in him. The majority of this deity's followers are concentrated in Mozambique, South Africa, and Zimbabwe. Mwari (Mwali) is an omnipotent being, who rules over spirits and is the Supreme God of the religion.

The same deity is applied and also referred to as Inkhosi in Northern and Southern Ndebele traditional religion. Mwari's reverence dates back to the age of the ancient king Monomotapa, of the Mutapa Kingdom on the Zambezi River.

== Etymology ==
The name "Mwari" in Shona means the force behind Creation. The word itself signifies, resembles and is interpreted as "God", but only in the religious context. The furthering of this term's acceptance is when the Christian missionaries interpreted the Bible for the locals, in which they used the term "Mwari" instead of "God".

== History ==
The first official recognition of Mwari was by the Kingdom of Zimbabwe, whose most notable ruler was Monomotapa of the Kingdom of Mutapa. It is believed that this new addition to Shona religion was incorporated into Great Zimbabwe. Mwari was frequently approached via mediums at shrines at Matonjeni in the Matopo Hills of Zimbabwe.

In 1890, Christian missionaries began to translate the Bible into Shona. They translated the name for the biblical God as Mwari. Dora Rudo Mbuwayesango calls this 'in reality a religious usurpation of the Shona. ... The depictions of God in Shona oral traditions were designated as primitive and uncivilized, and so the biblical depiction of God was elevated as the civilized and authentic way of talking about the Shona deity, Mwari'.

== Characteristics ==
Mwari is seen as a kind and loving God. Mwari is not only the God of creation, but also of land fertility and blessing rains. Mwari is the one who controls the forces of Earth, from the fortune of journeys to social and political events. Though the Shona and the Ndebele often pray to Mwari alone, it is also very common for the use of spirit mediums to be employed.

Although missionary Bible translations transcribed Mwari as male, the Shona understood Mwari as not having a gender (or neither male and female).

== Oral history concerning Mwari ==
It was a belief amongst the Shona people that no one had the right or authority to call unto Mwari directly without observing the protocol of airing out grievances or thanksgiving supplications to the deity through spirit mediums (who were possessed by ancestral and other spirits). In northern Zimbabwe, Mwari was contacted through spirit mediums or spirits; in other parts of Zimbabwe, he spoke to the people via an oracle.

It was also believed that anyone who defied this spiritual law would develop leprosy as the name of the ineffable and unknowable God was believed to be holy and beyond everything.
