= Prazo =

Large leased estate in Portuguese colonial Africa

A prazo (or prazo da coroa) in Portuguese Africa was a large estate leased to colonists, settlers and traders to exploit the continent's resources. Prazos operated like semi-feudal entities and were most commonly established in the Zambezi River valley.

== Definition ==
The prazo was a land grant/lease given in exchange for an annual fixed fee based on laws promulgated by Portuguese kings, such as Afonso V and Manuel I.

== History ==
The existence of the prazos as an institution has been known since the 16th century, but the terms prazo and prazeiro ("prazo owner") only appear in sources from the 18th century onwards, with the estate and their owner before then being called foro and foreiro, respectively.

The leaseholder was required to live on the granted land and could not sell or rent it, although lessees frequently violated that rule. In Tete Province during the 19th century, 32 prazeiros owned 57 prazos. The land grant was not supposed to exceed 500 leagues in length, although most did. In 1677 a system was adopted to attract Portuguese settlers. Vacant prazos were to be granted to "deserving orphan girls or the daughters of crown servants", who would pass the prazo on to her eldest daughter for three generations who married to Portuguese men. At that time the government could retake control or renew the lease.

The prazeiro was allowed to employ Africans (colonos); to raise a private army (often made up of slaves); trade in all commodities; and maintain law and order. The Portuguese Crown intended the prazo to guarantee control over the land, stimulate agricultural production, facilitate European settlement, and be a source of revenue for the government, but the system failed in the objectives. Contributions to the failure were rampant absenteeism, violent rivalries between the grantees, the scarcity of Portuguese women, lack of capital, and Africans, of which the latter cause was probably the most important. The prazo system's concepts of female inheritance, three lives, and individual landownership were alien to African traditions. In the 19th century, Portugal often failed to maintain centralized control over the prazos, which shifted between a loyal and a dissident stance towards the Portuguese Crown. For example, one Mozambican prazo was transformed into the anti-Portuguese Macanga Kingdom under the ruler Choutama (Pedro Caetano Pereira) and his son and successor Chissaka.

The government failed in an attempt to reform the system in the mid-19th century. Another attempt was made in the 1890s without result, but the introduction of the concessionaire companies about that time, the 1890 British Ultimatum and the Portuguese Colonial Act of 1930 contributed to the end of the prazo.

== Sources ==
- Azevedo, Mario; Nnadozie, Emmanuel & Mbuia, Tomé (2003). Historical Dictionary of Mozambique (2nd ed.). Lanham, Maryland: Scarecrow Press. ISBN 0-8108-3792-7.
- Eckert, Andreas; Grau, Ingeborg & Sonderegger, Arno (2010). Afrika 1500-1900: Geschichte und Gesellschaft. Vienna: Promedia. ISBN 978-3-8537-1303-7.
- Newitt, Malyn D. D. "The Portuguese on the Zambezi: An Historical Interpretation of the Prazo System". The Journal of African History 10, 1 (1969): 67–85.
