= Mambo (title) =

Shona title

Mambo (pl. Madzimambo) is a Bantu title roughly equivalent to "king" or "emperor". It is most closely associated with the precolonial Shona states, such as the Rozvi and Mutapa empires. Madzimambo often also fulfilled religious duties as sacred kings. In the Mutapa Empire, chiefs subordinate to the emperor sometimes desired to be referred to as madzimambo, though the title was reserved for the emperor. In the Maravi Empire, mambo became a title for junior leaders.

Nowadays, in Shona mambo is sometimes used as a respectful form of address.
