= David Beach (historian) =

Zimbabwean historian

David Norman Beach
- Born: 28 June 1943; Midlands, England, UK
- Died: 15 February 1999 (aged 55); Harare, Zimbabwe
- Citizenship: Zimbabwe
- Education: University of Cape Town
- Known for: Precolonial history of the Mashona
- Scientific career
- Fields: History of Zimbabwe; Oral history
- Workplaces: University of Cape Town; University of Zimbabwe

David Norman Beach (28 June 1943 – 15 February 1999) was a Zimbabwean historian. He worked at the Ministry of Internal Affairs, and the University of Zimbabwe and pioneered the documentation of oral traditions in Zimbabwe. In his work on Great Zimbabwe, Beach has promoted the interpretation of the different complexes as dwellings of successive rulers, opposing the structuralist tradition favoured by historians such as Huffman. When Zimbabwe became independent in 1980, Beach took up Zimbabwean citizenship. When asked about his work, Nolan Chipo Makombe said "he is a comrade." In 1983 when an interviewer from London referred to David Beach as British while interviewing Charles Utete, Utete responded dramatically saying "He (Beach) belongs to us, he does not belong to you. He is a Zimbabwean, period." Utete went on to say "He is not British, he is not Rhodesian, he is Zimbabwean. He is a comrade."
