= Zimbabwean plateau =

The Zimbabwean Plateau is a plateau in Southern Africa. It is bounded by the Middle and Lower Zambezi Valley in the north, the Kalahari desert in the west, the Limpopo Valley to the south, and declines in the east towards the East African coast and Indian Ocean. It generally has an elevation of over 1,000 m (3,300 ft). The Plateau largely consists of savanna-woodland with musasa and munondo trees on higher ground, and mufuti and munondo on lower ground. Several rivers traverse the Plateau, including the Save, Pungwe, and Runde.

== See also ==
- Geography of Zimbabwe
- Eastern Highlands
