= Nkange (Botswana constituency) =

Parliamentary constituency in the Central District of Botswana, 1965 onwards

- Single-member constituency for the National Assembly
- District: Central District
- Population: 55,418
- Major settlements: Nkange
- Area: 4,558km^{2}

Current constituency
- Created: 1965
- Party: BCP
- MP: Motlhaleemang Moalosi
- Margin of victory: 2,634 (12.2 pp)

Nkange is a constituency in the Central District represented in the National Assembly of Botswana by Motlhaleemang Moalosi a Botswana Congress Party (BCP) MP since 2024.

== Constituency profile ==
Situated in the northeast of the Central District of Botswana, the Nkange constituency was established in 1965 for the country's inaugural elections and is one of Botswana's longest extant constituencies.

The constituency was historically a Botswana Democratic Party (BDP) stronghold. From 1965 to 2014, the BDP consistently garnered an average of 63% of the vote, with its predominance being strongly challenged by the Botswana Progressive Union in 1984, 1989 and 1994. Since the turn of the century, the BDP's decline continued to wane.

In 2019, echoing a broader trend within the district, a significant political realignment occurred in the country as Ian Khama, paramount chief of the Ngwato tribe fell out with the incumbent president, Mokgweetsi Masisi and leader of the BDP. This political discord had some impact on the constituency's voting patterns, though not as much as the more Ngwato-populated constituencies such as Shoshong but was nevertheless enough to flip the constituency to the Umbrella for Democratic Change. It was the first time an opposition party won Nkange. The UDC lost the seat to the BCP the seat in 2024, making it one of only two constituencies that did not return a sitting UDC MP that election; the other being Selebi-Phikwe West. This was due to Motlhaleemang Moalosi running an intensive campaign there.

The constituency, predominantly rural, encompasses the following villages:

1. Maitengwe
2. Nkange
3. Senete
4. Changate
5. Dagwi
6. Matobo
7. Nswazwi
8. Makuta
9. Nshakashogwe
10. Marapong
11. Sebina
12. Marobela
13. Semitwe
14. Mafhungo
15. Hobona
16. Goshwe

== Members of Parliament ==
Key: BDP UDC BCP

Election	Winner
1965 election	Obed Chilume
1969 election	Obed Chilume
1974 election	Obed Chilume
1979 election	Obed Chilume
1984 election	Obed Chilume
1989 election	Obed Chilume
1994 election	Obed Chilume
1999 election	Ambrose Masalila
2004 election	Ambrose Masalila
2009 election	Edwin Batshu
2014 election	Edwin Batshu
2019 election	Never Tshabang
2024 election	Motlhaleemang Moalosi

== Election results ==
=== 2024 election ===
General election 2024: Nkange
Party	Candidate	Votes	%	±%
BCP	Motlhaleemang Moalosi	9,337	43.11	N/A
UDC	Never Tshabang	6,703	30.95	−17.50
BDP	Onkabetse Daniel	5,134	23.70	−18.76
BPF	David Vakalisa	486	2.24	N/A
Margin of victory		2,634	12.16	N/A
Total valid votes		21,660	99.11	−0.19
Rejected ballots		194	0.89	+0.19
Turnout		21,854	81.40	−3.14
Registered electors		26,847		
BCP gain from UDC		Swing	+30.31	

=== 2019 election ===
General election 2019: Nkange
Party	Candidate	Votes	%	±%
UDC	Never Tshabang	7,766	48.45	−0.65
BDP	Ishmael Mokghethi	6,806	42.46	−8.44
AP	Edison Wotho	1,458	9.10	N/A
Margin of victory		960	5.99	N/A
Total valid votes		16,030	99.30	+0.96
Rejected ballots		113	0.70	−0.96
Turnout		16,143	84.54	−0.40
Registered electors		19,094		
UDC gain from BDP		Swing	+3.90	

=== 2014 election ===
General election 2014: Nkange
Party	Candidate	Votes	%	±%
BDP	Edwin Batshu	6,461	50.90	−5.99
BCP	Never Tshabang	5,874	46.28	+3.17
UDC	Bigani Kgomotso	358	2.82	N/A
Margin of victory		587	4.62	−9.16
Total valid votes		12,693	98.34	+0.24
Rejected ballots		214	1.66	−0.24
Turnout		12,907	84.94	+9.98
Registered electors		15,196		
BDP hold		Swing	−4.58	

=== 2009 election ===
General election 2009: Nkange
Party	Candidate	Votes	%	±%
BDP	Edwin Batshu	6,094	56.89	+8.51
BCP	Batisani Maswibili	4,618	43.11	+6.92
Margin of victory		1,476	13.78	+1.59
Total valid votes		10,712	98.10	+0.44
Rejected ballots		207	1.90	−0.44
Turnout		10,919	74.96	−3.52
Registered electors		14,567		
BDP hold		Swing	+7.72	

=== 2004 election ===
General election 2004: Nkange
Party	Candidate	Votes	%	±%
BDP	Ambrose Masalila	4,246	48.38	−4.76
BCP	Batisani Maswibili	3,176	36.19	+15.57
BAM	Gideon Kaelo	1,355	15.44	+1.07
Margin of victory		1,070	12.19	−20.33
Total valid votes		8,777	97.66	+3.67
Rejected ballots		210	2.34	−3.67
Turnout		8,987	78.48	+5.12
Registered electors		11,452		
BDP hold		Swing	−10.17	

=== 1999 election ===
General election 1999: Nkange
Party	Candidate	Votes	%	±%
BDP	Ambrose Masalila	3,925	53.14	+1.66
BCP	Batisani Maswibili	1,523	20.62	N/A
BAM	Gideon Kaelo	1,061	14.37	N/A
Independent	I. Mchinyi	877	11.87	N/A
Margin of victory		2,402	32.52	+23.07
Total valid votes		7,386	93.99	N/A
Rejected ballots		472	6.01	N/A
Turnout		7,858	73.36	−1.47
Registered electors		10,711		
BDP hold		Swing	+11.14	

=== 1994 election ===
General election 1994: Nkange
Party	Candidate	Votes	%	±%
BDP	Obed Chilume	3,694	51.48	−6.49
BPU	Oteng Balisi	3,016	42.03	+6.01
BNF	L. Gaothusi	465	6.48	N/A
Margin of victory		678	9.45	−12.50
Turnout		7,175	74.83	+8.10
Registered electors		9,588		
BDP hold		Swing	−6.25	

=== 1989 election ===
General election 1989: Nkange
Party	Candidate	Votes	%	±%
BDP	Obed Chilume	3,518	57.97	+8.71
BPU	Daniel Kwele	2,186	36.02	−7.09
BPP	Simon Balole	365	6.01	−1.62
Margin of victory		1,332	21.95	+15.80
Turnout		6,069	66.73	−3.32
Registered electors		9,095		
BDP hold		Swing	+7.90	

=== 1984 election ===
General election 1984: Nkange
Party	Candidate	Votes	%	±%
BDP	Obed Chilume	2,875	49.26	−35.74
BPU	Daniel Kwele	2,516	43.11	N/A
BPP	Simon Balole	445	7.63	−7.37
Margin of victory		359	6.15	−87.78
Turnout		5,836	70.05	+24.74
Registered electors		8,331		
BDP hold		Swing	−39.43	

=== 1979 election ===
General election 1979: Nkange
Party	Candidate	Votes	%	±%
BDP	Obed Chilume	2,992	85.00	+3.50
BPP	S.P.P. Balule	528	15.00	−3.50
Margin of victory		2,464	70.00	+7.00
Turnout		3,520	45.31	+8.41
Registered electors		7,769		
BDP hold		Swing	+3.50	

=== 1974 election ===
General election 1974: Nkange
Party	Candidate	Votes	%	±%
BDP	Obed Chilume	1,097	81.50	+13.26
BPP	S.P.P. Balule	249	18.50	−1.35
Margin of victory		848	63.00	+22.01
Turnout		1,346	36.90	−26.97
Registered electors		6,679		
BDP hold		Swing	+7.31	

=== 1969 election ===
General election 1969: Nkange
Party	Candidate	Votes	%	±%
BDP	Obed Chilume	1,341	68.24	−19.61
BPP	B. Duna	390	19.85	+7.70
BNF	D. Kwele	208	10.59	N/A
BIP	M. Lowane	26	1.32	N/A
Margin of victory		951	48.39	−27.31
Turnout		3,423	40.99	N/A
Registered electors		4,794		
BDP hold		Swing	−13.66	

=== 1965 election ===
General election 1965: Nkange
Party	Candidate	Votes	%
BDP	Obed Chilume	4,193	87.85
BPP	O. Sinombe	580	12.15
Margin of victory		3,613	75.70
Turnout		4,773	N/A
Registered electors		N/A	
BDP win (new seat)			
