= Baka-Nswazwi =

The Ba-ka-Nswazwi people are originally Bapedi of Mujaji (Rain Queen). The Bapedi of Mujaji are Kalangas originally from Munomutapa and were ruled by Mugudo. They are found in Tutume, Nswazwi, Marapong, Masunga and Nkange in Botswana.

== History ==
The Baka-Nswazwi have been assimilated back over the years into their Kalanga (Bakalanga) culture. In the 18th century they migrated into present-day Botswana from the Polokwane (Pietersburg) area of the present-day Limpopo province. They settled in the Bukalanga area, which was ruled by the Mambo of the Kalanga. The Mambo was later subdued by the forces of Mzilikazi of the Ndebele, who after his death in 1868 was succeeded by his son Lobengula. Lobengula was not favourably disposed to the establishment of the Bechuanaland Protectorate in 1885. He expressed resentment that Khama III should fix the northern border of the protectorate without consulting him.·Lobengula did not believe that the 22° demarcation line had been drawn in London but believed it had been put forward by Khama. Furthermore, he was angry that he had not been consulted before a protectorate was imposed over Bechuanaland.

Later they were led by John Nswazwi, who was born in Nswazwi in then Bechuanaland in 1875. John Nswazwi was exiled to Mafikeng in 1947 by the colonial government as a result of a conflict with the Bangwato regent Tshekedi Khama. The Baka-Nswazwi considered themselves independent of Bangwato and that they had only been brought under Bangwato lordship during the creation of the Bechuanaland Protectorate. The Baka-Nswazwi questioned whether they fell within the Protectorate, and indeed under Bangwato in the Bamangwato Territory. This was the gist of their confrontation with Tshekedi Khama, and all other matters that came up were skirmishes around this root cause. Tshekedi Khama was the uncle of Seretse Khama, the first president of Botswana.

Chief Nswazwi died on May 14, 1960. He was buried in Jetjeni and his remains were later transferred to Nswazwi village in 2002.
