= Kalanga people =

Bantu ethnic group found in Botswana, South Africa and Zimbabwe

BaKalanga
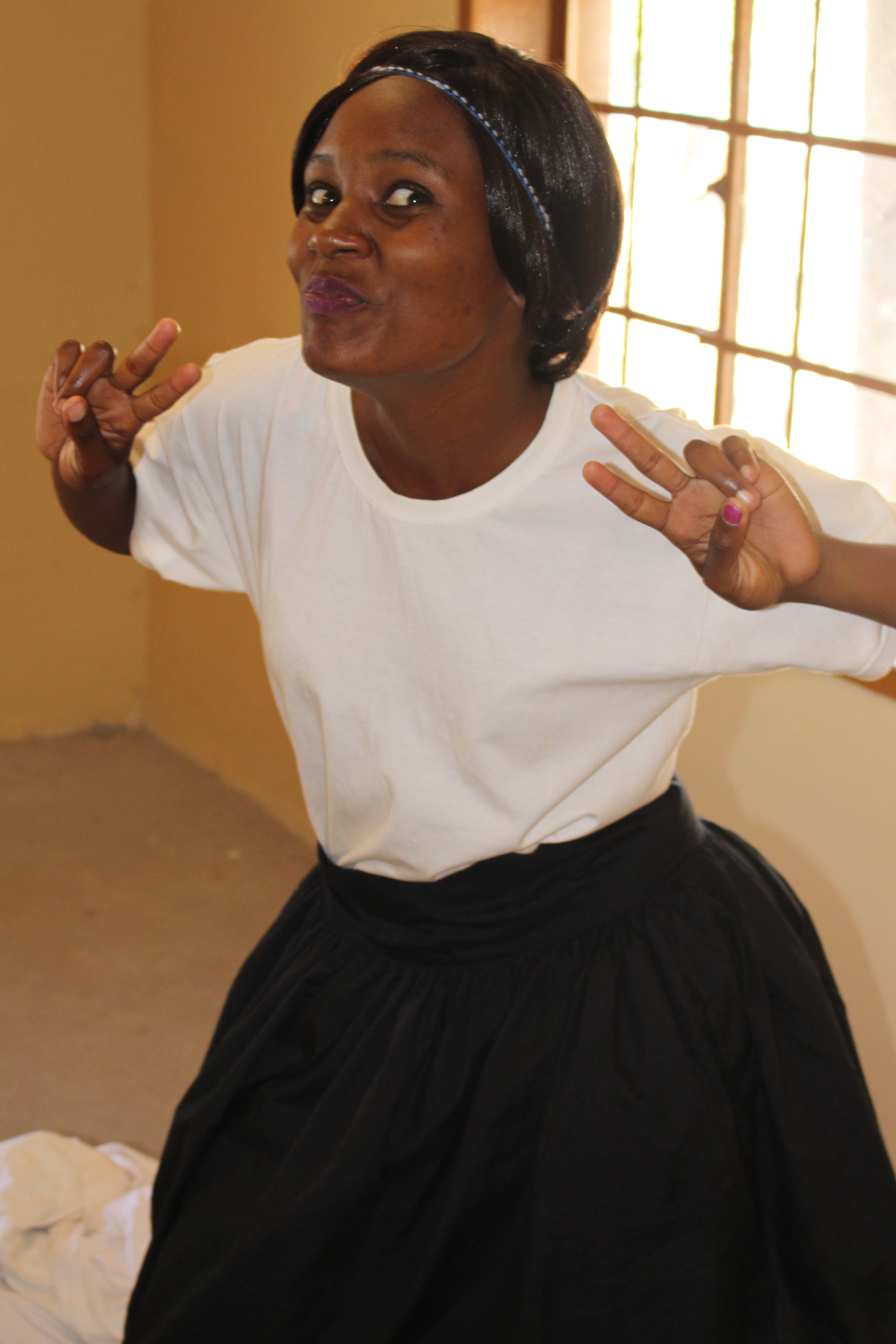
- Kalanga woman from Botswana

Total population
- 2.01 million

Regions with significant populations
- Zimbabwe: 1.205 million
- Botswana: 800,000

Languages
- TjiKalanga, Xitsonga, Venda

Religion
- African Traditional Religion, Christianity

Related ethnic groups
- Other Shonic/Shona people, Venda people, and Southern Bantu peoples

The Kalanga or BaKalanga are a southern Bantu ethnic group mainly inhabiting Matebeleland in Zimbabwe, northern Botswana, and parts of the Limpopo Province in South Africa.

The BaKalanga of Botswana are the second largest ethnic group in the country, and their Kalanga language being the second most spoken in the country (most prevalent in the North). The TjiKalanga language of Zimbabwe is the third most spoken language in the country, however, being recognised as a Western Shona branch of the Shona group of languages. It is likewise used in mass media.

== Clans ==
The most notable Kalanga clans are the boSungwasha, boMndambeli, boNeswimbo, boNtombo, boKumbudzi, boKadzasha, and boPhizha na boNebukhwa.

- Bo-Sungwasha: The largest of these clans are the Sungwasha clan as they are found in each Kalanga village, district and town in both Botswana and Zimbabwe. They are also known as BaWumbe/Tjibelu. BaWumbe tribe are found as far as Zambia and Zimbabwe, known to be living and staying among the BaTonga tribe.
- Bo-Mndambeli: The following clan would be the Mndambeli people as they are found dominantly in the Boteti District using the Shoko as well as Zhou and Tshuma as their totems as well as the North-East District (Botswana) and Tutume districts venerating the Ghudo or Tembo. The Mndambeli are also found among the Shona people of Zimbabwe, often referred to as Mwendamberi and they are also found among VhaVenda, where they are called VhoMudabeli.
- Bo-Ntombo/Baperi: The Ntombo (otherwise referred to as Baperi) would then follow suit as the third largest clan being found scattered in a number of villages however, often under the leadership of either the Sungwasha or Mndambeli people. They are also found in the area around Plumtree, Zimbabwe town. History goes to state that BoNtombo are believed to be descendants of the Balobedu people found in South Africa who are today a section of the Bapedi tribe.
- BoKumbudzi: This clan is found in fewer numbers as they are mostly the ones with the spiritual gifts to communicate with Mwali at Njelele Shrine. They believe that it is a gift for a select few. They are sometimes referred to as boNebukhwa.

== Language ==
The native language of the Kalanga people is referred to as Ikalanga or TjiKalanga. The language has a number of tribal dialects depending on which part of the tribal territory you are situated. There are among others the Talaunda dialect, the Lilima dialect, Jawunda dialect, the Nanzwa dialect, Tjigwizi dialect as well as Tjindodondo dialect (dominant in Zimbabwe). Together with the Nambya language, these varieties form the western branch of the shona group (Guthrie S.10) that also includes Central Shona. Kalanga-speakers once numbered over 1,900,000, though they are now reduced, often speaking Ndebele or Central Shona languages in Zimbabwe, Tswana in Botswana, and other local languages of the surrounding peoples of southern Africa.

The BaKalanga are one of the largest ethnolinguistic groups in Botswana. The 1946 census indicated that there were 39,773 (49% of the numerically largest district) BaKalanga in the Bamangwato (Central) District.

== History ==
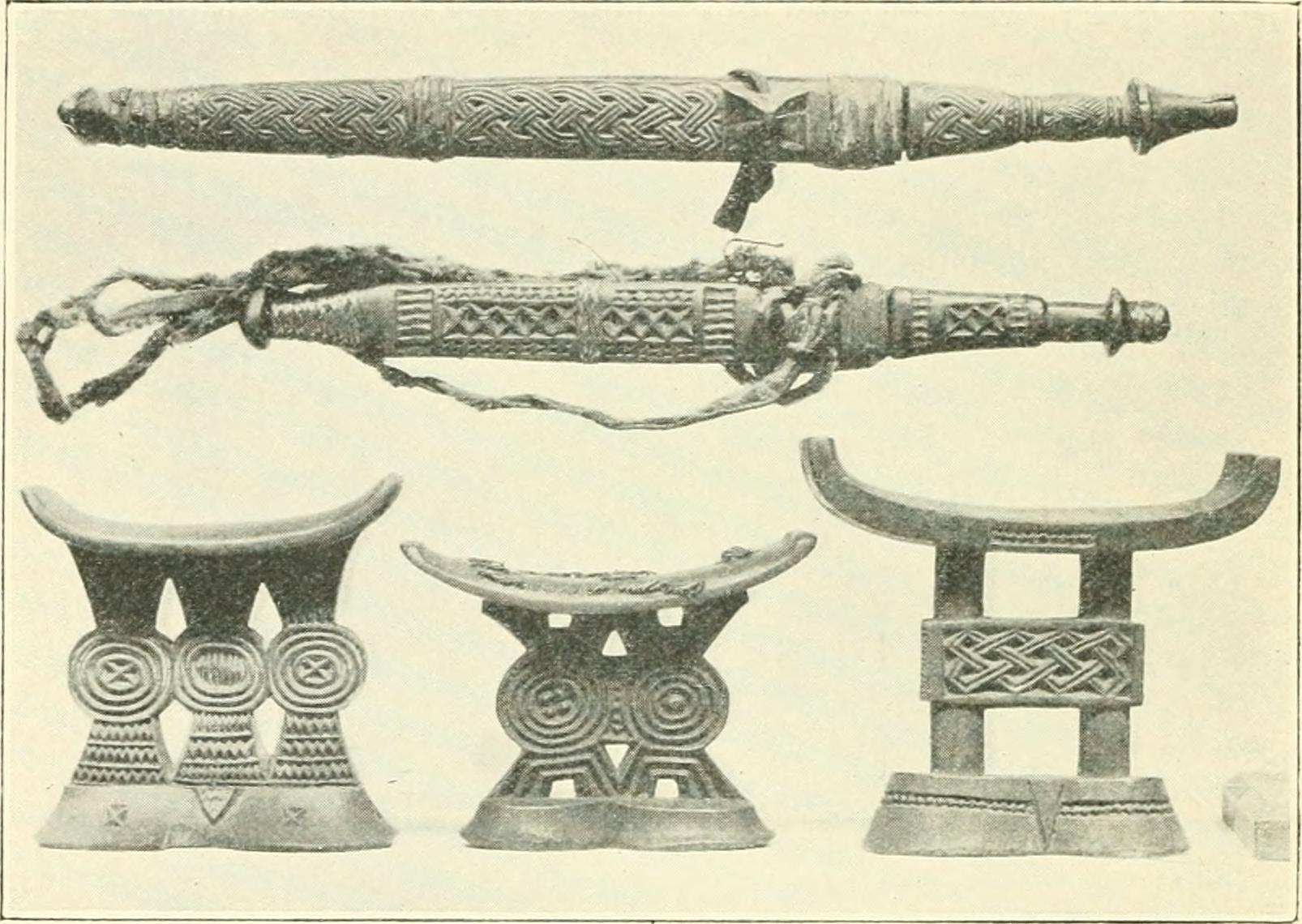
Kalanga knives with wooden sheaths; wooden pillows. From a 1910 ethnographical work.

According to Huffman (2008), the original Bakalanga people descended from the late Leopard's Kopje farmers in 1050. These people occupied areas covering parts of north eastern Botswana, western and southern Zimbabwe, adjacent parts of South Africa by around AD 1100. They traded in ivory, furs and feathers with the Indian Ocean coast for goods such as glass beads and cotton clothes. The majority of these prehistoric Bakalanga villages have been discovered in Botswana and Zimbabwe in areas close to major rivers and were usually built on terraced hilltops with stone walls built around them.

The Kalanga are linked to such early African States as Mapungubgwe, Khami, and Great Zimbabwe. The early Bakalanga people living in the Shashe-Limpopo basin monopolised trade due to their access to the Indian Ocean coast with the help of the Shona and Venda who were already trading and developed in Gumanye and Zhizo-Leokwe cultures for 30 years before being annexed by the Mapungubwe Kingdom. By around AD 1220 a new and more powerful kingdom developed around Mapungubwe Hill, near the tripoint of Zimbabwe, Botswana and South Africa. Some of the early Bakalanga people living in the lower Shashe-Limpopo valley probably moved towards or became part of this newly formed kingdom. But studies of climatic data from the area suggest that a disastrous drought soon struck Mapungubgwe, and the Shashe-Limpopo region was uninhabited between A.D 1300 and 1420, forcing the ordinary population to scatter. Mapungubgwe had become a ghost town by AD 1290. Its golden era lasted no more than 48 years culminating in the rise of Great Zimbabwe.

Later, in the 15th century, the centre of power moved back west, from Great Zimbabwe to Khami/Nkami. The moves were accompanied by changes of the dominance from one clan to another. In the 17th century, the Rozvi established southern BaKalanga became a powerful competitor, but when they were finally annexed, they controlled most of the mining areas. The Rozvi even repelled Portuguese colonists from some of their inland posts.

In south-western Zimbabwe (now Matabeleland) and adjacent parts of present-day Botswana, Kalanga states survived for more than another century. The fall of the Kingdom of Butua came as a result of a series of invasions. Changamire Dombo who was actually part Kalanga led his army to march on their capital which crumbled the state in the late spring of 1683. The area of the BaKalanga were invaded many times taking the lives of hundreds of thousands maybe millions, beginning with the Bangwato Kgosi Kgari's ill-fated incursion of around 1828 and culminating in the onslaught of Mzilikazi's Amandebele.

== Rain-making ==
The Kalanga people are known for their rain-making abilities through their Supreme Being Mwali/Ngwali. These abilities have always been a part of the BaKalanga people history as well as all those other related groups. The rain-making has always been the duty of the Hosanna's or Wosana (the high priests in Mwali/Ngwali's church). The traditional attire of the Kalanga/BaKalanga people clearly shows the importance of rain to BaKalanga. They put on black skirts which represent dark clouds heavy with rain, and the white shirts to represent rain droplets. This is the attire worn when they go and plead for rain at Njelele shrine in Zimbabwe, which is the headquarters for the Hosanna's of Botswana, South Africa and Zimbabwe.

== Bakalanga villages and towns ==
- Shashe-Mooke
- Mbambanyika
- Mopipi
- Nata-Gweta
- Changate
- Xhumo
- Makalamabedi
- Kandana
- Gombalume
- Magalanyeza
- Tjangula
- Gwambe
- Mbila
- Mabungwe
- Bambadzi
- Masukwane
- Mulambakwena
- Tutume
- Maitengwe
- Nswazwi
- Nshakashongwe
- Matenge
- Makaleng
- Tjizwina
- Hulela
- Mpatane
- Mathangwane
- Masunga
- Gambule
- Sekakangwe
- Vhukwi
- Zwenshambe
- Kalakamati
- Sinotsi
- Matobo
- Semitwe
- Marapong
- Sebina
- Butale
- Ramokgwebana
- Mapoka
- Tokwana
- Masendu
- Nhopemano
- Mafule
- Makumbi
- Mbimba
- Tjolotjo
- Masingwaneng
- Tsamaya
- Mosetse
- Dagwi
- Nkange
- Senete
- Matjinge
- Gulubane
- Themashanga
- Ntoli
- Nlapkhwane
- Gampo
- Khame ancient city of a Kalanga kingdom
- Tsholotsho
- Plumtree
- Gwaai
- Ndolwane
- Hwange
- Dete
- Lupane
- Kgari
- Moroka
- Sechele
- Letsholathebe
- Kalakamati
- Goshwe
- Madlambudzi
- Masendu
- Bhagani
- Makhekhe
- Bilingoma
- Malebegwa
- Sihore
- Malalume
- Malopa
- Bambadzi
- Hingwe
- Jutjume
- Makhulela
- Tjehanga
- Mbalambi
- Lemu
- Ngwana
- Butshe
- Nswazwi
- Gutu
- Dombodema
- Hikwa
- Male
- Tjompani
- Sevaka
- mafeha
- mabhongani
- Mathangwane
- Makorokoro
- Hhobodo
- Madabe
- Tjingababili
- Mafule
