= Collen Vixen Kelapile =

Botswana diplomat

The Honourable Collen Vixen Kelapile

77th President of the United Nations Economic and Social Council
- In office 23 July 2021 – 27 July 2022
- Preceded by: H. E. Munir Akram
- Succeeded by: Lachezara Stoeva

Ambassador and Permanent Representative of Botswana to the United Nations
- Incumbent
- Assumed office 26 October 2018
- Preceded by: Charles Thembani Ntwaagae

Personal details
- Born: 10 July 1968 (age 58) Maitengwe, Botswana
- Education: University of Botswana

Collen Vixen Kelapile (born 10 July 1968, Maitengwe, Botswana) is the ambassador and permanent representative of Botswana to the United Nations since 2018. On 23 July 2021 he was elected President of the United Nations Economic and Social Council for the 2022 session.

== Early life and career ==
After attending Mengwe Primary School in Maitengwe and Molefi Secondary School in Kgatleng District, Kelapile undertook the mandatory Tirelo Sechaba programme in a rural area of Sojwe, Kweneng District, from 1989 to 1990, during which he was assigned to a medical clinic adjoining a team of practitioners, including social workers. He then moved to Gaborone to attend the University of Botswana from 1991 to 1995, obtaining a Bachelor's degree in public administration and political science.

Kelapile began working at the Ministry of International Affairs and Cooperation as a desk officer in the United Nations section in 1995, before attending training at the Foreign Service Institute in New Delhi, India, in 1996.

Kelapile participated in a United Nations Department of Peace Operations seminar on the conduct of United Nations peacekeeping operations in Gaborone in 1997, having previously attended a workshop on record retention and disposal for action officers in 1996. He attended a United Nations Institute for Training and Research workshop on the United Nations budgetary process in 2000 and was among the participants in the United Nations resolutions on structure, drafting and adoption in 1999.

== Diplomacy ==
He was moved to Permanent Mission of the Republic of Botswana to the United Nations in 1998, of which he later became second secretary for a period of two years and into counsellor in 2003. He served as a delegate to the Fifth Committee of the United Nations General Assembly, and as vice-chair on the Bureau of the Fifth Committee at the 55th session of the General Assembly in 2001 as well as Vice-Chair of the Committee for Programme and Coordination at its 42nd session in 2002. He was also Coordinator of the African Group of Experts in the Fifth Committee until 2003.

Kelapile has been active in multilateral diplomacy for more than 26 years, having served as a staff member of the United Nations Secretariat as a member of the Advisory Committee on Administrative and Budgetary Questions from 2004 to 2012, although, of which he was Vice-Chair from 2008 to 2011 and Chair from 2011 to 2012. He was Deputy Director of the Department of Africa and the Middle East in the Ministry of International Affairs and Cooperation of Botswana throughout the Africa regions from 2013 to 2014, and became Chief of Staff to the Executive-Secretary of the United Nations Economic Commission for Africa in Addis Ababa from 2014 until he became Ambassador and Permanent Representative of Botswana to the United Nations in 2018. He is also concurrently Botswana's Ambassador to Cuba and High Commissioner to Jamaica on a non-resident basis, and among other positions he has held was Vice-President of the Economic and Social Council for the 2021 session, co-chair of the Group of Friends on the Responsibility to Protect for the United Nations to 2023, co-chair of the Joint Steering Committee of the African Group-CARRICOM Caucus (of which he is also co-founder, together with the Permanent Representative of Grenada) since 2020.

== Family ==
Kelapile is married and has a son. He is fluent in English, Setswana and Ikalanga.

Diplomatic posts
Preceded by Charles Thembani Ntwaagae	Botswana Ambassador to the United Nations; 2018-present	Incumbent
