= Nambya people =

The Nambya people (Note: alternative spellings and names for the Nambya people include: Nambiya, BaNambya, Nanzva, BaNanzva, Nanzwa, BaNanzwa) are an ethnic group of about 100,000 people, based in the north-western parts of Zimbabwe and in the north-eastern parts of Botswana, who speak the Nambya language. They are found around the coal mining town of Hwange, surrounding areas of the Victoria Falls as well as in the north-eastern parts of Botswana namely, Pandamatenga, Chobe, Maremaoto, Gweta, Shorobe, Kumaga, Tsienyane, Zoroga, Chumo, Makalamabedi, Sankoyo, Lesoma, Xhumo, Mopipi, Broadhurst, Rakops, Shoshong, Palapye and Maun. Hwange Town and the Hwange National Park were named after the BaNambya King Sawanga, who was later called Hwange by the Nambya people. The Kalanga tribes who were captured by the Nambya warriors from the former Rozvi Empire of the Great Zimbabwe influenced the Nambya language which resulted in the changed pronunciation of words and tone.

The BaNambya people are also the native inhabitants of the area around Hwange National Park, the second biggest national park in Africa after Kruger National Park in South Africa, which boasts the Big Five game. Hwange is a mere 100 km from the resort town of Victoria Falls in the far north west of Matebeleland North Province. The Nambya people are related to the Kalanga. The BaNambya came from Great Zimbabwe, and conquered some Kalanga tribes along their way to Hwange, Victoria Falls and the north-eastern parts of Botswana, which changed the Nambya language and made it similar to TjiKalanga. The BaNambya were being led by a subchief of the Great Zimbabwe by the name of Denderende Sawanga and went to present day Dete which is where they settled. Some went on to live in Bumbusi. This is proven by the stone structures that were built by the Nambya that are similar to that of Great Zimbabwe. The BaNambya Royal leadership in Zimbabwe includes the BaNambya Chief Shana, BaNambya Chief Hwange, BaNambya Chief Nekatambe, BaNambya Chief Nelukoba, Botswana BaShe BechiNambya NShe Shashe Shakwa. Royal leadership in Botswana includes BaShe BechiNambya being NShe Manchebu, NShe Makonyela, NShe Nakwela, NShe Montsho, NShe Masusu, NShe Shambi, NShe Sumbami, NShe Manchebu Phaphadza, NShe Bahalole, NShe Meseche and NShe Mazwimbo.
