= Indigenous religion in Zimbabwe =

Religions native to Zimbabwe

Indigenous religion in Zimbabwe is explained in terms of the Zimbabwe ethnic groups, beliefs, norms and values, rites and rituals, ceremonies and celebrations. Indigenous religion is more carried out by living it than with its theory. Religion among the Africans is very important, it plays a vital role for the individuals, the family and the community as a whole. Bourdlillon asserts that indigenous religion is one, though there can be various manifestation just like Christianity which is one but has various denominations. Thomas Gale defined the word indigenous as to anything that is native to a particular geographical culture. Mbiti says in Zimbabwe Indigenous religion is in two classes, the Ndebele and Shona. However, Zimbabwe has a lot of minority tribes including the Tonga, Venda, Kalanga and Sothu.

== Characteristics of Indigenous Religion ==
=== The existence of spirits ===
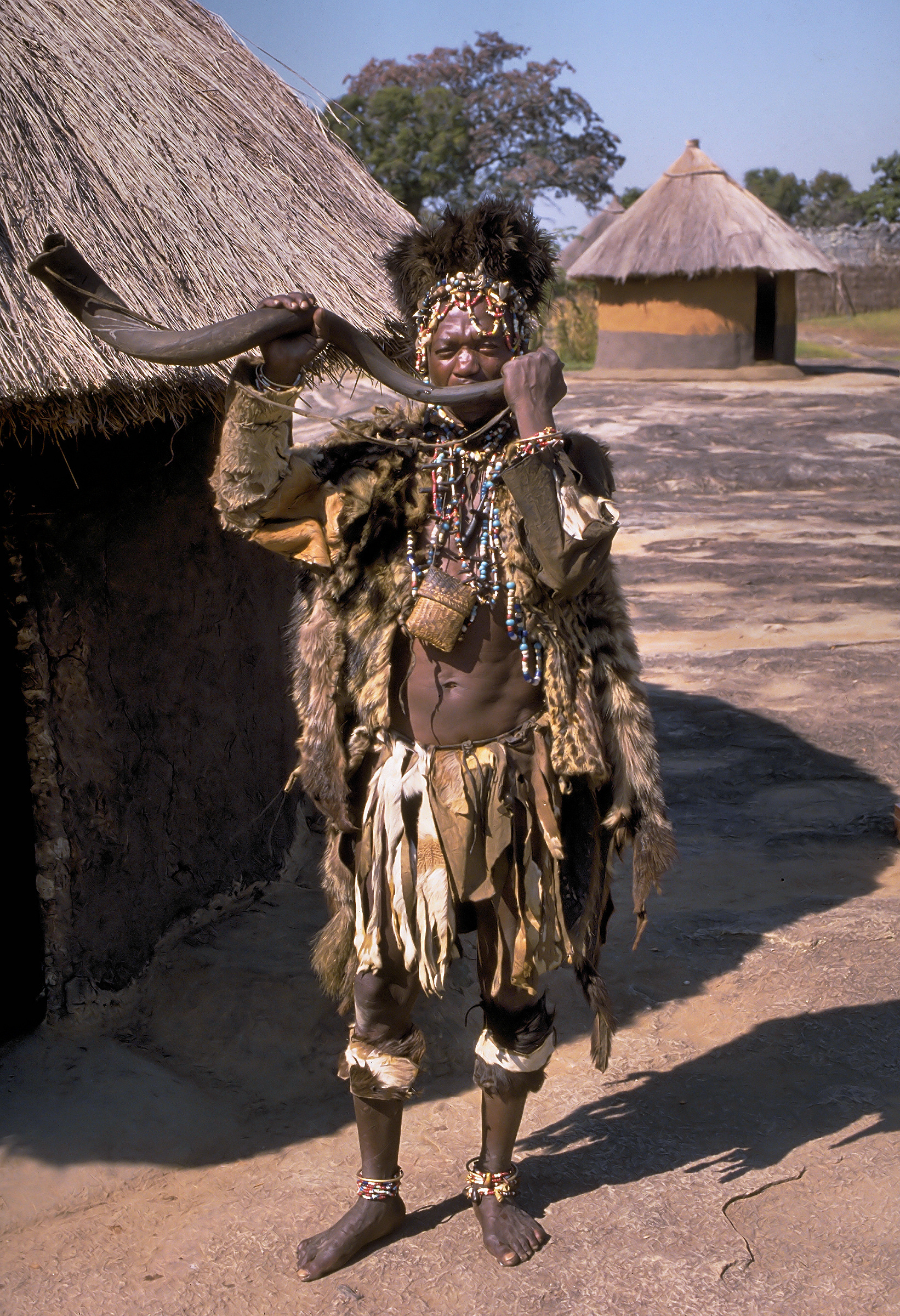
Shona traditional healer, or n'anga close to Great Zimbabwe, Zimbabwe

In indigenous religion, the activities and actions of Spirits govern all social and spiritual phenomena.

The Shona and Ndebele people believe that spirits are everywhere, spirits coexist with people.

=== Belief in God ===
Zimbabweans believe in God the Supreme Being who is referred to by many names depending on the tribe and occasion. Ndebele call him, uNkulunkulu, uThixo, uMdali or uMvelinqangi. The Shona call him Mwari, Ishe, or Musikavanhu.

=== Belief in life after death ===
It is believed that when one dies, they live on and can still hear and make decisions on life, thus taking an ancestral form living in the world of the spirits. There is communication between the dead and the living, whom the living believe to be their guardians in life.

=== Ancestral Spirits ===
During hard times, one can turn to their Ancestral spirits to help.

1. They are regarded as good and important.
2. They are protectors of people and land (territorial spirits).
3. They are intermediates between people and the Supreme being.
4. They do not cause harm.
5. They fight evil spirits away from their family.
6. They influence proper moral behavior.
7. They guide the living.

=== Sacred places ===
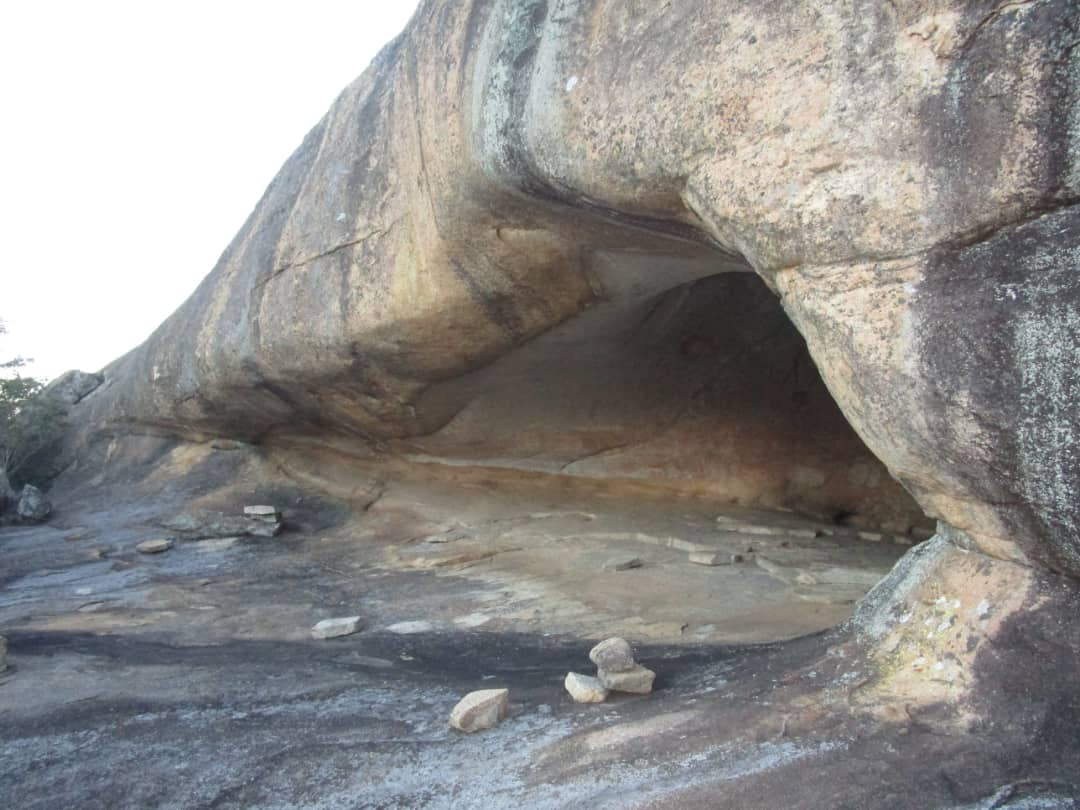
outside view of a sacred cave

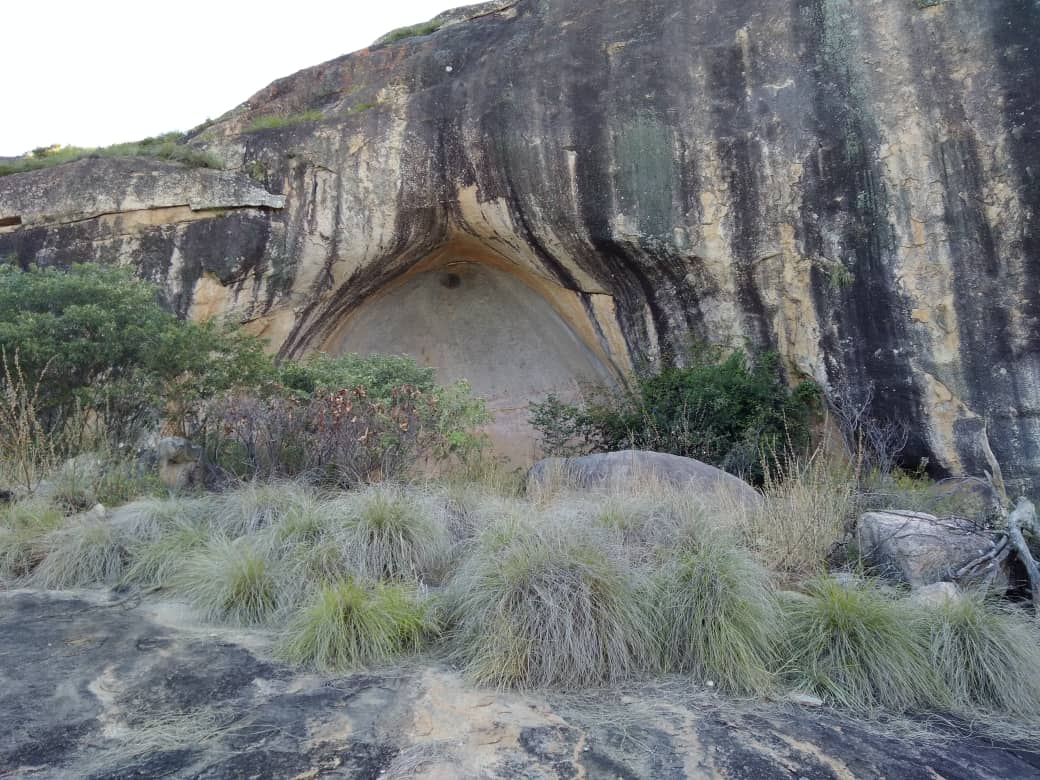
Sacred places

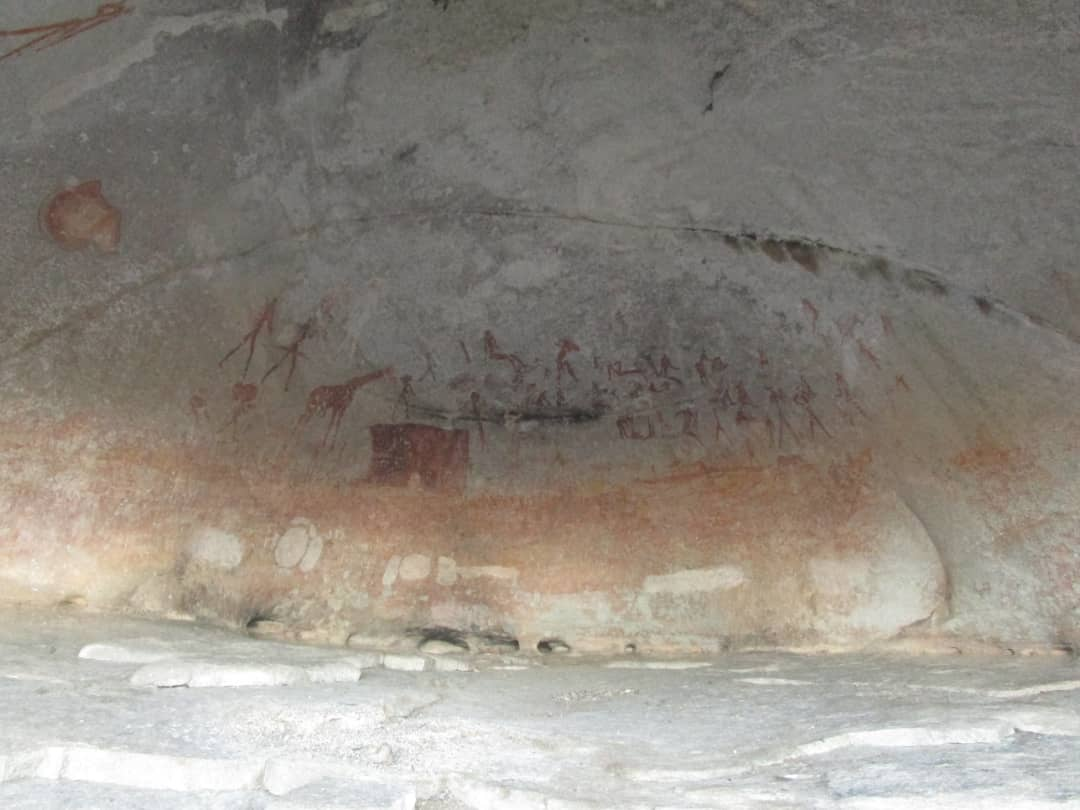
Prehistoric drawings in Silozwana cave

There are a lot of sacred places in Zimbabwe. It is a place where the spirits dwell. These are holy, godly or divine and highly respected places. They are significant because that is where the sacred practitioner communicates with the ancestors. These can be a hill, caves, rivers, trees and mountains. Examples include Njelele, Gulabahwe Cave, Silozwana caves, Diana's pool and Chinhoyi Caves.

=== Ceremonies ===
1. Rain making ceremony
2. Umbuyiso
3. Ukuthethela

=== It is orally transmitted ===
There is no scripture or sacred text. These are transmitted orally; by word of mouth from one generation to the other.

=== Moral Code ===
The indigenous religion has a strong moral code based on the sacredness of other being. Failure to adhere to the moral code has strong repercussions in the afterlife. Respect for elders and honoring parents is one of the adhered to moral code. Killing, witchcraft, stealing, injuring others are some of the forbidden things through the moral code.

The concept of Ubuntu means that a human being cannot exist as a human being in isolation.(Louw, 1998)

== Historical spirit mediums ==
- Mbuya Nehanda
- Sekuru Kaguvi
- Sekemutema
- kawanzaruwa
