= Dihosana =

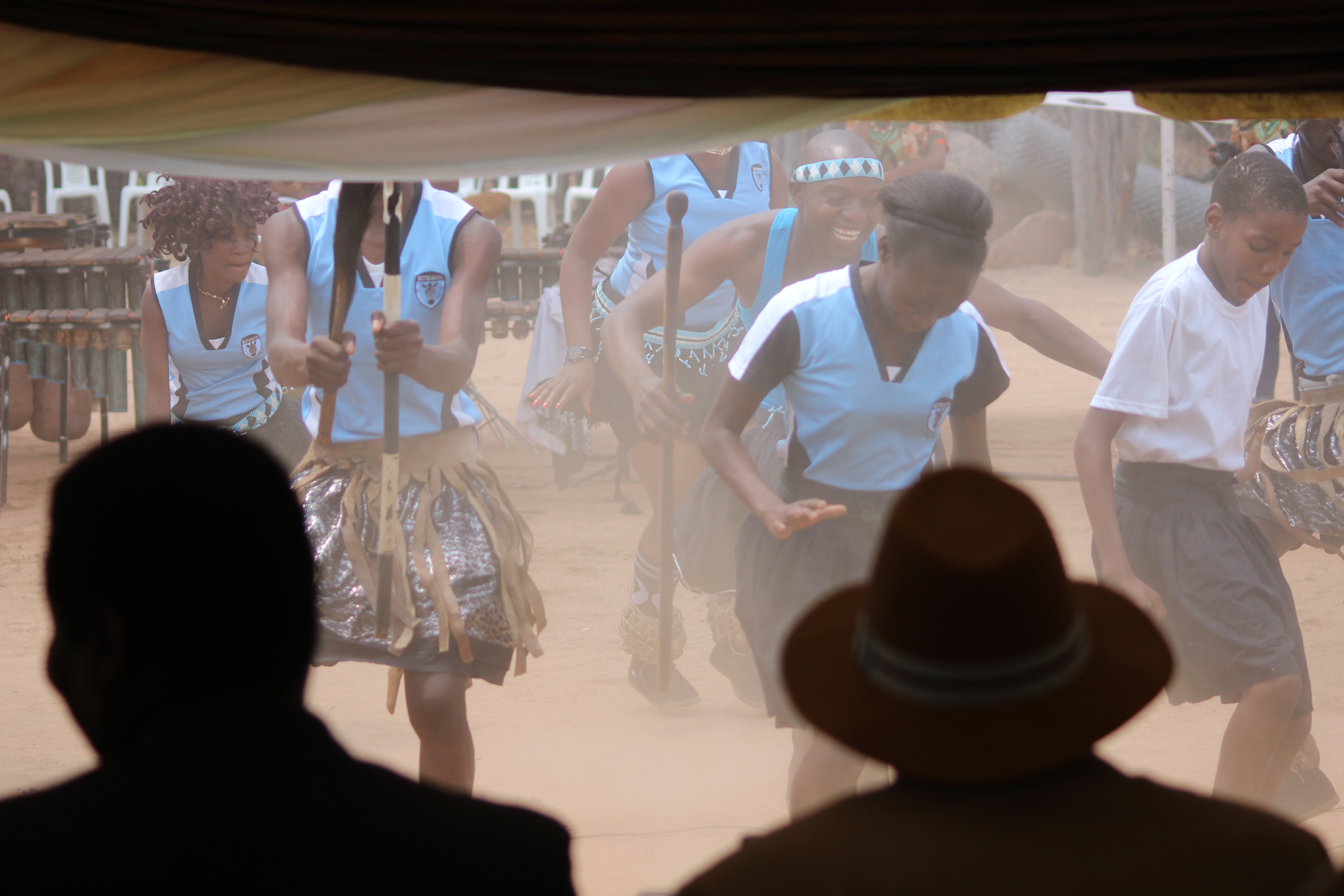
Dihosana dance troupe at Domboshaba monument

Hosana is a traditional dance by Kalanga people or Bakalanga people which existed for a long period of time. Hosana involves the invitation of ancestors through trance to pray for rain. It is a rain-making dance. Hosana is a dance heritage which has been inherited from the fore fathers by those practising it. People living in the north, approximately about 20 to 30 km north of Francistown, Botswana are believed to be the veteran elders of the Hosana dance, in a village called Makobo. Hosana is a Kalanga term an old and wise person. The dancers usually dance in groups and wear black skirts, and long strings of beads in their necks. The beads are grouped in many different colour categories from red, black and white, a myriad in the body and waist. Hosana is part of the Kalanga culture and not everyone qualifies to be a Hosana dancer.

== Gallery of photos ==
Dihosana ancestral dance images

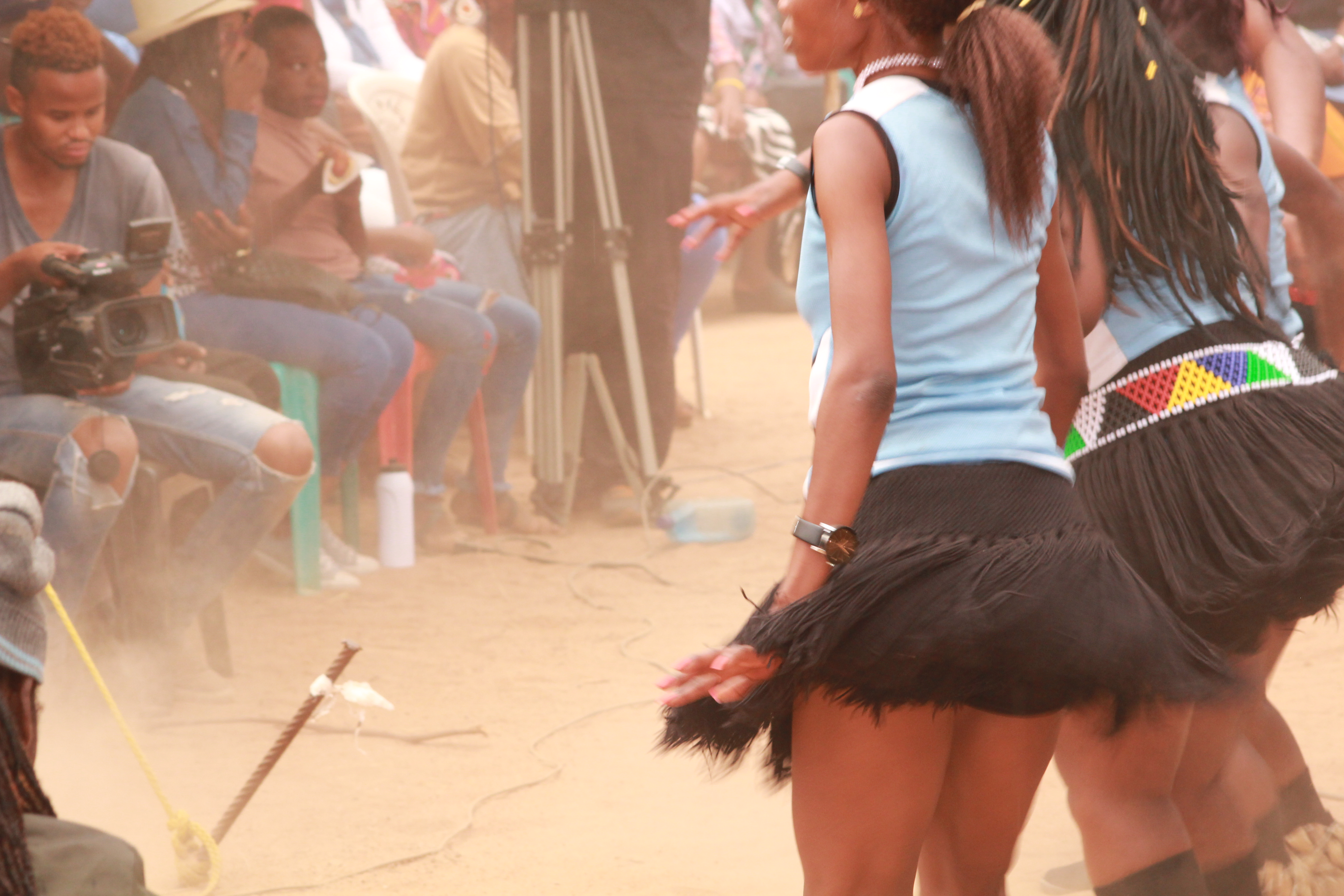

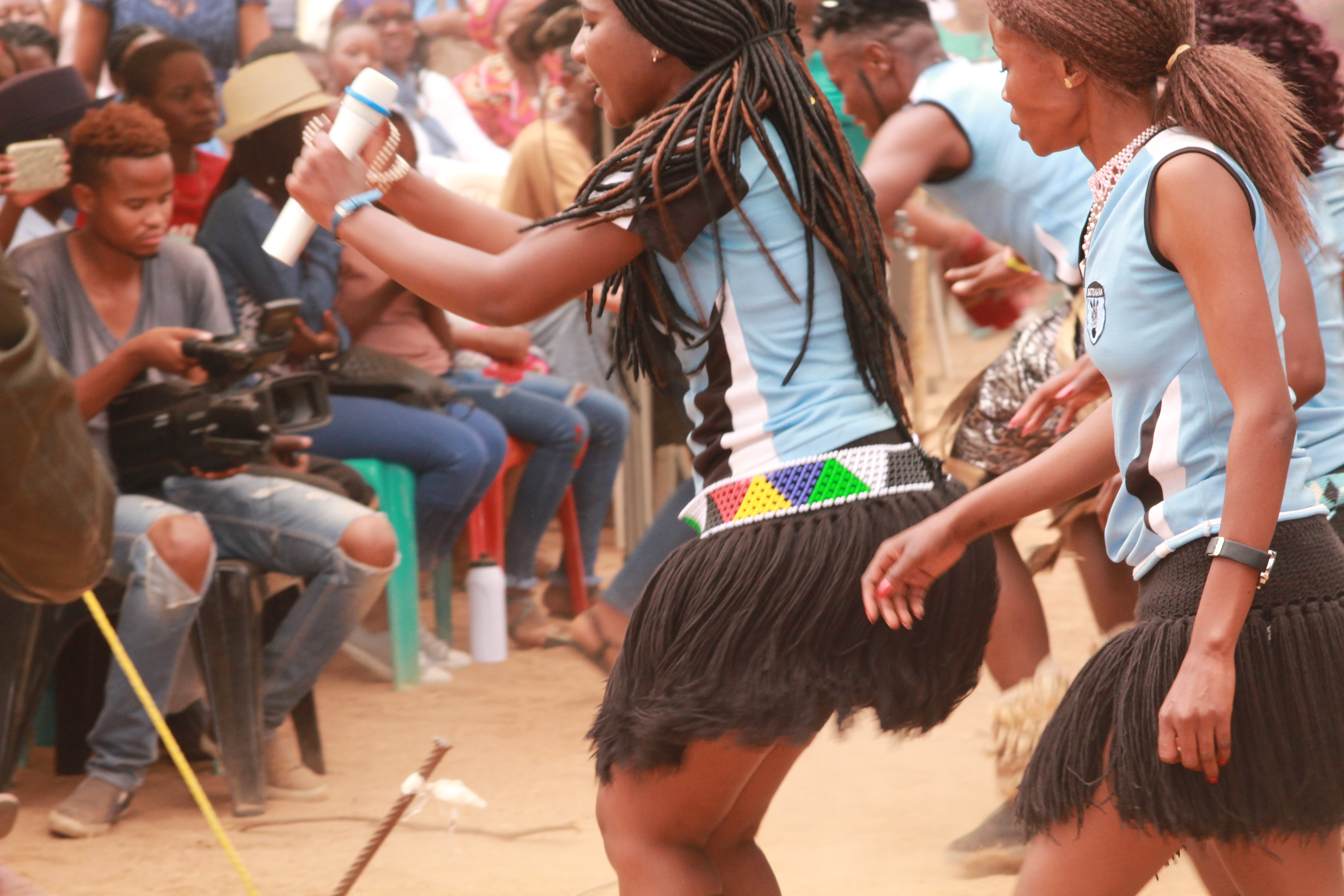

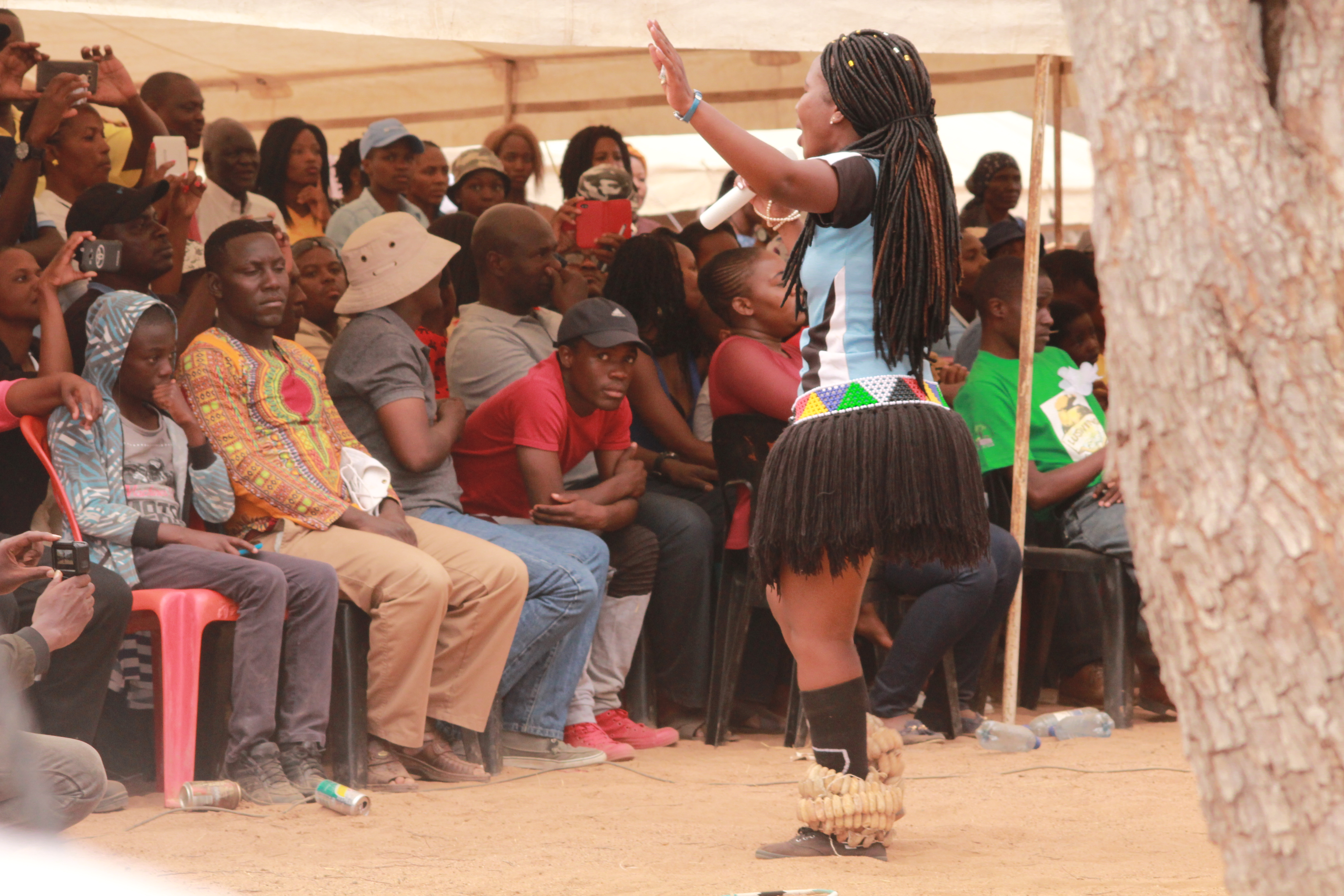

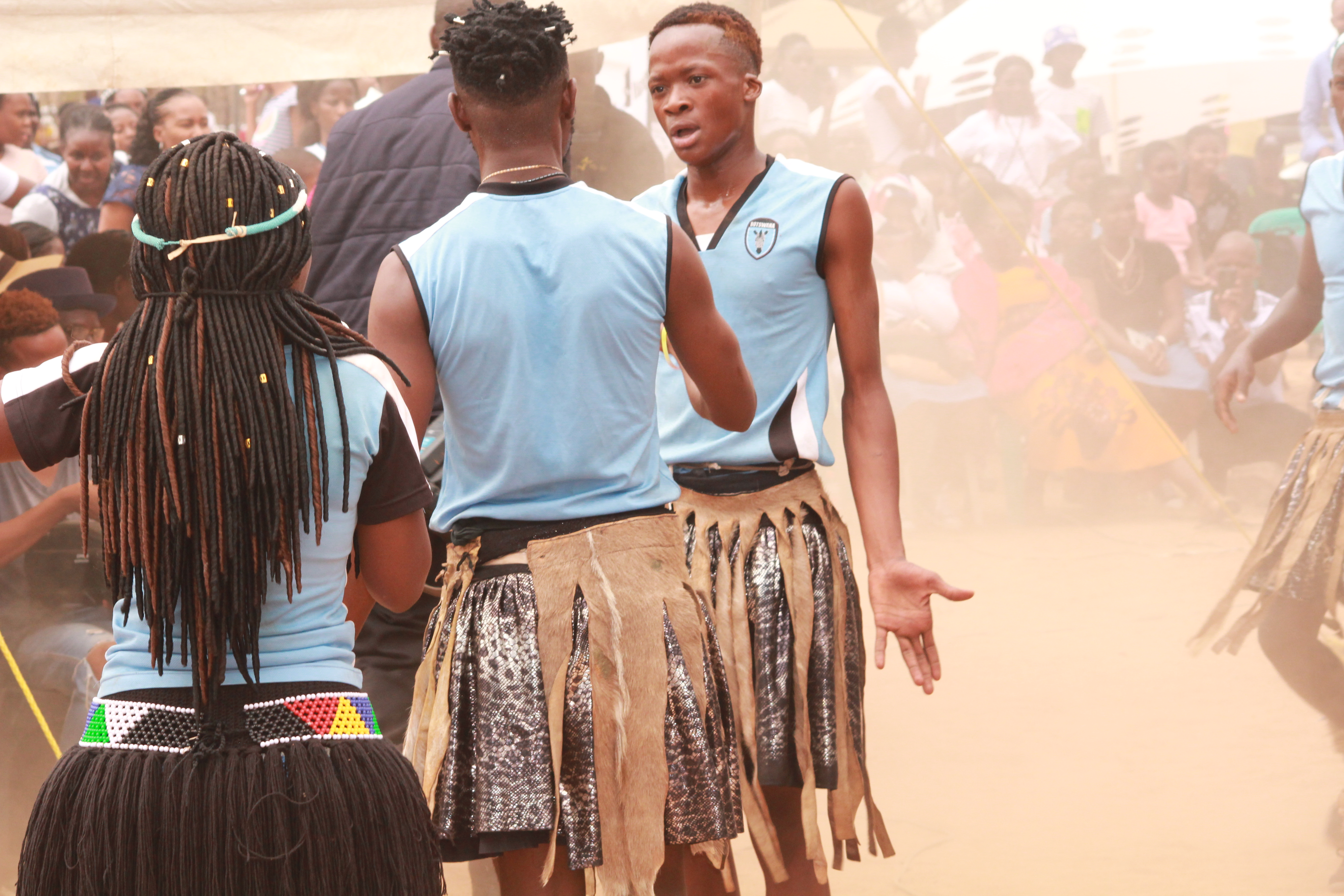

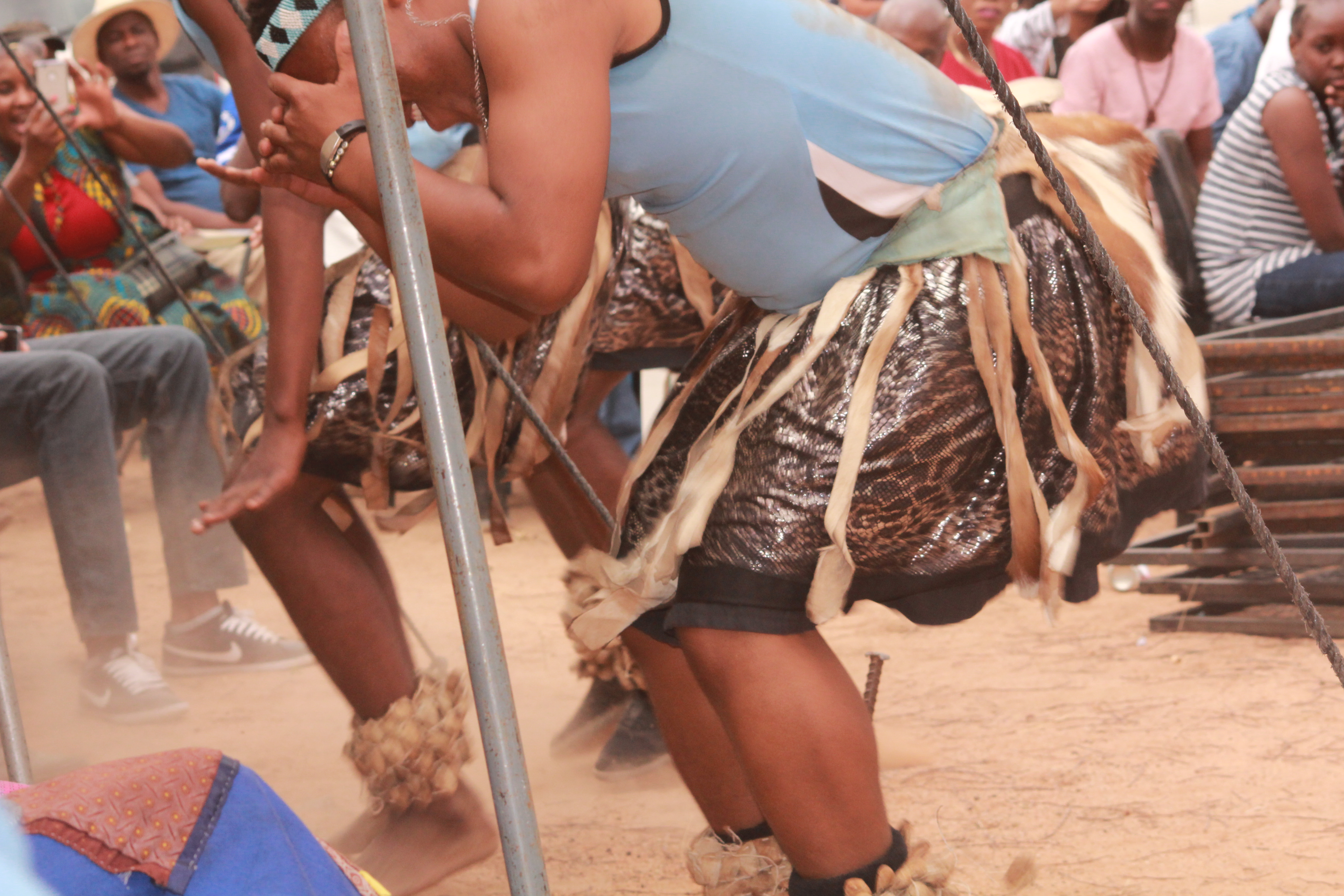

== How Hosana begins ==
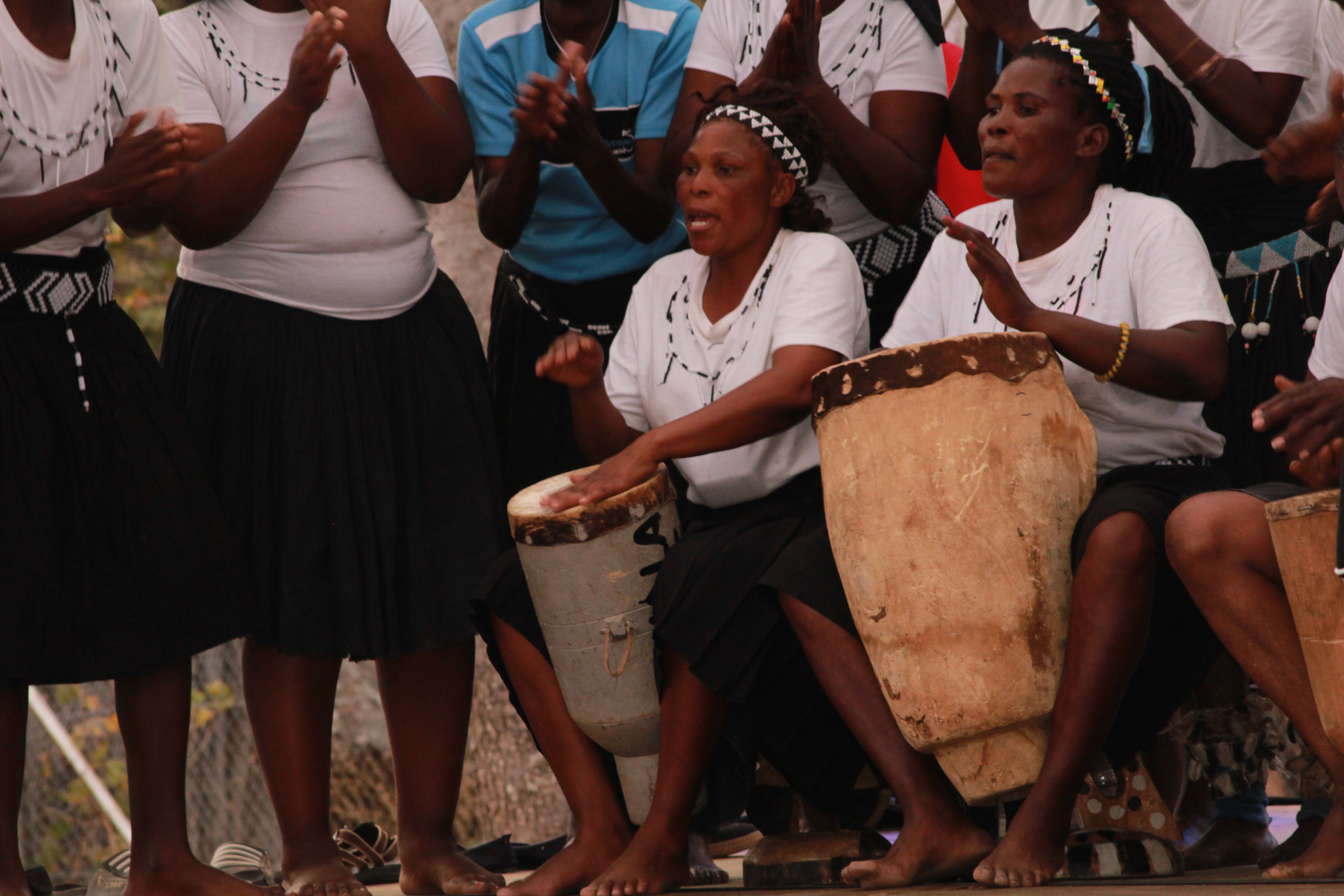
Hosanas at Domboshaba cultural festival

For one to be a Hosana, the person should have an ancestral calling. It comes not as a choice or preference. One becomes possessed with sickness that cannot be healed at the hospital. The person will then be taken to a hill called Ka Mwale where they meet up with their ancestors for initiation ceremony. When they arrive at Ka Mwale, they will meet up with a traditional doctor who will diagnose the patient for the availability of hosana spirits. Once they are done and the patient is declared to be having the spirits, they will start helping out with the steps for initiation.The person will be healed and will be a complete hosana after being attended by a traditional doctor. The person will now join other veteran hosanas to pray for rain.

It is believed that when there is drought in a village, the chief will approach the leader or elder of hosana so that they can pray for rain. The elder from veteran hosana will release someone to start by cleaning or sweeping the ground known as Sebata.
