= Ndabili Bashingili =

Botswana marathon runner

Personal information
- Nationality: Botswana
- Born: 28 December 1979 (age 46) Semitwe, Botswana
- Height: 1.72 m (5 ft 7 1/2 in)
- Weight: 59 kg (130 lb)

Sport
- Sport: Athletics
- Event: Marathon

Achievements and titles
- Personal bests: Half-marathon: 1:04:18 (2002); Marathon: 2:17:43 (2003)

Ndabili Bashingili (born 28 December 1979 in Semitwe) is a Botswana marathon runner. Bashingili made his official debut for the 2004 Summer Olympics in Athens, where he placed twenty-fifth out of a hundred runners in the men's marathon, with a time of 2:18:09.

Four years after competing in his last Olympics, Bashingili qualified for the second time, as a 29-year-old, in the men's marathon at the 2008 Summer Olympics in Beijing. He successfully finished the race in fifty-ninth place by eight seconds behind Tanzania's Samson Ramadhani, with a time of 2:25:11.
