= Edwin Batshu =

Botswana politician

Edwin Jenamiso Batshu

Minister of Labour and Home Affairs
- In office 2009–2014
- President: Ian Khama

Minister Defence, Justice and Security Acting
- President: Ian Khama

Member of Parliament for Nkange
- In office 2009–2014
- Appointed by: Ian Khama
- Preceded by: Ambrose Masalila
- Succeeded by: Never Tshabang

Personal details
- Born: 21 June 1947 (age 79) Maitengwe
- Party: BDP
- Spouse: Chedza Batshu (m. October 1973)
- Children: Freddy Taziba Batshu (Married to Keitumentse Maano); Boitumelo Michelle Batshu (Married to Seitibatso Seitibatso); Baldwin Batendi Batshu; Tumelo Edward Ditsebe Batshu
- Parent(s): Batshu Mbaka (1900 - 1991); Kebawetse Batshu (1923 - )
- Profession: Police Officer, Member of Parliament, Cabinet Minister

Edwin Jenamiso Batshu (born June 21, 1947) is a Botswana politician who served in the government of Botswana as Minister of Labour and Home Affairs from 2011. A member of the ruling Botswana Democratic Party (BDP), Batshu is a member of Parliament in the National Assembly of Botswana and a member of SADC Parliamentary Forum Executive Committee from 2009 to 2011; previously, he was commissioner of Botswana Police from 2004 to 2007.

== Parliament ==
Edwin Batshu is a politician in Botswana. He was elected to the National Assembly in the October 2009 general election, representing the governing Botswana Democratic Party. Batshu was appointed as the Chairman of the Parliamentary oversight Committee on Directorate of Intelligence and Security. Batshu was a Member of SADC Parliamentary Forum Executive Committee from 2009 to 2011. Edwin Batshu was then appointed Minister of Labour and Home Affairs in November 2011. He was again appointed to the same post after the 2014 General election October 2014 general election, by Ian Khama in November 2014.

== Botswana Police Service ==
Edwin Batshu joined the Botswana Police Service in 1970 as a constable. He rose through the ranks to be appointed Commissioner of Police in May 2004. Batshu then retired at the age of 60, on the 21 June 2007. Batshu was the third Motswana to head Botswana Police Service since independence, the first being Simon Hirschfeld followed by Norman Moleboge. When he took over from his predecessor, Moleboge he insisted on transforming the police into an approachable community service that looked and perceived the community as clients who had to be served and respected. It was during his tenure that the police service introduced a special constable cadre.

== Other ==
While serving in the service, he studied a number of courses throughout the world. At a point, as Police Commissioner he headed the Intelligence unit, before the formation of the Directorate of Intelligence and Security in 2008. Batshu was appointed to the Customary Court of Appeal as a Judge in October 2007 a position he held till February 2008 when he joined politics.

== Awards ==
Batshu is former vice president of Botswana Football Association (1991-1992).
