= Mampori =

Mampori is a surname. Notable people with the surname include:

- Arnold Mampori (born 1991), Motswana footballer
- Kgosietsile Mampori, Motswana footballer
