= Botswana–North Korea relations =

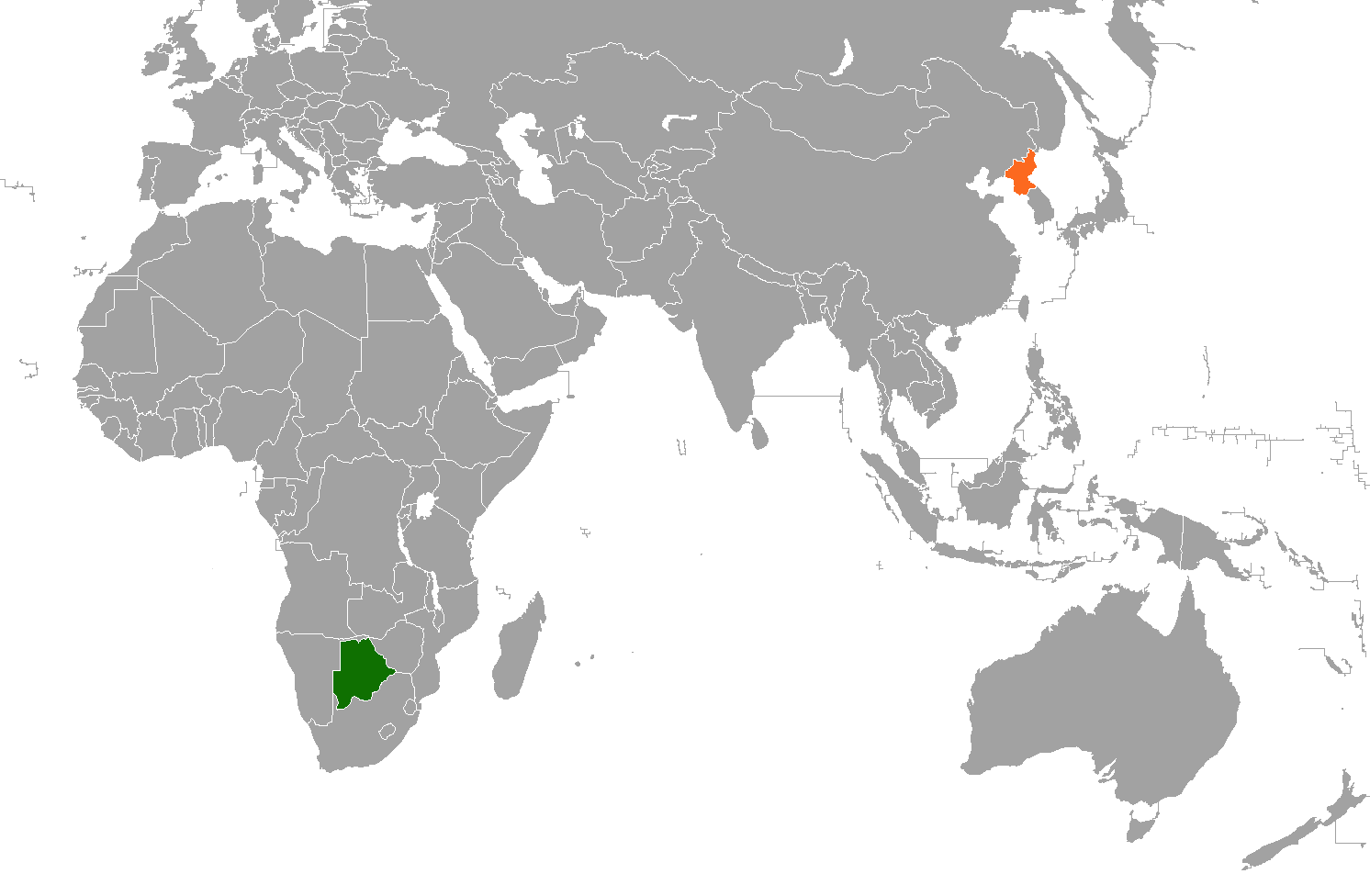

- Botswana: North Korea

Botswana–North Korea relations (Korean: 보쯔와나공화국-조선민주주의인민공화국 관계) refers to the current and historical relationship between Botswana and the Democratic People's Republic of Korea (DPRK), commonly known as North Korea. The two countries never maintained an embassy in their respective capitals since the suspension of diplomatic relations in February 2014.

== History ==
The two countries established diplomatic ties on 27 November 1974, during the Cold War. Botswana's first independent leader, President Seretse Khama, made a state visit to Pyongyang between 9 and 13 August 1976. During the visit, he and his wife met with Kim Il Sung, who arranged a banquet for them. Reportedly, Khama startled his hosts by playing billiards, at one point stretching across the pool table in a rather awkward position.

In the early 1980s, several North Korean martial arts instructors were commissioned to train the Botswana Police Service in unarmed combat. The North Koreans left Botswana shortly after they arrived, apparently due to inciting the constables against their superiors, and trying to convince them to seek a more democratic form of police work.

In modern times, North Korean constructors from the Mansudae Overseas Projects state company have built the Three Dikgosi Monument, located in Gaborone, depicting three tribal chiefs. The monument, inaugurated by President Festus Mogae in September 2005, has been the source of controversy. Botswana has also attempted to hire North Korean medical professionals to supplement their own.

The Botswana government suspended bilateral cooperation with the DPRK on 26 March 2013 due to concerns with the human rights situation in North Korea. On 20 February 2014 it subsequently continued this path, by fully terminating all diplomatic and consular relations with North Korea following a report by the United Nations Commission of Inquiry on Human Rights in North Korea. While condemning the government, Botswana expressed its "heartfelt sympathies" with the North Korean people.

In October 2014 it was reported that North Korean representatives had used derogatory racial language towards Charles Thembani Ntwaagae, Botswana's Permanent Representative to the United Nations, referring to him as "that black bastard".

In October 2015 while President Ian Khama was in Seoul, he was interviewed by Yonhap News and there proclaimed that they had no interest in diplomatic relations with North Korea any longer, referring to the violation of human rights and the menace to the peace of the Far East by the military dictatorship. On top of that, this pro-democratic president denounced government officials of North Korea. "North's leaders look like living in the Stone Age," Khama expressed his view on the country notorious for human rights violations.

== See also ==
- Foreign relations of Botswana
- Foreign relations of North Korea
