= Pilato (surname) =

Pilato is a surname of Italian origin. Notable people with the surname include:

- Herbie J Pilato (born 1960), American writer
- Joseph Pilato (1949–2019), American actor
- Kemmy Pilato (born 1989), Botswanan footballer
- Nikk Pilato (born 1972), conductor and educator, founder of the Wind Repertory Project

== See also ==
- Pilato (disambiguation)
