= Matobo =

Matobo can refer to:

- Matobo National Park in Zimbabwe
- Matobo District, an administrative division of Zimbabwe
- Matobo, Botswana, a village in Botswana

Fictional places:

- the Republic of Matobo, a fictional country from the movie The Interpreter
- Matobo, a fictional country from the Swedish comedy Morgan Pålsson – världsreporter ("Morgan Pålsson - world reporter").
