= Thabo Maruje Masunga III =

Thabo Masunga Maruje
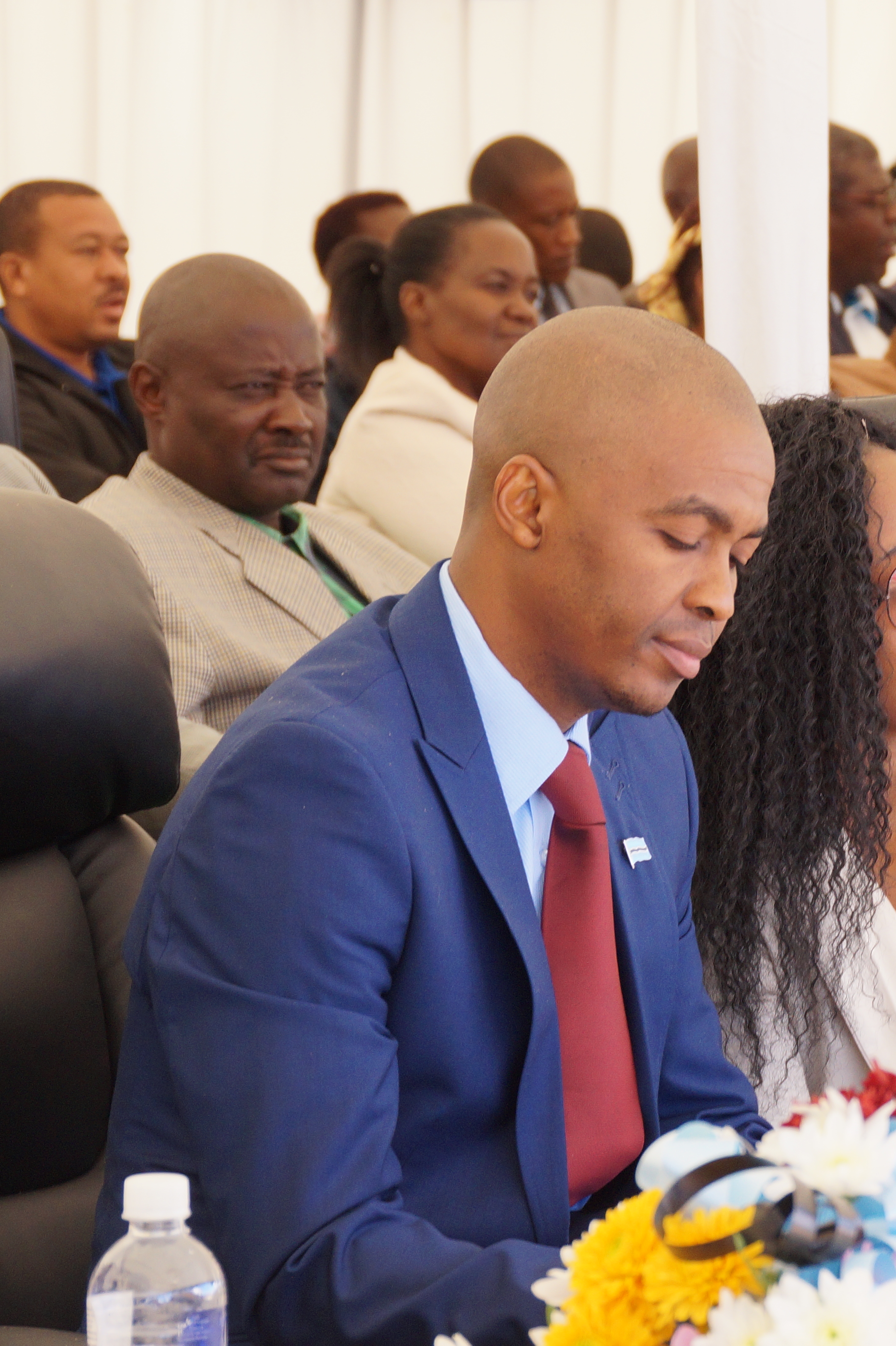
- Portrait of Chief Masunga Maruje at the World Information Society Day 2017
- Born: Thabo Maruje
- Title: Kgosi of the Kalanga
- Predecessor: Christopher Masunga
- Successor: Thabo Maruje Masunga

Thabo Masunga Maruje is the current chief of Masunga village, who took the title from his uncle Christopher Masunga. Thabo is the son to the late Robert Masunga, who was the first chief of Masunga village.

== Gallery of photos ==
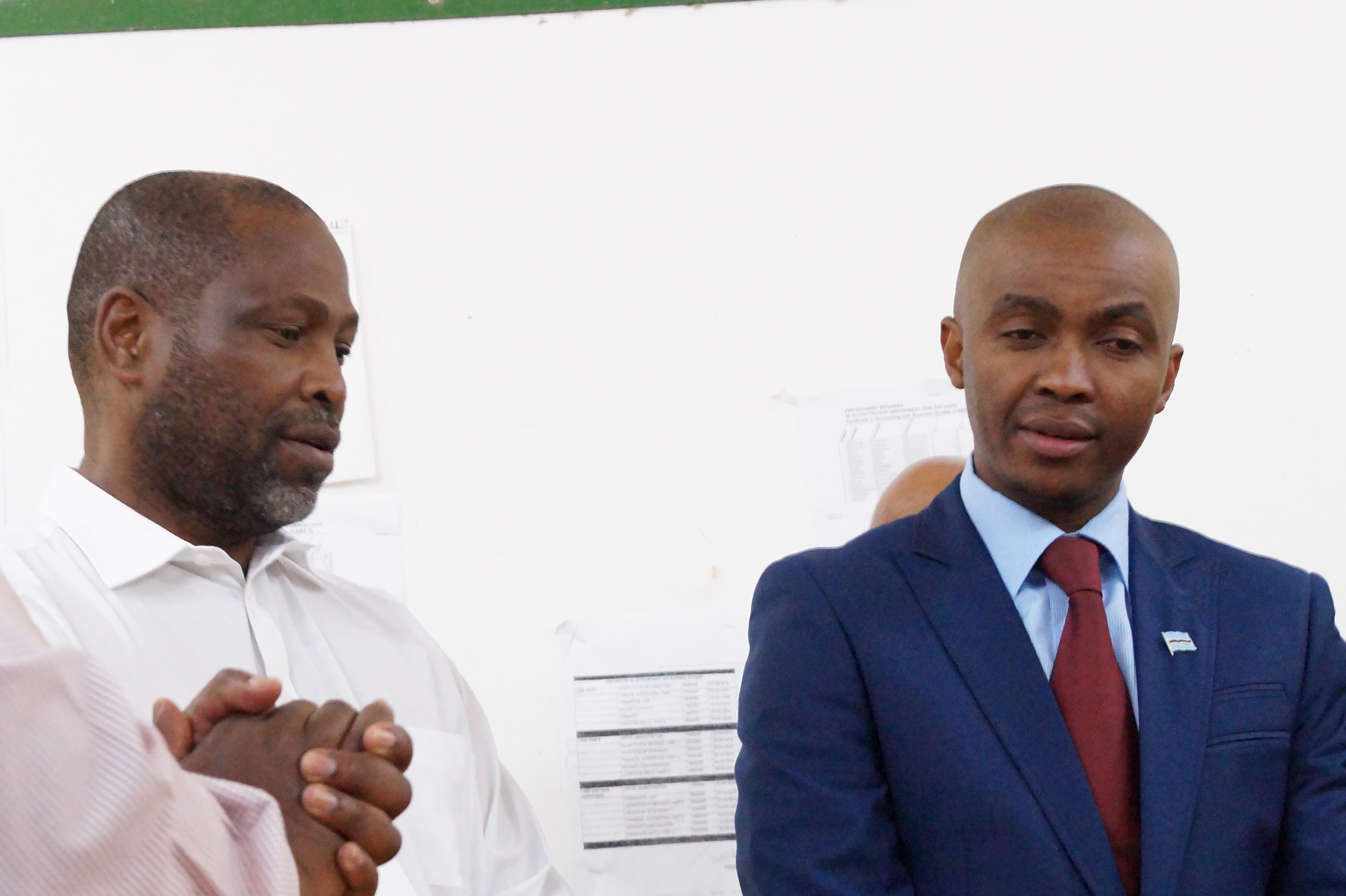

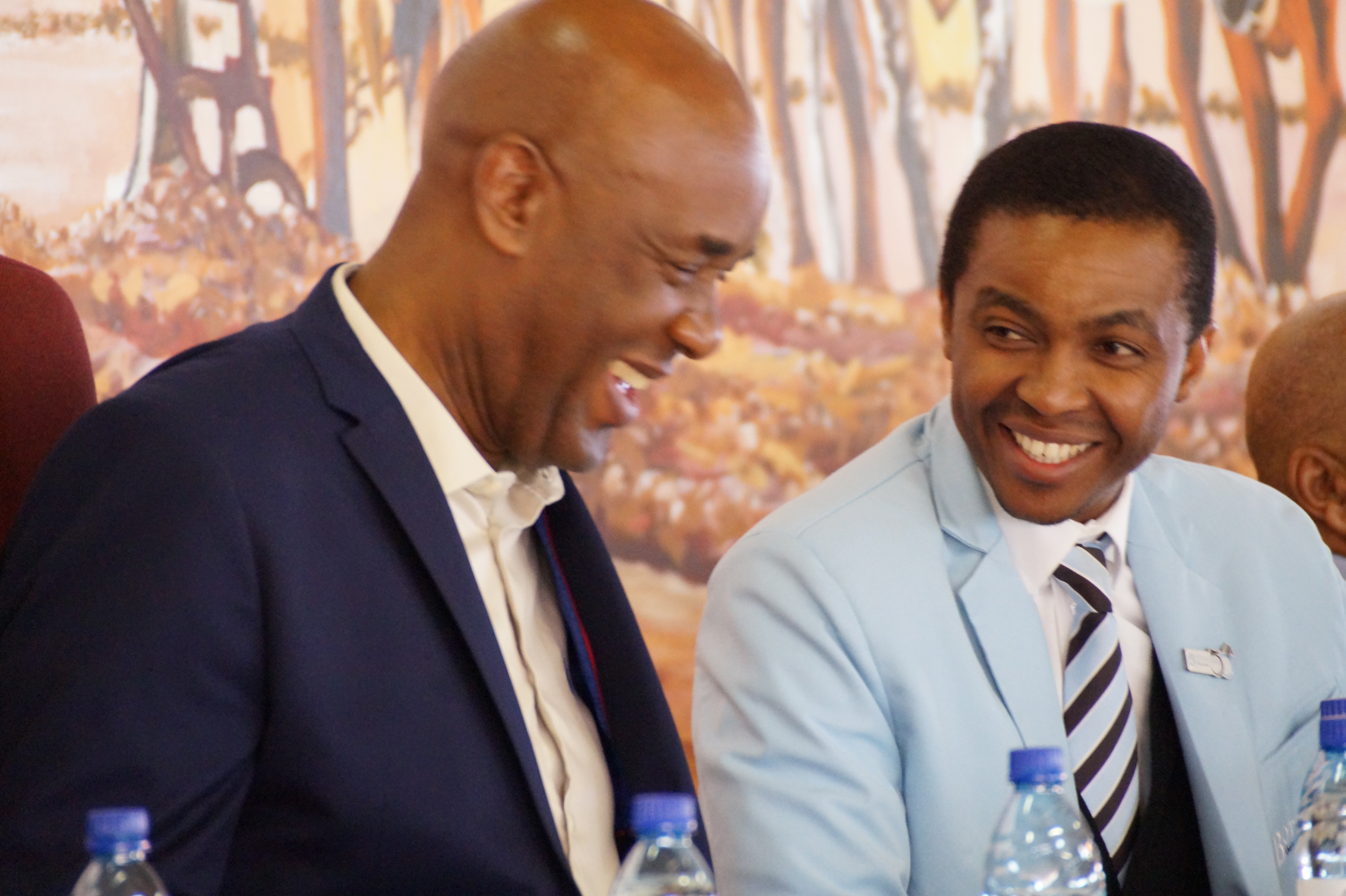
Thabo Masunga Maruje and Honourable Onkokame Kitso Mokaila

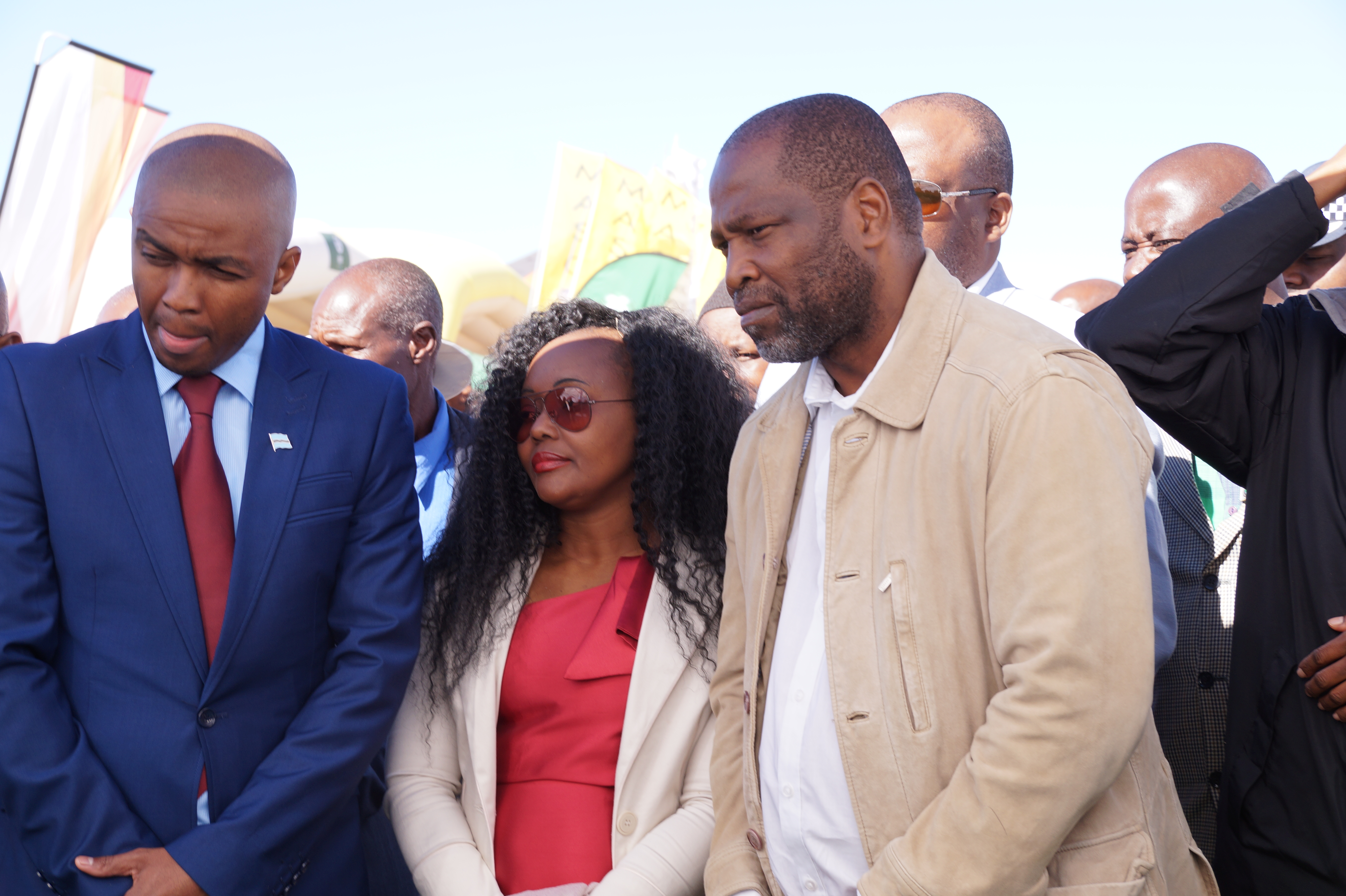
Chief Thabo Masunga Maruje III at the WTISD 2017, Visiting stalls
