= John Nswazwi =

John Madawo Nswazwi (1868-1960) was a chief of the BaKalanga Baka-Nswazwi. He was born in Nswazwi in then Bechuanaland in 1875. He ruled from 1910 to 1960 having succeeded his father, Kuswani Nswazwi (Nswazwi VII). He was exiled to Mafikeng in 1947 by the colonial government as a result of a conflict with the Bangwato regent Tshekedi Khama. After he was released In 1948, Chief Nswazwi went on exile to Rhodesia which later changed its name to Zimbabwe. He died on May 14, 1960. He was interred in Jetjeni but his remains were later transferred to Nswazwi village in 2002.

There is a mall in Franscistown that was named after him to honour him as well as a stature that is to be erected in his honour.
