= Obed Chilume =

Botswana politician (1933–2020)

Member of the National Assembly of Botswana from Nkange
- In office 1965–1999
- Preceded by: Position established
- Succeeded by: Ambrose Masalila

Personal details
- Born: Obed Itani Chilume; 8 August 1933
- Died: 30 August 2020 (aged 87)
- Party: Botswana Democratic Party

Obed Itani Chilume (8 August 1933 – 30 August 2020) was a Botswana politician. He represented Nkange in the National Assembly of Botswana from 1965 to 1999. He worked as the head of a school before joining politics and becoming one of the parliament's inaugural members. He was succeeded by Ambrose Masalila. The Obed Itani Chilume Stadium was named after him in 2019. Chilume died on 30 August 2020.
