= Charles Thembani Ntwaagae =

His Excellency Charles Thembani Ntwaagae
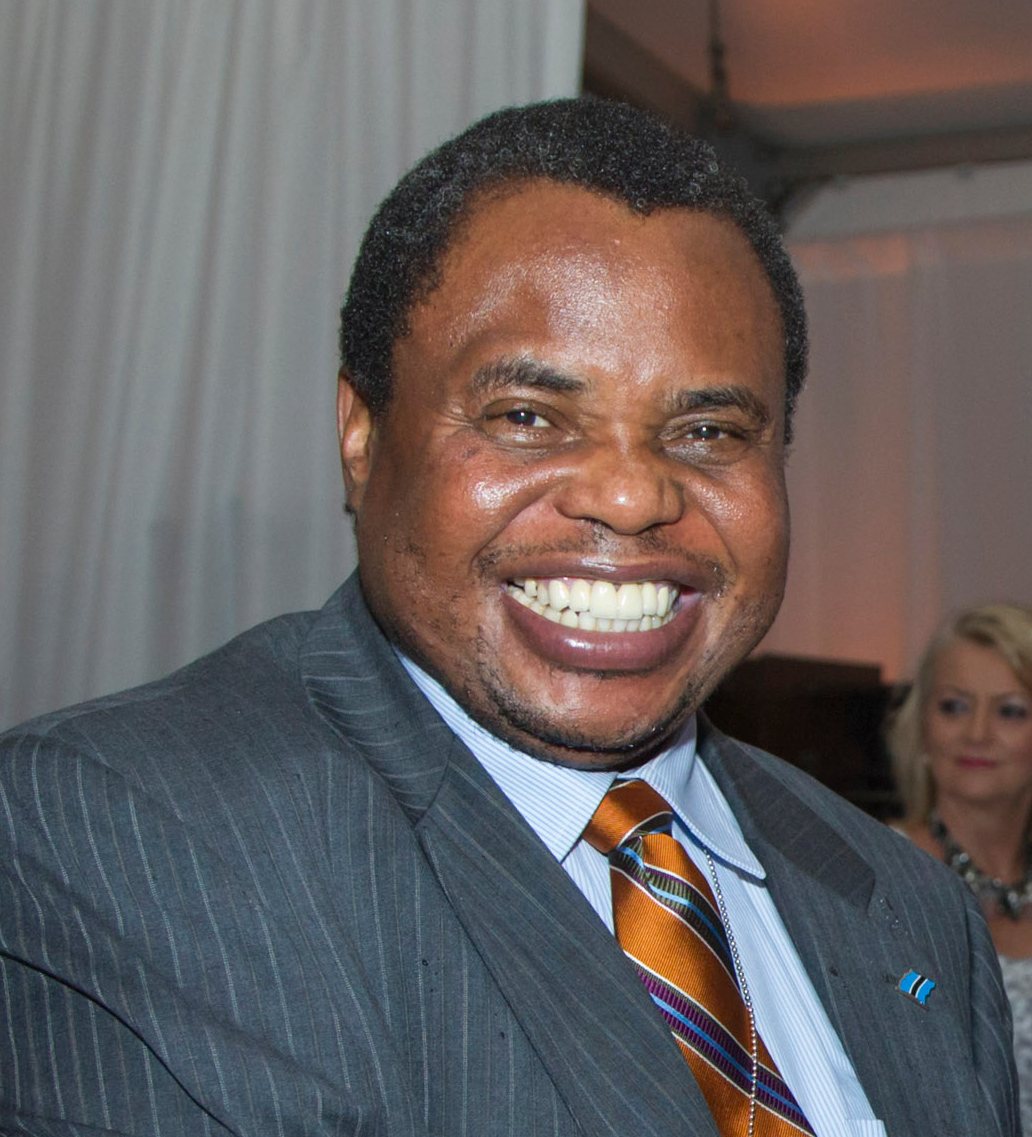
- Charles Thembani Ntwaagae in 2012

Permanent Representative to the United Nations for Botswana
- In office July 2008 – 26 October 2018
- Succeeded by: Collen Vixen Kelapile

Personal details
- Born: 1953 (age 72–73) Tutume, Botswana

Charles Thembani Ntwaagae (born 1953) is the Permanent Representative of Botswana to the United Nations, in office since July 2008 to until 2018.

== Education ==
Born in Tutume, Botswana, Ntwaagae holds a master's degree from Penn State, and a bachelor's degree from the University of Botswana and Swaziland.

== Career ==
Ntwaagae was Permanent Secretary in Botswana's Ministry of Foreign Affairs and International Cooperation prior to taking office at the United Nations. He has also served as Permanent Representative to the United Nations Office at Geneva, in Austria, and in Greece, for Botswana. Other offices he has held include Deputy Permanent Secretary in the Foreign Ministry; Chief Executive at the National Secretariat of the National Conservation Strategy (Coordinating) Agency; and Deputy Permanent Secretary in the Ministry of Local Government, Lands and Housing.

He now resides in Scarsdale, New York, with his wife and three children.

== Failed attempt to stop United Nations LGBT rights investigator ==
At the UN in 2016 Ntwaagae led a group of mostly African and Islamic nations plus Russia and China, who failed in an attempting to suspend the work of a UN-appointed Human Rights expert, Vitit Muntarbhorn of Thailand who was charged with investigating violence and discrimination based on sexual orientation and gender identity.

== See also ==
- List of current permanent representatives to the United Nations
