= Masunga =

- Village
- Location within Botswana
- Coordinates: 20°40′S 27°25′E
- Country: Botswana
- District: North-East District
- Elevation: 1,180 m (3,870 ft)

Population (2011)
  - Total: 5,696
- Time zone: GMT +2
- Climate: BSh

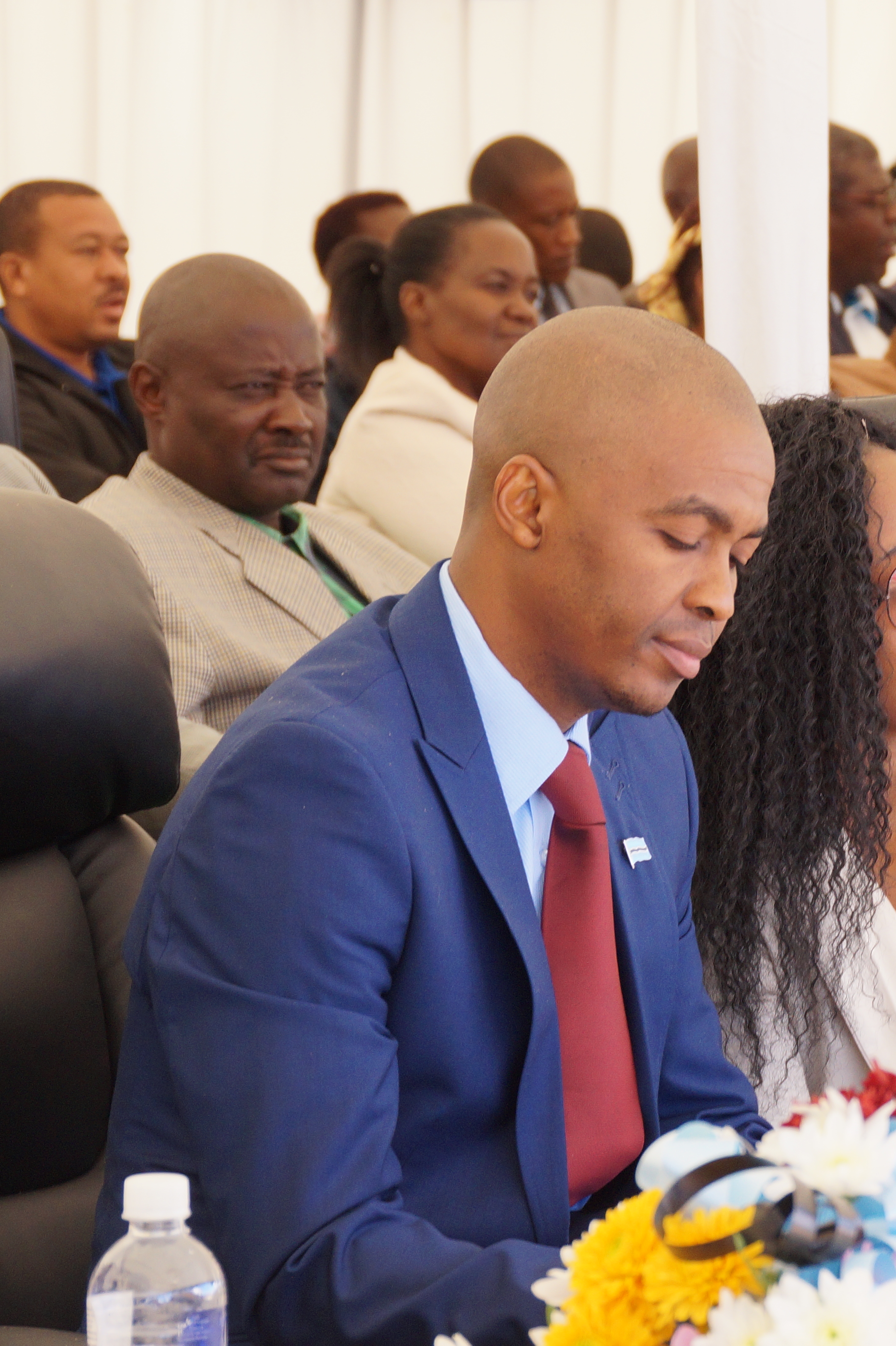
Chief Thabo Maruje Masunga III

Masunga /ˈmɑːsuŋɡʌ/ is a Bakalanga settlement in the North-East District of Botswana. The village is the Headquarters of the North East District. The nearest city is Francistown which is about 120 km (75 mi) away. The Chief of the region is Kgosi Thabo Maruje Masunga III, who took over from his uncle Christopher Masunga.

Near Masunga are the hills of Domboshaba, which hold a ruined outpost of the Kalanga Empire, more like Great Zimbabwe (Mutapa). It is one of the tourist attractions in Botswana where a yearly Ikalanga cultural ceremony takes place.

The language spoken in the North East Region is Kalanga, not Tswana like the rest of Botswana. Kalanga is closely related to Shona, the main language of Zimbabwe.

== Activities and attractions in Masunga ==
Things to do in Masunga include:

1. Near Masunga are the hills of Domboshaba, which hold a ruined output of the Kalanga Empire
2. Rock Art.
3. There is a sports complex that caters for different sporting activities.

== Schools in Masunga ==
Masunga Senior Secondary School

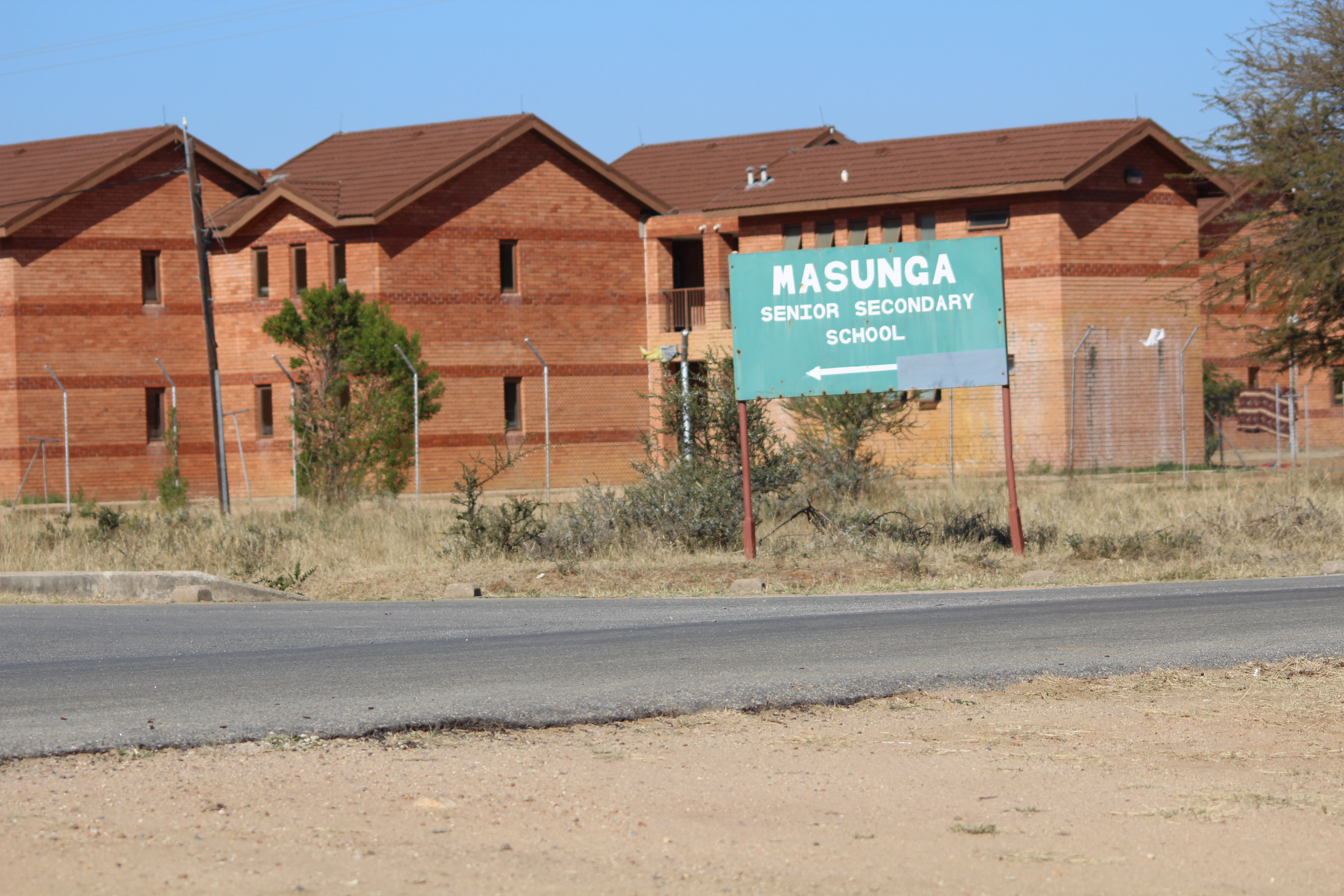
Masunga Senior Secondary School Teachers Residential Houses

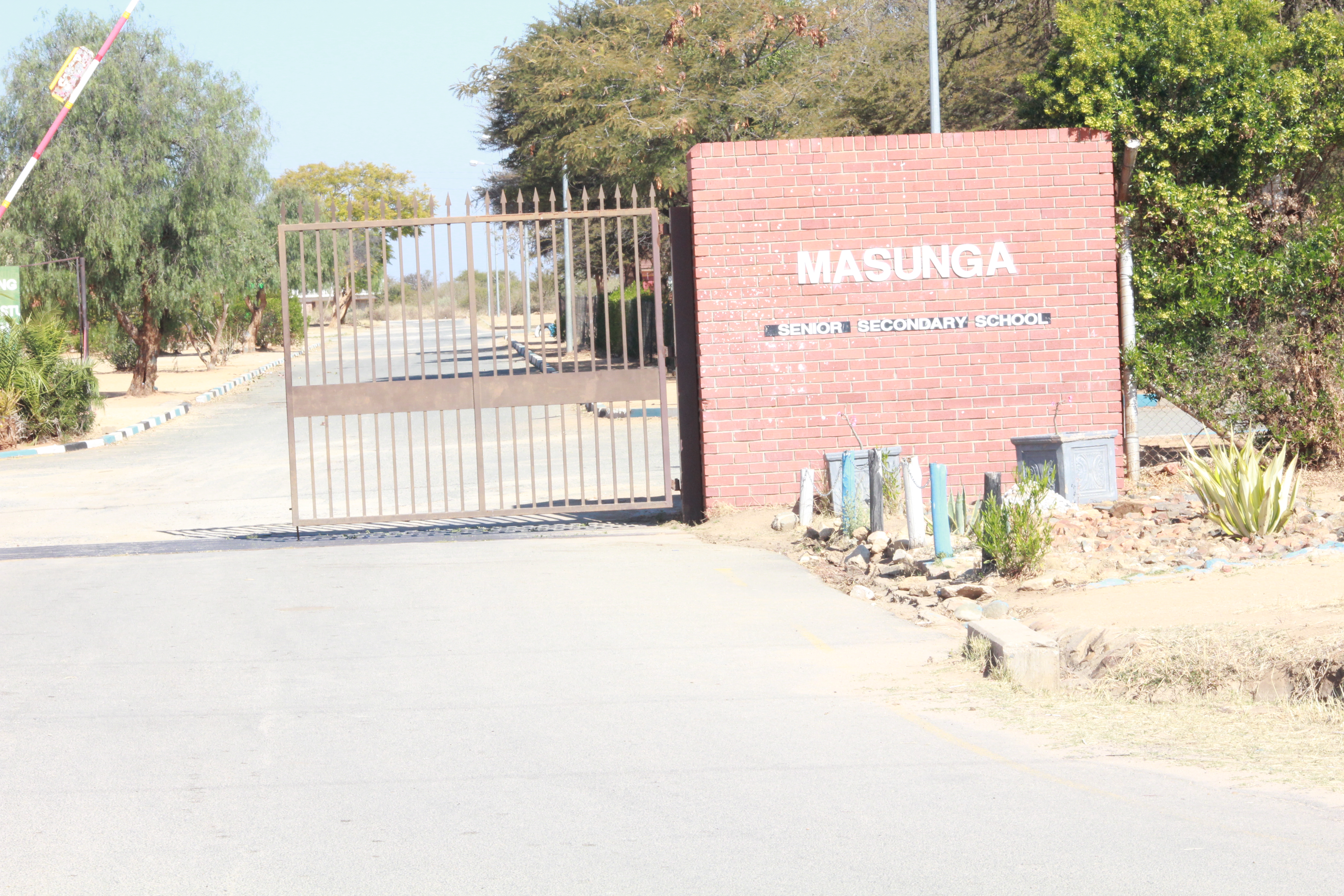
Masunga Senior Secondary School Front Entrance Gate

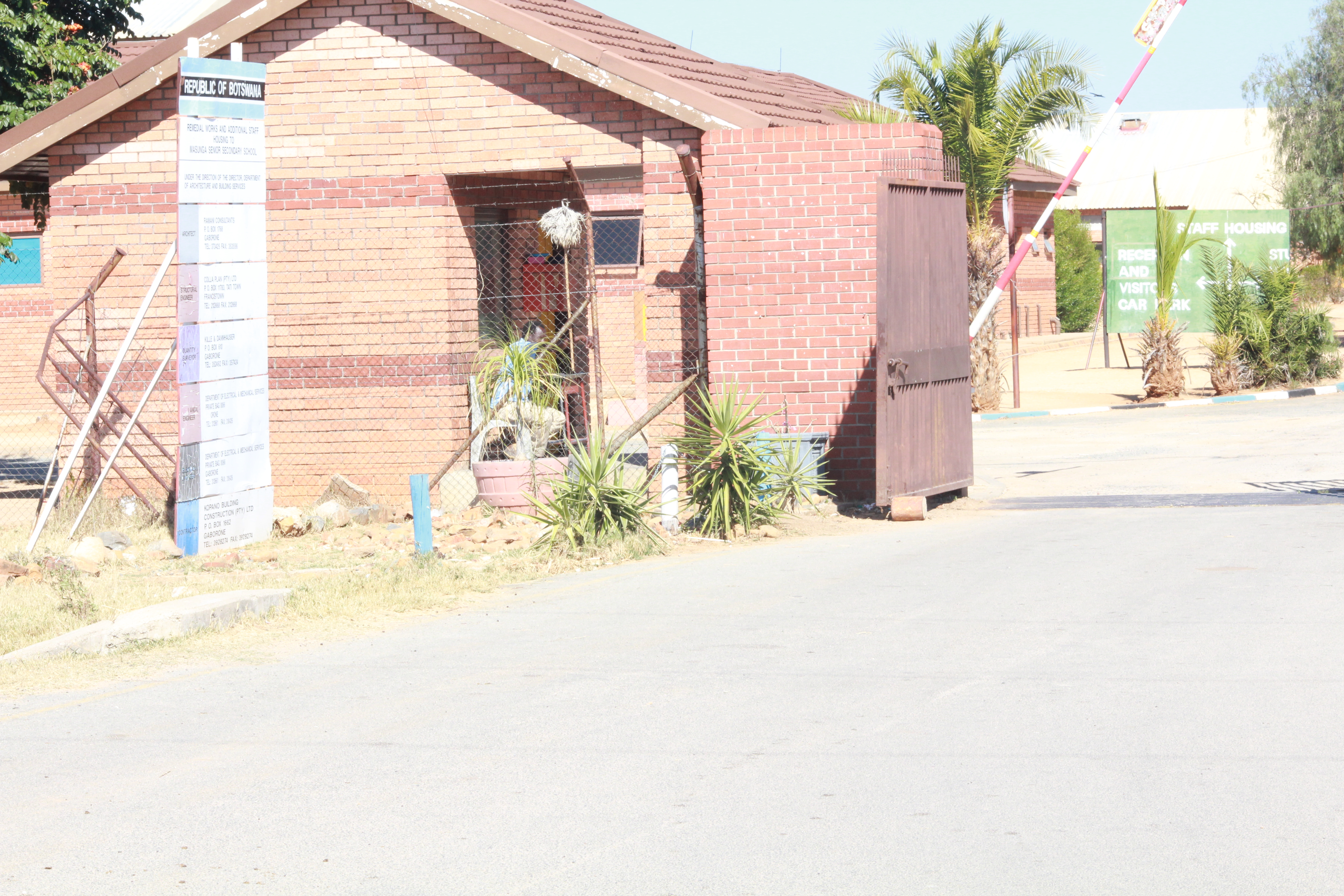
Masunga Senior Secondary School Security Guards building at the front gate

== See also ==
- Mathangwane Village
- Education in Botswana
