= Arnold Mampori =

Motswana footballer (born 1991)

Personal information
- Full name: Arnold Mampori
- Date of birth: 6 December 1991 (age 34)
- Place of birth: Marapong
- Height: 1.67 m (5 ft 5 1/2 in)
- Positions: Defensive midfielder; centreback

Team information
- Current team: Tonota FC
- Number: 14

Senior career*
Years	Team	Apps	(Gls)
2008–2012	Marapong United		
2012–2014	Uniao Flamengo Santos		
2014–2016	Nico United		
2016–2019	Mochudi Centre Chiefs		
2019–	Township Rollers		

International career^{‡}
2016–	Botswana	2	(0)
- * Club domestic league appearances and goals as of 29 August 2009 ‡ National team caps and goals as of 4 October 2019

Arnold Mampori (born 6 December 1991) is a Motswana footballer playing for Township Rollers in the Botswana Premier League and the Botswana national football team.
