= Njelele Shrine =

Cave in Zimbabwe

- Interactive map of Njelele Shrine
- Location: Matobo Hills
- Coordinates: 20°33′00″S 28°30′29″E
- Geology: granite copje

The Njelele Shrine or Shrine of Mabweadziva is a cave which is of significant spiritual importance in Zimbabwe; pilgrims visit it annually for ritual purposes prior to the beginning of the rain season. The shrine is inside a cave that is located in the Matobo Hills (which is a world heritage center) in the Khomola communal area approximately 100 kilometres south of Bulawayo, Zimbabwe's second largest city. Vendas used to take the black cow once a year to Matopo(Matovha) in appropriations of the rain. The process was stopped by the White's administration when movements of animals across the Limpopo (Vhembe) river was banned. The shrine is found in a solid granite kopje which is not different from a plethora of others that are in the vicinity. The outthrust of this shrine is situated on a mountain range that runs westwards. The shrine has "three naturally hidden entrances that wind up and down among overhang granite boulders." The cave is not the main feature of Njelele but the gallery in the rocks. It is also endowed with a number of small tunnels, which lead to the shrine's various chambers from the narrow entrance which is between two tall rocks. Njelele is mainly known as the rain-making shrine however, it is visited for other purposes such as asking for forgiveness after society's wrongdoings, asking for cures for human and domesticated animals diseases. An assortment of skulls and horns of big game, iron hoes, clay pots containing water, cloth and beads, piles of tobacco, hatchets, and spears are kept in one of the caves at Njelele. Some scholars believe that these were objects offered to the presiding deity. In the 1960s and 70s (period of the liberation struggle in Zimbabwe), this shrine was consulted by politicians and liberation fighters. One notable member who visited the Shrine was Joshua Mqabuko Nkomo the then leader of ZIPRA and former Zimbabwean vice president. It is believed that some time ago, a voice came from the Njelele rocks instructing those who would have visited it on what to do; even Nkomo acknowledged this in his autobiography The Story of My Life. The voice was last heard in 1974; it disappeared due to the desecration of the shrine.

== Name and etymology ==
The Shrine is popularly known as Njelele, a Tjikalanga term which refers to a certain type of birds. In Shona it is known as Mabweadziva which means the place of spring waters. This explains why Njelele is believed to be the rain-making shrine. Another Tjikalanga name for the shrine is “Malindidzimu”, which means “The Sacred Place for Our Ancestors”. Njelele is also known as Matonjeni.

== Description ==
Njelele is found on the Matobo (Matovha) Granite which is believed to be over 2.65 billion years old. The intrusive igneous rock which has an irregular oval body has a maximum east–west and north–south dimensions of almost 100 km and 30 km respectively. The shrine has "three naturally hidden entrances that wind up and down among overhang granite boulders."

== Mythology ==
The Njelele Shrine is believed to be a very sacred place. As such there are rules that must be followed if one wants to visit this site. The personal presence of Mudzimu or Mwari (the Almighty being) was indicated by his voice. It was believed that it was a taboo to point fingers at the shrine as bad omen would follow whoever pointed their fingers to the shrine. The secret behind the respect accorded places like Njelele lies in the fact that Bantu people believed that spirits resided in caves, mountains, forests, hollow trees, and many other secluded environments. Pilgrims who visited the Njelele shrine to ask for rains were to be accompanied by the custodian of the Shrine who was believed to have the power and purity to speak to Mudzimu or Mwari. During such ceremonies traditional beer would be brought by pre-pubescent girls and post-menopausal women and placed outside the entrance. Pre-pubescent girls and post-menopausal women were chosen so that the purity of the shrine would not be defiled by women who still experienced their menstrual periods. The spokesperson/custodian would, while standing a few meters away from the shrine, then clap hands and sing praises to Mudzimu/Mwari asking for rains. After a certain amount of time of clapping and praising a voice would then be heard advising the visitors on what to do in order to get rains. The shrine can only be visited during August and September (before the rain season). During the time of the last moon, known as elimnyama in Ndebele, people are not allowed to visit the shrine. Unsanctioned visits are believed to disturb the peace of the shrine and result in poor rains being experienced.

== Discovery and improvement ==
Conflictual oral traditions have made it difficult to ascertain when Njelele was first established in the Matobo(Matovha) Hills. Based on the Rozvi oral tradition, Njelele originated in about "the 14th century when the Mbire ethnic group migrated from around Lake Tanganyika southwards and eventually settled at Great Zimbabwe, a proto Shona settlement occupied between 1250-1450 AD." Some scholars believe that the Mwari (Mwali) cult could have been established at Great Zimbabwe while other scholars thought the establishment of the Mwari (Mwali) shrine at Njelele could be related to "the shift of the Rozvi administrative power from Great Zimbabwe to the Matobo(Matovha) Hils." Before the Ndebele adopted the Mwari (Mwali) cult, it had been a Shona institution. Oral tradition recalls that Lobengula kept some of the Mwari (Mwali) cult spirit mediums at his Bulawayo settlement so as to seek counsel from them during crises .

A different version of the oral tradition states that the shrine was founded in the Matobo (Matovha) hills when the Great Zimbabwe experienced a religious squabble. During this dispute a breakaway group of traditional priests deserted Great Zimbabwe and established the Mwari (Mwali) cult in Matobo(Matovha). Afterwards, several other cult centers including Zwalo and Dula were also established in the vicinity. Similar traditional institutions were in existence in the south-western parts of Zimbabwe, among the Venda and Kalanga people. Therefore, in the 19th century, priests were selected from Venda and Kalanga families who were deeply engrossed in the Mwari cult tradition.

== Management ==
The Njelele Shrine is currently overseen by Solifa Ncube (popularly known as Khulu Thobela (Thovhela) which means Grandpa Thobela/Thovhela) a traditional priest who is recognized by the community. The Shrine is open to anyone who is of the required age and gender, who comes at the required time and follows the required procedures. In the past, several parties clashed over control of Njelele. On one hand the government, on several occasions, tried to declare the shrine a National Monument ( between 1960 -1980 and between 1980 - 2000). On the other hand, Sitwanyana Ncube, the Ndlovu brothers (particularly Mayabu), and Ngcathu Ncube also claimed custodianship of the shrine. The people refused to let Njelele be declared a National Monument as this could have led to the suppression of their decisions over the shrine as is the case with other areas of national interest like National Parks that have made it difficult for locals to visit for free. Conflicts among the three individuals were difficult to resolve as they all had conflicting values and goals for the shrine. They represented values carried by different groups who had personal connections with the shrine. The fight for custodianship and priesthood resulted in the flight of Ngcathu Ncube who relocated to Silawa which is 50 kilometers away from Njelele after her home was gutted by a bolt of lightning. She died in 2000, a year after relocating leaving Sitwanyana Ncube and Mayabu Ndlovu to continue the battle. Sitwanyana was then evicted by the Zimbabwe's Liberation War Veterans Association (ZLWVA) who accused him of causing problems over the custodianship and priesthood of Njelele. They also accused him of killing his ex-wife Ngcathu Ncube whose death was mysterious. After being evicted, Sitwanyana Ncube spent months camping by the roadside near Njelele. He eventually died in 2006 leaving David Ndlovu as the sole custodian and priest of Njelele. There are no more known conflicts of the custodianship and priesthood of Njelele.

== See also ==
- Chinhoyi Caves
- Balancing rocks of Zimbabwe
