= Shona languages =

Bantu language family

Shona
- Geographic distribution: Zimbabwe, Mozambique, Botswana
- Linguistic classification: Niger–Congo?: Atlantic–Congo; Volta-Congo; Benue–Congo; Bantoid; Southern Bantoid; Bantu (Zone S.10); Southern Bantu; Shona
- Proto-language: Proto-Shona

Language codes
- Glottolog: shon1250

The Shona languages (also called the Shonic group) are a clade of Bantu languages coded Zone S.10 in Guthrie's classification.

== Classification ==
According to Nurse & Philippson (2003), the languages form a valid node. They are:

- Shona
  - Eastern Shona group
    - Ndau (S.15)
  - Central Shona group
    - Korekore (S.11) and Tawara
    - Zezuru (S.12)
    - Manyika (S.13) and Tewe
    - Karanga (S.14)
  - Western Shona group
    - Kalanga (S.16)
    - Nambya

Glottolog classiefies the Shona languages as follows:

- Shona
  - Core Shona
    - Ndau
    - Plateau Shona
      - Central Shona
        - Shona
        - Tawara
      - Manyika
      - Tewe
  - kalanga-Nambya
    - Kalanga
    - Nambya
  - Dema (unclassified shona)

In the 1920s, the Rhodesian administration was faced with the challenge of preparing schoolbooks and other materials in the various languages and dialects and requested the recommendation of the South African linguist Clement Doke. Based on his 1931 report, Standard Shona was developed from the Central Shona varieties. Because of the presence of the capital city in the Zezuru region, that variety has come to dominate in Standard Shona.

Some classifications include the Shonic group in Southern Bantu, with the other Zone S languages; others treat it separately.

== History ==
The homeland of Proto-Shona was in an area between southern Zimbabwe and northern South Africa (Limpopo province). According to Christopher Ehret, Shona-speaking territory at some point in time extended northward to the Zambezi in Mozambique and possibly even beyond it in some places. The former presence of these now extinct Shona peoples, can be found in the large variety of Shona loanwords in the Nyasa languages (such as Chewa) which currently dominate the Lower Zambezi, and even in the Chuwabu language (a Makua language).

Most striking are the wide occurrence of the uniquely Shona word for head, musoro, and at least three other loanwords in core vocabulary in the Zambezi River dialects: Shona zamu "breast" only in one dialect spoken near the Shire just north of the Zambezi, as lizamwe; godo "bone" variously as -gogodo and -godo in different of the lowland dialects; and -cena "white" not only in the Nyanja-related dialects but also in Chuabo, a Makua-related language spoken on the north side of the Zambezi delta. The type of basic words adopted can best be explained by a history of Nyanja-speaking communities spreading over and absorbing established Shona populations

— Christopher Ehret,
