= Senete =

Village in Central District, Botswana

Coordinates: 20°19′37″S 27°7′34″E

Location of Senete

Senete is a village in Central District of Botswana. It is located close to the border with Zimbabwe, and has both primary and secondary schools and a health clinic. Senete has a rich cultural heritage where the Bakalanga tribe are also found. The burying people in the hill caves by the Masokandolo people. Senete village is situated twenty kilometres from Tutume village and about 120 km from Francistown. The population was 2,523 in 2001 census.
