= Pilato =

Pilato may refer to:

- Pilato (surname), surname of Italian origin
- Pilato (rapper), the stage name of Zambian singer Fumba Chama

== Places ==
Spain

- Casa de Pilatos ("Pilate's House"), an Andalusian palace in Seville, Spain, which serves as the permanent residence of the Dukes of Medinaceli

Italy

- Lago di Pilato, a lake in the Province of Ascoli Piceno, Marche, Italy.
- Grotte di Pilato, ("Grottoes of Pilate"), a complex system of tunnels and pools in the island of Ponza, Italy
