= Daniel Kwele =

Motswana politician

Daniel Kwele was a Motswana politician, and a co-founder of the Botswana National Front, along with Kenneth Koma.

== Biography ==
Kwele eventually became a member of parliament, a cabinet minister and joined the Botswana Democratic Party. He died in 1991 and was interred in Francistown, where, on the 50th anniversary of his party's founding, there was a jubilee.
