= Goshwe =

Coordinates: 20°30′32″S 27°12′10″E

Location of Goshwe

Goshwe is a village in Central District of Botswana. It is located close to the border with Zimbabwe and has a primary school called Goshwe primary school and a junior secondary school. The population was 1,156 in 2001 census.

The village is centred on livestock keeping and field cultivation. Goshwe is also known for its beautiful natural fauna and flora. It also has hidden rock paintings of which many have not discovered. Goshwe is divided into two main parts; the village central were there is a kgotla, primary school and secondary school. homesteads also surround these government infrucstrucrures. The other part is Chilokoti where most of agriculture takes place.

Goshwe is located 20 km away from a village called Tutume, and upon YouTube arrival at the village you will notice the bleating of goats and sheep

A sheep baa
A sheep bleat

and mooing of cows.
