= Kemmy Pilato =

Motswana footballer

Personal information
- Full name: Kemmy Pilato
- Date of birth: 18 May 1989 (age 37)
- Place of birth: Tutume, Botswana
- Height: 1.74 m (5 ft 8 1/2 in)
- Position: Midfielder

Team information
- Current team: BMC Lobatse
- Number: 21

Senior career*
Years	Team	Apps	(Gls)
2007–2010	Extension Gunners		
2011–	BMC Lobatse		

International career
2009	Botswana	1	(0)
- * Club domestic league appearances and goals

Kemmy Pilato (born 18 May 1989) is a Motswana footballer who currently plays for BMC Lobatse.

== Career ==
=== Club ===
He left Extension Gunners on 9 July 2011 and joined League rival Botswana Meat Commission FC.

=== International ===
He won one cap for the Botswana national football team in 2009.
