= Nambya language =

Bantu language of northwest Zimbabwe and Botswana

Nambya
- Nanzva
- Native to: Zimbabwe, Botswana
- Ethnicity: Nambya people
- Native speakers: (100,000 cited 2000–2004)
- Language family: Niger–Congo?: Atlantic–Congo; Volta-Congo; Benue–Congo; Bantoid; Southern Bantoid; Bantu; Shona languages; Kalanga-Nyamba; Nambya

Official status
- Official language in: Zimbabwe (both Kalanga and Nambya)

Language codes
- ISO 639-3: nmq – Nambya
- Glottolog: namb1291
- ELP: Nambya

Nambya, Nambiya or Nanzwa/Nanzva, is a Bantu language spoken by the Nambya people. It is spoken in northwestern Zimbabwe, particularly in the town of Hwange, with a few speakers in northeastern Botswana. It is either classified as a dialect of Kalanga or as a closely related language. The Zimbabwean constitution, in particular the Education Act, as amended in 1990, recognises Nambya and Kalanga as separate indigenous languages.

== Phonology ==
Nambya is a tonal language. It has a simple 5 vowel system and a typical Bantu consonant-vowel (CV) syllable structure. The language has onsetless syllables, but these are restricted to the word-initial position, making Nambya typical of the Southern Bantu languages.

=== Vowels ===
	Front	Central	Back
Close	i		u
Mid	e		o
Open		a	

== Morphology ==
Like many Bantu languages, Nambya has a highly agglutinative morphology.
