= Changate =

Village in Botswana

Coordinates: 20°24′51″S 27°15′41″E

Location of Changate

Changate is a village in Central District of Botswana.

== Location ==
It is located close to the border with Zimbabwe.

== Education ==
It has a primary school.

== Healthcare ==
It has a clinic.

== Population ==
The population was 1169, in 2011 census.
