= Xhumo =

Village in Botswana

Coordinates: 21°9′46″S 24°36′32″E

Location of Xhumo

Xhumo is a village in Central District of Botswana. It is located close to Makgadikgadi Pan, and the population was 1,684 in 2011 census.
