= Matobo, Botswana =

Coordinates: 20°33′42″S 27°6′44″E

Location of Matobo

Matobo is a village in Central District of Botswana. It is located 10 km south-east of Tutume, close to the border with Zimbabwe. The village has a primary school and the population was 1,314 in 2001 census.
