= Semitwe =

Coordinates: 20°56′27″S 27°4′49″E

Location of Semitwe

Semitwe is a village in the Central District of Botswana. The village is located50 kilometres (31 mi) north-west of Francistown, and it has a primary school. The population was 537 in the 2001 census.
