= Nswazwi =

Village in Botswana

Coordinates: 20°39′55″S 27°13′8″E

Location of Nswazwi

Nswazwi is a small village in the Central District of Botswana. Located close to the border with Zimbabwe, it is named after the great chief John Nswazwi of Bakalanga people (Kalanga speakers). The population was 1,741 at the 2001 census.

The village has a long history beginning all the way from the era of the Munomutapa Empire.

The village has primary school, Nswazwi Primary, campsite, a lodge, a few guest houses, post office, a kgotla and a secondary school called Madawu Community Junior School, a clinic, a brigade development trust called, Nswazwi brigade being the largest in Botswana. The village is self contained. The village got attention of the country when the kalangas who had settled in Zimbabwe together with their chief John Nswazwi were repatriated in the year 2006.
