= Kalanga language =

Bantu language of Zimbabwe and Botswana

Kalanga
- TjiKalanga/Ikalanga
- Native to: Zimbabwe, Botswana
- Region: Southwest parts of Zimbabwe Central, North Central and Northeast Botswana
- Ethnicity: Kalanga people
- Native speakers: 700,000 in Zimbabwe, 850,000 in Botswana (2012-2015)
- Language family: Niger–Congo?: Atlantic–Congo; Benue–Congo; Southern; Bantu; Shona group (S.10); Kalanga

Official status
- Official language in: Zimbabwe (both Kalanga and Nambya) Botswana-recognized language nationally

Language codes
- ISO 639-3: Either: kck – Kalanga nmq – Nambya
- Glottolog: kala1405
- Guthrie code: S.16
- Linguasphere: 99-AUT-ai

Kalanga, or TjiKalanga (in Zimbabwe), is a Bantu language spoken by the Kalanga people in Botswana and Zimbabwe which belongs to the Shonic (Shona-Nyai) branch of the Bantu languages, within the Niger-Congo languages. It has an extensive phoneme inventory, which includes palatalised, velarised, aspirated and breathy-voiced consonants, as well as whistled sibilants.

Kalanga is recognized as an official language by the Zimbabwean Constitution of 2013 and is taught in schools in areas where its speakers predominate. The iKalanga language is closely related to the Nambya, TshiVenda, and KheLobedu languages of Zimbabwe and South Africa.

== Classification and varieties ==
Linguists place Kalanga (S.16 in Guthrie's classification) and Nambya (in the Hwange region of Zimbabwe) as the western branch of the Shona group (or Shonic, or Shona-Nyai) group of languages, collectively coded as S.10.

Kalanga has a dialectal variation between its Botswana and Zimbabwean varieties and they use slightly different orthographies. Historically, Wentzel mentioned Kalanga (proper) and Lilima (Tjililima/Humbe) on the west.

=== TTjiLilima ===
TjiLilima is the Kalanga language dialect popularly used in everyday speech as well as in a lot of documentation made and developed in Botswana. The use and rise of this specific dialect was brought on by the population group that uses it. This population group includes people who come from the Southern parts of the Tutume district, the Tonota district as well as those from the country's North east district. Combined, the people of these districts speak the TjiLilima dialect and refer to themselves as either BaLilima or BaWhumbe. This dialect has also managed to spill into the diaspora communities of Bulilima and Mangwe districts because of the closeness of the two (2) groups of people and communities with each other. The Bulilima-Mangwe area used to be a base for the Tjikalanga proper dialect (Tjindondondo), but the dialect is now facing being overshadowed by the TjiLilima.

=== TjiGwizi ===
This dialect derives its name from the settlement patterns of the language users who (unlike other Bakalanga people) preferred to settle where there are a lot of rivers (gwizi) and therefore adopting the name.The following most popular dialect of the Kalanga people is the TjiGwizi (sometimes referred to as TjiDeti). Like the TjiLilima dialect, TjiGwizi was also made popular by its many speakers and users who are found in many villages and towns and also occupy large areas of land in present-day Botswana. This dialect is spoken and used in the northern parts of the Tutume District as well as all over the Boteti area, but there is not a lot of documentation written and produced in this specific dialect.

=== TjiTalaunda ===
The third Kalanga language dialect worth noting is the dialect of the Batalaunda people who are also found in Botswana as well as in the country of Zimbabwe. In Botswana their majority population can be found in Serowe and Mahalapye villages where they have been living alongside the Ngwato tribe and other tribes for many years. In Zimbabwe this dialect can be found in the Matobo District as well as the Gwanda District. TjiTalaunda has striking similarities with both TjiGwizi and TjiLilima despite them being over 200 kilometres away from each other. The Batalaunda pride themselves in being the only Kalanga tribe using a singular totem which is the Moyo (heart).

=== TjiNanzwa ===
The BaNanzwa get their name from the Kalanga word Nanzwa which refers to the direction north. This basically means that they are the Bakalanga tribe who are found north of all other Bakalanga peoples and tribes. They speak the Nanzwa dialect (sometimes treated as a different language in its own right). The language has slightly different pronunciations from the other dialects because of it mixing with other tribes they stay with. This Kalanga dialect is also spoken in other parts of Zimbabwe particularly the Hwange area where a huge number of the Bananzwa reside and have been for over a hundred years. TjiNanzwa is feared to be close to extinction because a very large number of the language users are adopting the three above mentioned dialects.

=== TjiKalanga proper (Tjindondondo) ===
The last popular Kalanga dialect is the Tjindondondo dialect which is the main dialect of communication amongst the Bakalanga of that area. It is by far the largest, most spoken and most documented of the Kalanga language dialects holding a huge presence in both countries. Despite all the other language being used in different areas, Tjindondondo is considered to be more ancient to the others and more original since it has many similarities with all the others and can be understood by all the other speakers of the Kalanga dialects. This dialect is more widely used in the Bulilimamangwe districts as well as the Tsholotsho area. A lot of work has since been done and made on this dialect and the language has since then been resuscitated in schools in the country of Zimbabwe where it is an official language.

The Kalanga language used to have many other dialects which seem to have gone or are going into disuse because the speakers of those dialects saw it better to adopt the dialects of the popular ones. Such dialects are the Nyai (Rozvi), Lemba (Remba), Lembethu (Rembethu), Twamamba (Xwamamba), Pfumbi, Jaunda (Jawunda, Jahunda), and †Romwe, †Peri.

The Jawunda dialect was about to become extinct, but there are collaborations underway to help resuscitate the dialect to its former status, especially in its native district of Gwanda in Zimbabwe. The natives in partnership with the government are helping the minority dialects get noticed and supported.

== Phonology ==
=== Consonants ===
		Labial		Dental		Alveolar		Post- alveolar		Palatal	Velar		Glottal
		plain	alveolar	plain	lab.	plain	lab.	plain	lab.	Palatal	plain	lab.	Glottal
Plosive	voiceless	p		t̪			(tʷ)				k	kʷ	
Plosive	voiced	b		d̪		d	dʷ				ɡ	ɡʷ	
Plosive	prenasal	ᵐb				ⁿd					ᵑɡ	ᵑɡʷ	
Plosive	aspirated	pʰ		t̪ʰ		tʰ	tʰʷ				kʰ	kʰʷ	
Plosive	breathy	pʱ				tʱ						kʷʱ	
Plosive	ejective					(tʼ)							
Affricate	voiceless		p͡s	t̪͡s̪				t͡ʃ					
Affricate	voiced		b͡z	d̪͡z̪	d̪͡z̪ʷ			d͡ʒ				b͡ɡ	
Affricate	prenasal							ⁿd͡ʒ					
Affricate	aspirated			t̪͡s̪ʰ	t̪͡s̪ʰʷ							p͡kʰ	
Affricate	breathy			t̪͡s̪ʱ				t͡ʃʱ					
Affricate	ejective							t͡ʃʼ					
Fricative	voiceless	f				s	sʷ	ʃ	ʃʷ		(x)	(xʷ)	
Fricative	voiced	v				z	zʷ	ʒ					ɦ
Nasal		m				n				ɲ	ŋ	ŋʷ	
Trill						r							
Approximant	lateral					l							
Approximant	central	β̞								j		w	
Approximant	breathy											wʱ	

- Phonemes /tʰʷ, p͡s, b͡z, t͡ʃʼ/ occur only as marginal phonemes.
- Sounds /tʼ, tʷ, x, xʷ/ are sounds that are borrowed from Tswana.

=== Vowels ===
Kalanga has a typical five-vowel system:

	Front	Central	Back
Close	i		u
Mid	e		o
Open		a	
