= Tutume =

Village in Central District, Botswana

Coordinates: 20°30′36″S 27°03′00″E

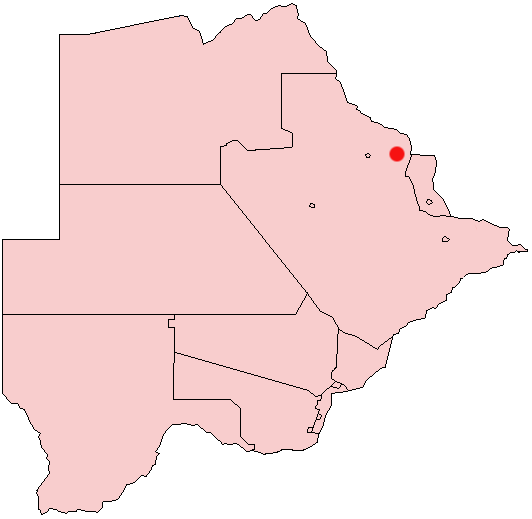
Location of Tutume in Botswana

Tutume is a large Bakalanga village located in the Tutume District of Botswana, about 50 km from the Zimbabwe border gate at Maitengwe. The nearest city is Francistown, about 100 km away. The village is a district headquarters and has a population of 23,000.

It is made up of wards: Sitabule (Madikwe), Tjilagwani (Selolwane), Thini, and Madandume (Magapatona). In each ward, there is a headman and his advisers in the kgotla. The main kgotla is located in Madikwe ward near Tutume Central Primary School.

The village was named after the river Tutume; in Kalanga they will say "gwizi go Tutuma", meaning that the river was overflowing.

There are seven primary schools; Magapatona, Timbi, Thini, Selolwane, Maphorisa and Tutume Central; two junior secondary schools: Denjebuya and Pandagala; and one senior secondary school: Tutume McConnell Community College.

Tutume village is the administration centre for all the villages and settlements in the District area. The village has a police station, a primary hospital, a District hospital, immigration department, a District Council, Botswana Agricultural Marketing Board, Water Utilities Corporation, Botswana Power Corporation, civil registration department, rural administration centre (local council), post office four supermarkets, and bed and breakfast service areas.

The village acts as an umbrella for different BaKalanga clans who all belong to the Wumbe tribe. Before Tutume was developed, people lived at their lands and cattle posts for the fertile virgin-land. People prided themselves in the art of ploughing and animal rearing. The people of the area also pride themselves in their history and their culture and language as is seen daily by how they live, their culture as well as the names they have and continue to give their children up to this day which are all in their Kalanga tongue.

== Notable people ==
- Isaac Makwala (born 1985), Botswana sprinter
- Kemmy Pilato (born 1989), Botswana footballer
- Dabilo Moses (born 2000), Botswana beauty pageant titleholder
