= Marapong =

Village in Botswana

Coordinates: 20°53′36″S 27°4′32″E

Location of Marapong

Marapong is a town in Central District of Botswana. It is located west of Francistown, to the south of the road connecting Francistown to Nata. The population was 2,666 in the 2011 census.
