= Maitengwe =

- Village
- Location within Botswana
- Coordinates: 20°07′44″S 27°12′36″E
- Country: Botswana
- District: Central District

Population (2011)
  - Total: 5,890
- Time zone: GMT +2
- Climate: BSh

Maitengwe is a large village located in the Central District of Botswana. It had 5,890 inhabitants at the 2011 census. It is one of many developing villages in the country and best known for its festive celebrations.

== See also ==
- List of cities in Botswana
