= Barue kingdom =

Precolonial kingdom of Africa

The Barue or Barwe kingdom was a state centred around the Ruenya Valley and Nyanga Plateau in modern-day Zimbabwe and Mozambique.

== History ==
=== Origins ===
Barue's origin lies with the expansion of the Mutapa Empire around the 15th century. (Note: David Beach wrote that Barue was founded in the 15th century or before, citing its long regnal list and a 1512 source indicating it was "well established" at that time.) Barue dynastic tradition indicates the region was uninhabited when they arrived, however archaeological research indicates Tonga habitation preceded the ruling dynasty. Mutapa tradition says that Matope (the second Mwenemutapa according to tradition) gave Barue to his daughter Mureche, while a 19th-century Portuguese source said that Mureche married a son of the Sachiteve (ruler of Uteve) and was given Barue as a dowry. Barue tradition however says that the territory was conquered by Mureche and her husband Chimupore, which is supported by several traditions in the Ruenya Valley. Stan Mudenge wrote that during Matope's conquests he allied local groups, and that he gave Mureche to Chimupore (a prominent member of a local influential clan) in marriage, who acted as his vassal over the conquered territory. David Beach wrote that Barue's Shona dynasty came to adopt the local Tonga language and culture, though still referred to themselves as Karanga (a Shona sub-group). During the reign of Mwenemutapa Chikuyo (c. 1500), both Mutapa and Uteve sought to conquer the highlands of Manyika. The Makombe (king), a loyal vassal of Mutapa, reached Manyika first and installed his son as its Chikanga (king), who became another Mutapa vassal. The first written record of Barue came in 1512.

Barue tradition regards Kabudu Kagoro as their founding ancestor. According to tradition, after his death Kabudu Kagoro became a mhondoro (royal guardian spirit), and a spirit medium (svikiro) located at a shrine on Mount Guru was said to speak for him and was at times consulted by the royal court. However André Van Dokkum identified him with Makombe Chipapata of the 19th century based on written records, with mediumship of his mhondoro beginning after his death and during the reign of his son.

=== Independence and Gunguru's wars ===
The waning of Mutapa power in the area coincided with the arrival of the Portuguese Empire. Barue controlled trade from Sena to Manyika, and deterred Portuguese expansion inland. In 1608, Barue ceased paying tribute to the exiled Mwenemutapa Gatsi Rusere, who declared war on them. However, en route Gatsi's forces were weakened by conflict with the Samungazi Tonga, and on reaching Barue they were forced to retreat, as Barue gained its independence. In 1629, Mutapa was vassalised by the Portuguese after they assisted its ruler during a civil war, and several prazos (land grants to Portuguese settlers) were founded on the Zimbabwean Plateau. Around 1659, Barue was conquered by a prazo-holder, though the Makombe received support from the Portuguese Captain of Sena who sought to prevent the prazo-holder from becoming too powerful, and he quickly withdrew. The late-17th century saw the rise of Changamire Dombo and the Rozvi, who expelled the Portuguese from the Plateau; a contemporary Portuguese source reported that Barue paid a "small tribute" to the Mwenemutapa, though André Van Dokkum wrote that this was likely an alliance against Dombo. Barue was located in between Sena and Dombo (who conquered Manyika in 1695), though Dombo's feared attack on Sena did not materialise as he died in 1696.

In the mid-18th century, Makombe Gunguru assumed the kingship after defeating Mutukunya, who had been supported by the Portuguese. Around the 1750s, Gunguru granted the Portuguese of Sena some land for ceasing to support Mutukunya. According to Van Dokkum, around 1762 Mutukunya took the kingship and granted more lands to the Portuguese, before he was again defeated by Gunguru. Around 1767, Gunguru seized back the land after its locals revolted, and he blocked the trade route to Manyika. The Portuguese attacked Barue and war ensued, during which they burnt down Chetenda (Xetenda), gaining Gunguru sympathy and support from nearby chiefs and provoking reprisal attacks. In 1768, Gunguru and the Portuguese made peace, and Gunguru retained the disputed lands. He continues to be revered in Barue tradition.

Around 1781, the incumbent Makombe fought a civil war against "Prince Cuava" who was reportedly supported by Uteve princes, disrupting trade. The Portuguese sought to support a Makombe favourable to their interests, and about a year later a Makombe was installed who re-opened trade routes to Manyika. However later in 1782, the Makombe was again at war with Cuava and another leader called Chincoma, who blocked the trade routes and robbed Portuguese traders. The Makombe solicited military aid from the Portuguese in defeating the rebels, in exchange for pieces of land Gunguru had won. Around 1790, Gange was reported to be the Makombe. Marriages within totemic descent groups was considered incestuous and taboo in Barue culture, and records of intermarriages between the lineages of Gange and Gunguru indicates that either Gange redefined the concept of exogamy, or he and Gunguru were of different totems. Around 1795, Gange was succeeded by Makombe Sazua, who received tribute from the Portuguese of Sena to allow them to trade and pass through Barue (kuruva). Subordinate leaders also received tribute, but on terms agreed by the Makombe. Sometime after the reign of Gunguru, a ritual involving the Portuguese became the last event of a Makombe's installation, wherein a Portuguese representative brought a flask of holy water (mazia manga, lit. 'water that binds') and poured it over the head of the Makombe. Van Dokkum wrote that this may have been introduced to foster good relations between Barue and the Portuguese after the wars of Gunguru.

=== Decline, resistance, and Portuguese conquest ===
Between 1811 and 1845 there were at least six internecine succession conflicts, usually lasting around 2 years, but sometimes longer. The kingship lay vacant between 1826 and 1830 amid drought, famine, locusts, and disease. In 1833, the Portuguese ceased paying tribute to the Makombe, causing him to block trade to Manyika; a treaty was subsequently signed. The Portuguese feira (marketplace) in Manyika was however abandoned two years later, and Barue entered into a succession conflict. In 1838, Barue was invaded by the Maseko, who had fled the Mfecane, and by the 1840s Barue was part of Soshangane's Gaza Empire. Gazan control was brief however, as they chose to raid Barue extensively instead, greatly weakening the state. Barue paid tribute to Gaza during the 1840s and '50s.

Makombe Chipapata rose to power around 1853 after defeating Makombe Chibudu, who had been supported by Portuguese settlers and Gazan prince Mzila. Based on written records, André Van Dokkum identified Chipapata with Kabudu Kagoro, who Barue tradition holds as the first Makombe. Chipapata allied a prazo-holder in 1853 and unsuccessfully attacked Joaquim José da Cruz (another prazo-holder), reportedly over land, though Van Dokkum said it may have been to curtail da Cruz's power. Despite this, Chipapata retained dominant relations with the Portuguese since his victory over Chibudu, though this soon deteriorated. Around 1854/5, Manuel António de Sousa (a Portuguese trader) was granted a large prazo, and in 1863 he was appointed "captain major" by the Portuguese Crown. Over the following years, de Sousa and the Portuguese subdued da Cruz. Though possibly initially supporting them against da Cruz, Chipapata came to view de Sousa and the Portuguese as a threat. Around 1869, Chipapata allied da Cruz and unsuccessfully attacked de Sousa. The Chikanga (king) of Manyika signed a treaty with de Sousa in 1873, provoking Chipapata and the king of Maungwe to attack him, though he was defended by de Sousa. By 1874, Chipapata likely came to view military conflict against de Sousa as ineffective, and signed trade agreements with him, while de Sousa reportedly married Chipapata's daughter. Chipapata died in 1880/1; the following decades saw the kingship contested between the descendants of Chipapata and Chibudu.

After Chipapata's death, de Sousa began occupying the state and reorganised it, appointing his own provincial chiefs. Mucaka, a son of Chibudu, reportedly led a rebellion against de Sousa but was killed, and by 1883, after the defeat of Chipitura (another son of Chibudu), de Sousa had subdued the population. Kanga, son of Chipapata, reportedly made a deal with de Sousa to be appointed vassal ruler if Chipitura was expelled; Van Dokkum wrote that this was likely to incite Chipitura into rebellion, though Chipitura's flight foiled Kanga's plan to act against de Sousa.

Traditions portray the last king, Nongwe-Nongwe, as indecisive and weak. The kingdom remained independent throughout much of its existence into the 20th century, and the royal court resisted Christian missions. They provided Sena and Tonga chiefdoms with weapons, and confronted the Portuguese in 1901 however the kingdom was annexed to Portuguese Mozambique by general João Coutinho the following year.

=== Colonial and postcolonial periods ===
An uprising in 1917 was put down, as the Barue sought to found a multi-ethnic confederation.

== Government and religion ==
The state was headed by a Makombe (king). David Beach wrote that the ruling dynasty had the nguruve (pig) totem. In theory, the succession system was adelphic collateral succession, wherein the kingship rotated between royal houses, travelling from brother to brother until that generation is exhausted, before moving to the first son of the first brother, then to the first son of the second brother etc. In practice, it was not always clear who was the rightful successor, and succession disputes were common. According to André Van Dokkum, around the mid-17th century the state covered around 22,000 km^{2} (8,500 sq mi) with a maximum diameter of roughly 250 km (160 mi), and it was bounded to the south by the Pungwe River. In the 19th century, the capital was Mbombona, located near Demera Mountain. Though the ruling dynasty adopted the local Tonga language and culture, it retained Shona religious practices. Mukomowasha was the senior counsellor, whose position was hereditary, and belonged to the Tonga Tembo clan.

According to Barue tradition, successors to the throne were chosen by Kabudu Kagoro's mhondoro (medium/royal spirit), said to be based on their qualifications rather than genealogy (however the medium likely weighed who had the most support), and the medium also gave the new king a flaming torch symbolising national unity. However Van Dokkum identified Kabudu Kagoro with Makombe Chipapata of the 19th century, and wrote that mediumship of his mhondoro occurred after his death. Allen Isaacman wrote that the aforementioned practices surrounding succession encouraged competition between candidates.

During the late-18th and 19th centuries, the last event of a Makombe's installation involved the Makombe fasting for three days, reportedly to learn about hardship. After this, a Portuguese representative brought a flask of holy water (mazia manga, lit. 'water that binds'), and poured it over the head of the Makombe, believed to imbue him with sacred qualities. The Makombe was then to choose between a bow and arrow, and a hoe, wherein choosing the hoe meant peaceful relations. Van Dokkum wrote that this may have been introduced after a war during the 1760s between the Barue and the Portuguese, and was intended to foster good relations between the two. Isaacman considered it unclear whether this was an indigenous tradition or a syncretisation with Christianity, however he pointed to the Barue's historical resistance to Portuguese influence and interference as evidence of the former. In one account, a Portuguese official was to bring the mazia manga to the heir-apparent from Sena, but withheld it until they received assurances Portuguese merchants would receive protection. Efforts by the Portuguese in the 19th century to leverage the supply of mazia manga were resisted as the Barue chose to obtain it independently.

== Economy ==
Malyn Newitt wrote that Barue's territory was poorly suited for cattle, which meant that the Makombe lacked access to a common source of power in the region. Barue exported food to Manyika, and was renowned for honey, beeswax, and ivory. Within the state, iron hoes were used as a medium of exchange. Barue's location in between gold-producing Manyika and the Portuguese necessitated that the Portuguese maintained good relations with them, and ivory, cattle, and iron were traded between the two.

== List of rulers ==
The following is a partial regnal list for Barue according to André Van Dokkum, based on Wieschhoff/Shangano's list (also below) and with alternative names found in oral tradition in brackets. Some identifications are less certain than others.

Makombe	Reign	Notes
Mureche (Nyamudzororo)	c. 1450 – c. 1480	Daughter of Matope according to Mutapa tradition
Makombe	c. 1480	Son of Mureche
Gunguru (Katsvaganyidze)	c. 1757/8, 1767–1770	
Mutukunya	c. 1757/8, ?–1767	
?	1782	
Nengisa (Ningira)	?	
Gange (Ganye)	?–1794/5	
Sazua	1794/5–?	
Nyamawanu (Nyamaranu)	c. 1811	
Chimbatata	c. 1811	
Shimari/Shimori (Cimore)	?	
Mocuzucuto (Muzucutto)	c. 1818	
Capanga (Kapanga)	c. 1820	
Sazua	c. 1822	
Bingo	c. 1826	
Inhamaguada	c. 1830	
Chibudu (Cibudu)	c. 1844	
Chipapata (Kabudu Kagoro)	c. 1853–1880/1	Barue tradition regards Kabudu Kagoro as the first Makombe, though Van Dokkum identified him with Makombe Chipapata of the 19th century.
Mucaka (Cimukaka)	1880/1–?	
Kanga/Hanga (Nyaupare)	c. 1892, 1894/5–1902	
Samacande (Samakande)	c. 1893–1894/5	
Chipitura (Chivembe)	1894/5–1898	
Cassiche (Karici)	1898–1900	
Cavunda (Cabvunda)	1900–1902	
Nongwe-Nongwe (Chikuwore)	c. 1917	
Makosa (Kasado)	1917–1918	

The following is a list of Makombes recorded by Heinz Wieschhoff in the early-20th century, based on the recollection of an informant named Shangano:

1. Nyabumudu
2. Daughter of the King Nyadepa
3. Nenduwuta
4. Nyamiciti
5. Ningira
6. Nyamaranu
7. Kapanga
8. Cibudu
9. Nutopwe
10. Cimukaka
11. Cibutora
12. Karici
13. Cabvunda
14. Nakossa
15. Pekani
16. Cidaskwa
17. Zere
18. Nbira or Mbira
19. Citumbu
20. Kabudukagwe
21. Kapini
22. Kapsakanesi or Kawasi
23. Cisekene Nyakureka
24. Nyamutukwa
25. Cinamaueri
26. Ganye
27. Cimore
28. Kapanga
29. Tenere
30. Kabudu Kagore
31. Samakande
32. Nyamaringa
33. Nyipare Langa
34. Nongwe-Nogwe
35. Kasado

== See also ==
- Portuguese conquest of Barue
- Portuguese Mozambique
