= List of rulers of Mutapa =

Monarchs of the Mutapa Empire in Zimbabwe

This is a list of the rulers of the Mutapa Empire.

== List of rulers of Kingdom of Mutapa ==
Territory located in present-day Zimbabwe.

Mwenemutapa = Lord of the Conquered Land.

Tenure	Incumbent	Notes
c.1430	Foundation of Mutapa Kingdom	
c. 1430 to c. 1450	Nyatsimba Mutota, Great Zimbabwe	
c. 1450 to 1480	Matope Nyanhehwe Nebedza, Mwenemutapa	
1480	Mavura Maobwe, Mwenemutapa	
1480 to 1490	Nyahuma Mukombero, Mwenemutapa	
1490 to 1494	Mavhuramhande, Mwenemutapa	
1494 to c. 1530	Chikuyo Chisamarengu, Mwenemutapa	
c. 1530 to c. 1550	Neshangwe Munembire, Mwenemutapa	Neshangwe Munembiri ruled during the Rozvi Dynasty but was not part of the royal Moyo Chirandu clan (VaRozvi). Instead, he belonged to the Moyo Sinyoro clan of the Njanja people. His father, Gouveia, was a Jewish refugee who fled persecution in the Iberian Peninsula (modern-day Portugal and Spain) during the Inquisitions. Gouveia married Princess Mashawashe, the daughter of Chief Chirwa, and she became known as Gambiza, a term derived from the Hebrew Ger Tzedek, meaning "righteous convert" or "righteous foreigner." When their son Neshangwe rose to the position of Mutapa (King), Princess Mashawashe, in accordance with Hebrew tradition, was recognized as Gebirah, meaning "Queen Mother." Over time, the terms Ger Tzedek and Gebirah evolved into "Gambiza," now understood to mean "stranger among us" or "righteous convert." In Njanja culture, "Gambiza" has since been adopted as a title for all women who marry Njanja men, symbolizing a form of cultural conversion. Today, Neshangwe is one of the Njanja chieftainship located in Chikomba.Other Njanja chieftainships are nearby in Buhera.
c. 1550 to 1560	Chivere Nyasoro, Mwenemutapa	
1560 to 1589	Negomo Chirisamhuru, Mwenemutapa	Granted Coat of Arms by King of Portugal
1589 to 1623	Gatsi Rusere, Mwenemutapa	
1623 to 1629	Nyambo Kapararidze, Mwenemutapa	Overthrown by the Portuguese
1629	Mutapa becomes a Portuguese Vassal	
1629 to 1652	Mavura Mhande Felipe, Mwenemutapa	Signs treaty of Vassalage with Portuguese; Dies of accidental gunshot wound.
1652 to 1663	Siti Kazurukamusapa, Mwenemutapa	Son of Mavura; assassinated by Prazos merchants
1663	Mutapa becomes a Rozvi Vassal	
1663 to 1692	Kamharapasu Mukombwe, Mwenemutapa	Allies with Rozvi and throws out Prazos
1692 to 1694	Nyakambira, Mwenemutapa	Assumes throne with Rozvi support; Rozwi vassal king of Manyika after 1694
1694	Mutapa returns to Portuguese vassalage	
1694 to 1707	Nyamhande, Mwenemutapa	Defeats Nyakiambira with Portuguese support
1707 to 1711	Nyenyedzi Zenda, Mwenemutapa	
1711 to 1712	Baroma Mugwagwa, Mwenemutapa	Overthrown and retreats to Chidima
1712	Mutapa returns to Rozvi vassalge	
1712 to 1723	Samatambira Nyamhandu I, Mwenemutapa	Installed by Rozvi invasion
1720	Mutapa independent of Rozvi; moves capital to Chikova in 1723	
1723 to 1735	Samatambira Nyamhandu I, Mwenemutapa	Rules in close alliance with Portuguese at Tete
1735 to 1740	Nyatsusu, Mwenemutapa	
1740 to 1759	Dehwe Mapunzaguta, Mwenemutapa	Has Portuguese garrison reinstated at royal capital.
1760	Mutapa collapses in Civil War; dynasty survives in Chidima	
? to 1917	Chioko	Killed in battle with the Portuguese

== Sources ==
- Stewart, John (1989). African States and Rulers. Jefferson: McFarland & Company, Inc. pp. 395. ISBN 0-89950-390-X.
