= Nehanda Charwe Nyakasikana =

Zimbabwean rebel

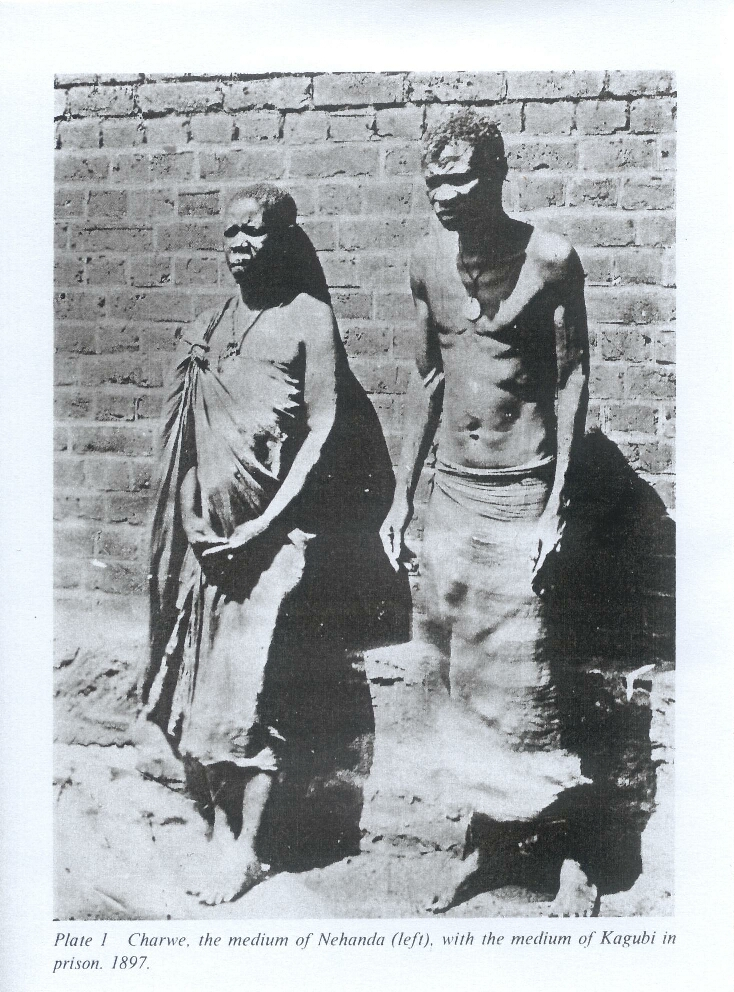
- Nehanda Nyakasikana (left) and Sekuru Kaguvi (right) after their 1897 capture
- Born: c. 1840; Chishawasha, Mashonaland, present-day Zimbabwe
- Died: 27 April 1898; Salisbury, Southern Rhodesia (now Harare, Zimbabwe)
- Other name: Mbuya Nehanda
- Occupations: spirit medium, revolutionary leader
- Known for: Leader in the First Chimurenga
- Children: 2 daughters, 1 son

Nehanda Charwe Nyakasikana also known as Mbuya Nehanda (c. 1840–27 April 1898) was a svikiro, or spirit medium of the Zezuru Shona people. She was a medium of Nehanda, a female Shona mhondoro (a powerful and respected ancestral spirit). As one of the spiritual leaders of the Shona, she was one of the leaders of a revolt, the Chimurenga, against the British South Africa Company's colonisation of what is now Zimbabwe led by Cecil John Rhodes in 1889. She was a Hera of the HwataShava Mufakose Dynasty. She and her ally Sekuru Kaguvi were eventually captured and executed by the company on charges of murder. She has been commemorated by Zimbabweans by statues, songs, novels, and poems, and the names of streets and hospitals. The legacy of the medium continued to be linked to the theme of resistance, particularly the guerrilla war that began in 1972. Her name became of increasing importance to the nationalist movements in Zimbabwe.

== History of the spirit Nehanda ==
The spirit Nehanda is said to be the mhondoro, a royal mudzimu (ancestral spirit) or "lion spirit", that uses women as her mediums. The mediums are given the title Nehanda or Mbuya Nehanda. Mhondoro spirits were revered spirits among the Shona, as it was believed that they could interpret the orders and wishes of Mwari, the senior deity. The original Nehanda was considered to be Nyamhita, the daughter of the first Monomutapa Mutota, who was living in the escarpment north of Guruve in about 1430. Mutota was the founder of the Mutapa state. He had a son called Matope who later became the second Monomatapa. Matope was Nyamhita's younger half brother, and to increase the power of Matope, Mutota ordered his son to sleep with his older half sister, Nyamhita, who became widely known as Nehanda after she was given an area of land called Handa to rule over. This incest ritual was believed to have resulted in the increase of Matope's rule and empire. Matope handed over a part of his empire to Nehanda who became so powerful and well known that her spirit lived on in the human bodies of various spirit mediums until almost 500 years later when it was believed to occupy the body of the Mazoe Nehanda. During periods of possession by the spirit, spirit mediums were believed to be speaking with the voice and personality of the original Nehanda and not with their own.

== Biography of Nehanda Charwe Nyakasikana ==
Charwe Nyakasikana was born in 1840, in what is today called the Chishawasha District located in Central Mashonaland. She was the daughter of a man named Chitaura, who was the younger son of Shayachimwe. Shayachimwe, founded the Hwata dynasty in the upper Mazowe valley in the late eighteenth century. She married and had two daughters and a son, but the name of her husband is not recalled. Living in the hills around Mazoe, Zimbabwe, in the mid 19th century, were various subchiefs including Chidamba. In Chidamba's village lived Charwe Nyakasikana, who was considered to be the female incarnation of the oracle spirit Nehanda. D. N. Beach suggests that she became possessed by the spirit in 1884.

As medium of the spirit Nehanda, Nyakasikana made oracular pronouncements and performed traditional ceremonies that were thought to ensure rain and good crops. She held great authority even before the 1896-7 rebellion. She was a powerful woman and staunchly committed to upholding traditional Shona culture. In a map drawn by missionaries (c. 1888) displaying work by the Church, there is a village called Nehanda's. Mbuya Nehanda was instrumental in organising the nationwide participation in the First Chimurenga of 1896–7. King Lobengula recognised her as a powerful spiritual medium in the land. During the arrival of the first European settlers, Nehanda Charwe Nyakasikana occupied an important and influential position in the religious hierarchy in Mashonaland, where she is the only recorded woman known to have held such a significant position during the 19th century.

Spirit mediums at first promoted good relations between the Zezuru people and early European settlers. As white settlement increased in the land, according to sources Nehanda initially welcomed them by the pioneers and counseled her followers to be friendly towards them. "Don't be afraid of them," she said, "as they are only traders, but take a black cow to them and say this is the meat with which we greet you." However, relationships became strained when the settlers started imposing taxes on the Matabele and conscripting them for various labor projects. Following the imposition of a "hut tax" and other tax assessments in 1894, both the Ndebele and Shona people revolted in June 1896, in what became known as the First Chimurenga or Second Matabele War. The rebellion, in Mashonaland at least, was encouraged by traditional religious leaders including Nyakasikana. Due to the cultural beliefs of the local people, the leading roles behind the rebellion were three spirit mediums. The rebellion was initiated in Matebeland in May 1896, led by Mukwati. In October 1896 Kaguvi and Nehanda from Mashonaland joined in; these were the three critical people behind the rebellion.

Kaguvi (aka Kagubi) was believed to be the spirit husband of the other great Shona spirit, Nehanda, and it may have been this connection which enabled him to persuade Mbuya Nehanda to preach the gospel of war in Mashonaland, which led to the first Chimurenga. The role as well as the influence of the spirit mediums in form of Kaguvi and Nehanda, cannot be understated. As far as the people were concerned Nehanda and Kaguvi were the voices of God aka 'Mwari'. Kaguvi and later Nehanda (after being convinced by Kaguvi) preached that according to Mwari the cause of all the trouble that had come upon the land was the white man. They had brought the locusts and the rinderpest, and to crown it all the owners of the cattle which had died were not allowed to eat the meat of the carcasses, which had to be burned or buried. Mwari decreed that the white men were to be driven from the country; that the natives had nothing to fear because Mwari would turn the bullets of the white man into water.

After the end of the rebellion in 1897, Nyakasikana was captured and charged with the murder of Native Commissioner Henry Hawkins Pollard in 1896. She was found guilty after eyewitnesses claimed that she had ordered an associate to chop Pollard's head off. A public press photograph was taken of Nehanda and Kaguvi in 1897 by the colonial police to show their successes in quelling the rebellion. Consequently, she was hanged in March 1898. Much mythology grew up around the difficulty involved in killing her, although the only account of her executiion that survives comes from a Roman Catholic Jesuit priest, Fr Francis Richartz. Richartz had been sent to Mashonaland as a missionary, and had been working through the prisoners in an attempt to convert them before their deaths. His account suggests that he was successful with the other condemned prisoners, and was able to baptise them before their deaths. However, he did not manage to convert Nehanda to Christianity before her death.

To Neanda [sic] I did not speak till evening, in order to avoid a scene, though I had a long quiet talk with her, which made me feel even hopeful. However, when in the evening about 6 o'clock I saw her again and in presence of Victor, who tried his best to persuade her to listen to me, told her that she had to die next morning, she began to behave like a mad woman. She took her blankets and wished to leave the cell, and when told to remain and keep quiet, she refused and said she never would endure to be locked up. When we saw that nothing could be done with her I went away with Victor, and Neanda began to dance, to laugh and talk, so that the warders were obliged to tie her hands and watch her continually, as she threatened to kill herself.

On Wednesday April 27th, the Feast of Blessed Peter Canisius, I said an early Mass and drove to the gaol, where I found the officials ready and everything prepared. I again made an attempt to speak to Neanda and bring her to a better frame of mind, but she refused, called for her people and wanted to go back to her own country - the Mazoe - and die there, and behaved as she had done went to Kakubi who received me in good dispositions. Whilst I was conversing with him Neanda was taken out to the scaffold. Her cries and resistance when she was taken up the night before. When I saw that nothing could be done with her, the time for the execution having arrived, I left Neanda and the ladder, the screaming and yelling on the scaffold disturbed my conversation with Kakubi very much, till the noisy opening of the trap-door upon which she stood, followed by the heavy thud of her body as it fell, made an end to the interruption. [...] After some time had elapsed and the last body had been taken down and placed with the others in the gaol hospital and inspected by the authorities, they were all covered up and I said the funeral service over them. Death was in every case instantaneous. All the officials and warders were very kind and obliging, which was a great help to me.

— Fr Francis Richartz, SJ, The Zambesi Mission Record, Vol 1, No 2

== Legacy ==
Nehanda's heroism became a significant source of inspiration in the nationalist struggle for liberation in the 1960s and 1970s. Her name is now usually prefixed by the respectful title of Mbuya, or grandmother [a title also given to female spirit mediums & ancestors in African spirituality]. The maternity section of Parirenyatwa Hospital in Harare is named after her. The College of Health Sciences of the University of Zimbabwe is located there as well.

The judgement docket and other documents from the legal case against Nehanda and Kaguvi are now kept at the National Archives of Zimbabwe in Harare. In 2015, UNESCO added this collection to the Memory of the World international register, recognising it as documentary heritage of global importance.

In May 2021, a statue of Mbuya Nehanda was unveiled in Zimbabwe's capital Harare along Julius Nyerere Way, where the road meets Samora Machel Avenue. Zimbabwean sculptor David Guy Mutasa designed the statue of Mbuya Nehanda.

On 11 August 2026 a ferry bearing the name Mbuya Nehanda capsized on Lake Kariba killing at least 97 people after it capsized in a storm.
