= Fungai Ndemera =

Zimbabwean entrepreneur

- Born: Mhondoro, Zimbabwe
- Occupation: Businesswoman
- Employer: Checkup Health

Fungai Ndemera is a United Kingdom-based Zimbabwean entrepreneur, speaker, angel investor, mentor and STEM ambassador.

Fungai Ndemera was born in Mhondoro, Zimbabwe. She then grew up in Rimuka, Kadoma before moving to Harare from where she relocated to the United Kingdom to work as nurse . She started her career as a businesswoman in 2001 when she co-founded The Flame Lily Healthcare whilst working as a nurse. She then founded of Independent Care Solutions in 2011 and in 2016 she established CheckUp Health Software Solutions, an NHS approved primary healthcare AI-driven platform for remote monitoring of patients with clinicians and healthcare professionals.

In 2021, she was awarded a project grant by Innovate UK for CheckUp Health. During the COVID-19 pandemic, Fungai developed remote monitoring modules for the CheckUp Health application through a grant from Innovate UK's Sustainable Innovation Fund then she ran a study through which the platform was reported to have saved the NHS an estimated £4 million.

Fungai Ndemera contributed to the book The Voice in the Shadow which highlights the journeys of 51 prominent Black women in the UK who have made an impact in the tech industry. She also authored The all dots digital transformation model and co-authored Cultivating Your IT Factor in 2015.
