= Zvongombe =

Archaeological ruins in Zimbabwe

Coordinates: 16°42′24.4″S 31°12′44.1″E

Zvongombe is an archaeological site in Mashonaland Central, Zimbabwe, located near the Zambezi River. It is the home of a 15th-century namesake city. It is believed to have been settled around 1450. The decline of Great Zimbabwe in the 15th century led to the establishment of the Kingdom of Mutapa. According to oral tradition, around 1420, Chibatamatosi sent Nyatsimba Mutota north to look for salt. He found salt 300 miles (480 km) north by a tribe of elephant hunters near the Zambezi River in a gold-rich area. Nyatsimba Mutota took some of his people and moved to the modern-day Centenary area, settling the first capital at Zvongombe.

== Location ==
Zvongombe is about 10 kilometres (6.2 mi) east of Centenary and south of the Zambesi Escarpment.

=== Layout ===
The presence of Q-type walling at Zvongombe represents the dry-stone structures that are a significant aspect of the Zimbabwe Culture. Archaeological studies at Zvongombe aimed to identify connections to northern settlement sites and the original Zimbabwe Culture, founded further south in Mapungubwe. Zvongombe Hill is home to two stone enclosures and exposed bare granite and boulders at its peak. The site is on a saddle that ascends to a rocky knoll at the northern extremity. Despite a survey of the hill revealing no significant archaeological remains on the surface, grass, and fallen leaves may have concealed them. The layout of the stone walls at Zvongombe North consists of a rectangular enclosure. Only the eastern wall, which measures 40 m, is constructed and features a simple entrance with curved ends in the center. The southern end stands between 1.5 and 2.6 m tall. Poles and dhaka huts obstruct the southern side. From Pwiti's general impression, based on the depths of the deposits and the lack of archaeological evidence, no one used the Northern enclosure extensively for a long time. The stone walls of Zvongombe South exhibit a roughly rectangular layout, extending to the southwest. An outer radial wall is situated to the west, where the terrain is rocky and uneven. Approximately 10 meters further west, the land abruptly descends into a low cliff, beneath which shallow rock shelters can be found.
