= Fort São Miguel de Chicova =

Fort São Miguel de Chicova was a succession of Portuguese colonial fortifications located in the region of Chicova in Tete, Mozambique, along the banks of the Zambezi River. Portuguese activities in this region of the Zambezi are related to the search for silver mines.

The first of these fortifications was erected in May or June 1576. Vasco Fernandes Homem, who had succeeded Francisco Barreto in the expedition against the Kingdom of Mutapa, left 200 men in Chicova at that time, under the command of António Cardoso de Almeida. He built the fort, but was unable to buy supplies from the locals, left the fort and was killed.

In 1614 the Fort São Miguel was rebuilt by Diogo Simões Madeira, once again related to the search for silver mines. However, this was abandoned in August 1616. The commander Simões Madeira abandoned the region of Chicova to Tete.

There may have been a third Portuguese fort or simple garrison, which would have been withdrawn in 1680, with authorization from Goa. By this time, Teodósio Garcia was the commander of the fort.
