= Teve kingdom =

Precolonial state in southeastern Africa

The Teve kingdom or Uteve was a precolonial state in modern-day Mozambique belonging to the Teve people (a Shona sub-group). The state was headed by a Sachiteve.

Mutapa tradition says that Mwenemutapa Mukombero (r. late-15th century) was assisted in gaining control over Uteve by Changamire I, and placed his own son Manyenganyura as its ruler. Some Teve traditions however say that Bandahuma fled his brother, the incumbent Mwenemutapa, and was assisted by a 'Changamire' in conquering Uteve to become the first Sachiteve. In the early-16th century, the Sachiteve declared independence from Mutapa with the help of Changamire II, and conquered Madanda where he placed his younger brother as the first Sedanda. Over the following decades Uteve embarked on campaigns of expansion in an attempt to control the lucrative trade route from Portuguese-controlled Sofala to gold-producing Manyika and came into conflict with Mutapa, though little is known of the Mutapa–Teve wars and their outcome, except that they continued into the 1540s.

In the early-17th century the Portuguese supported a candidate to the kingship who reportedly supplanted the rightful ruler and paid tribute to them. In the 1640s, a Portuguese settler helped the Sachiteve remain in power, and in reward took the whole northern part of Uteve as his prazo. In the 1690s, during the rise of Changamire Dombo and the Rozvi, the Portuguese attempted another coup against the incumbent Sachiteve, but were repelled by a rebellion which saw Uteve regain its sovereignty in a reduced form. In the 1830s, the region was invaded by Nguni groups who had fled the Mfecane, and a puppet ruler was installed by Nxaba.
