= Manyika kingdom =

Precolonial state in Southern Africa

The Manyika kingdom was a precolonial state in modern-day Zimbabwe and Mozambique belonging to the Manyika people (a Shona sub-group). The state was headed by a Chikanga (king), and was famous for its gold production, which was exported to Swahili city-states on the east coast.

Stan Mudenge wrote that the kingdom was founded as a vassal state of the Mutapa Empire during Mwenemutapa Chikuyo's reign (c. 1500) when the king of Barue (another Mutapa vassal) sent his son to conquer the Manyika highlands. Hoyini Bhila wrote that Manyika tradition indicates that they had their own rulers, though he said that it was likely conquered by Mutapa sometime after 1494. In the late-16th century the Portuguese established a feira (marketplace) in Manyika with Mutapa's approval. Manyika gained its independence in the early-17th century while Mutapa was embroiled in civil war. In the 1690s Manyika was conquered by Changamire Dombo of the nascent Rozvi Empire who appointed his own candidate as the first ruler of Manyika's Mutasa dynasty (Mudenge wrote that this may have been the exiled Mwenemutapa Nyakunembire). Manyika continued under Rozvi suzerainty until the mid-18th century when it again became de facto independent. In the 1830s the region was invaded by Nguni groups who had fled the Mfecane, and during the 1840s and '50s Manyika paid tribute to Soshangane's Gaza Empire. In 1890 Manyika was partitioned between Portugal and the British South Africa Company.
