= Gonçalo da Silveira =

16th-century Portuguese Jesuit missionary

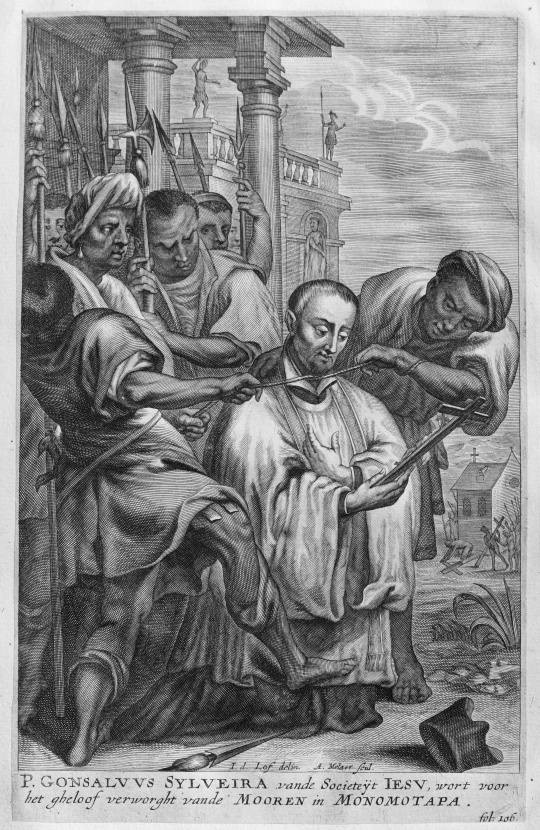

Personal details
- Born: 23 February 1526 Almeirim, Kingdom of Portugal
- Died: 6 March 1561 (aged 35) Kingdom of Mutapa
- Occupation: Jesuit priest and missionary

Gonçalo da Silveira, S.J. (23 February 1526 – 15-16 March 1561) was a Portuguese Jesuit missionary in southern Africa.

== Life ==
Silveira was born at Almeirim, Portugal, about 40 miles (64 km) from Lisbon. He was the tenth child of Luís da Silveira, first count of Sortelha, and Beatriz Coutinho, daughter of Fernando Coutinho, Marshal of the Kingdom of Portugal. Losing his parents in infancy, he was brought up by his sister Filipa de Vilhena and her husband, the Marquis of Távora.

Silveira was educated by the Friars Minor of the friary of Santa Margarida until 1542, when he went to finish his studies at the University of Coimbra, but he had been there little more than a year when he was received into the Society of Jesus by Father Miron, the Rector of the Jesuit college at Coimbra.

Silveira was appointed provincial superior of India in 1555. The appointment was approved by Ignatius Loyola a few months before his death. Gonçalo's term of government in India lasted three years. He used to say that God had given him the great grace of unsuitability for government — apparently basing this on a certain want of tact in dealing with human weakness.

The next provincial, António Quadros, sent Silveira to the unexplored mission field of south-east Africa. Landing at Sofala on 11 March 1560, da Silveira proceeded to Otongwe near Cape Correntes.

Mwenemutapa (king/emperor) Negomo was told that a prestigious Portuguese mhondoro/n'anga (medium/diviner) would be sent to his court. Having arrived at Mutapa in 1561, the immaterialism of Silveira's refusal of Negomo's gifts of women, gold, cows, and land impressed Negomo, and Negomo invited him into his private quarters (an unheard-of privilege) to discuss matters. Silveira told Negomo he wished to gain his conversion, and a few days later gifted him a painting of the Virgin Mary. Young and unmarried, Negomo was captivated by the painting and hung it in his sleeping quarters. After experiencing dreams where the painting talked to him in an unintelligible language, Negomo asked Silveira why he couldn't understand the language, who replied that it was because he wasn't yet Christian. At Negomo's request, Silveira catechised him and his mother for around a fortnight, after which they were baptised. Silveira gifted Negomo cloth, while Negomo gifted 100 cows, which Silveira had killed and distributed among the population. This greatly increased Silveira's influence, and he converted and baptised hundreds of high-ranking Shona.

Religious leaders such as mhondoro and n'anga were key to the functioning of the state and its stability, and Mudenge says that they were probably denigrated by Silveira. Muslim traders and court officials who hadn't converted also likely viewed Silveira as a threat. These three groups collaborated to turn Negomo against Silveira, though Shona perceptions of Silveira's mission have been disputed. The traditional interpretation by historians such as Mudenge has been that the collaborators told Negomo that Silveira was a spy whose real motive was to inform a Portuguese invasion, and that he was a secret ally of Sachiteve Chipute and a muroyi (wizard) who would use his supernatural powers to devastate Mutapa and kill the Munhumutapa. It continues that Silveira was strangled with a rope by a group led by the mbokorume and thrown in the Musengezi River. Having re-evaluated the evidence, Gai Roufe says that Silveira was interpretated as embodying the spirit of Karuva/Dzivaguru, a foreign spirit (shavi, which were feared). (Note: Roufe refers to accounts where the conclusion of succession conflicts in Mutapa ideally ended with a ritual that re-enacted the local tradition of Matope defeating Karuva, where the losing claimant was strangled to death with a ribbon by a group led by the mbokorume, similar to Silveira's murder. Other accounts say that if the kingship passed peacefully, a lord with the title Nevinga would reign for three days before playing the role of Karuva as part of a coronation ritual. In the tradition Karuva is said to have disappeared into the ground and created a "great lake" (the literal meaning of Dzivaguru), and locals decades later are reported as believing Silveira had been thrown into a lake. Roufe says that this was likely how Silveira was perceived, partly because Negomo was not hostile to the Portuguese after the event.) Days later, Portuguese merchants arrived to say that God would punish Negomo and the viceroy would send an army to avenge Silveira; Negomo blamed Muslims and had those involved killed.

== Legacy ==
A cause for Silveira's beatification was formally opened in 1629, and he was granted the title Servant of God in the Catholic church.

H. Rider Haggard would base the fictional character, José Silvestre, on Silveira in his 1885 novel, King Solomon's Mines.

Silveira House, a Jesuit development centre in Zimbabwe, is named after him.

Silveira High School and Hospital, a Catholic Mission in Bikita, Zimbabwe is also named after him.

== Sources ==
- Chadwick, Hubert (1910). Life of the venerable Gonçalo da Silveira of the Society of Jesus. Benziger Brothers.
- Chirenje, J. Mutero (1973). "Portuguese Priests and Soldiers in Zimbabwe, 1560-1572: The Interplay between Evangelism and Trade". The International Journal of African Historical Studies. 6 (1): 36–48. doi:10.2307/216972. ISSN 0361-7882.
- Rea, W. F. (1960). "Gonçalo Da Silveira: Protomartyr of Southern Africa (Salisbury, Southern. Rhodesia: Rhodesiana Society" (PDF). Rhodesiana. 6. Rhodesiana Society.
- Roufe, Gai (2015). "The Reasons for a Murder: Local Cultural Conceptualizations of the Martyrdom of Gonçalo da Silveira in 1561". Cahiers d'Études Africaines. 55 (219): 467–487. ISSN 0008-0055.
- Theal, Records of S. E. Africa, printed for the Government of Cape Colony, VII (1901);
- Wilmot, Monomotapa T. F. Unwin (London, 1896)
  - Appendix C includes a translation of Bib. Vat. Cod. Othob. Lat. 2416, F 899. (1699/1700).
