= Mhondoro =

Shona royal spirits

Mhondoro ("lion spirit", lit. 'lion') are royal ancestral spirits in Shona traditional religion. They correspond to territorial domains, and are regarded as guardians who mediate between Mwari (God) and the people. The term can also refer to the svikiro (medium) believed to be possessed by the spirit.

Despite the collapse or colonial conquest of dynasties whose deceased members had become mhondoro, as institutions the cults surrounding them continue to be widely attended in present-day Zimbabwe, and they were instrumental in organising resistance during the First and Second Chimurengas.

== Beliefs and practices ==
Shona tradition holds that when a chief dies, their spirit enters a maneless lion, before entering a svikiro (medium) where it retains lion-like characteristics. Ancestral spirits (midzimu) are included in Shona conceptions of the community; while common midzimu are held as influential regarding wellbeing at the familial level, mhondoro are responsible for the wellbeing of a wider group. When possessed, a svikiro speaking is viewed as the spirit speaking (sometimes interpreted by an assistant). Svikiro are generally young and of the same sex as the spirit. A successor is usually chosen by the elderly medium prior to their death, though the position can be hereditary. A lion that behaves in certain ways can be viewed as a mhondoro, especially if it kills people who have misbehaved.

The Zezuru hold the Rukoto Ceremony annually to thank mhondoro for rainmaking. It is held at important mhondoro shrines, and sweet beer is offered to the spirits.

== Individual mhondoro ==
While individual mhondoro are typically revered by a single tribe or clan, some transcend those political and social divisions and serve as guardians for regions, provinces, or nations.

Scholars Frans Verstraelen and Kariamu Welsh say that the main mhondoro are Mambiri, Tovera, Murenga, Runni, Chaminuka, Mushavatu, and Nehanda.

- Dzivaguru is regarded as a very powerful mhondoro of the Korekore people, renowned for rainmaking. He is believed to have ended a drought in the early-20th century. Some traditions say Dzivaguru lived in Dande, but lost a battle to Chief Nyanhehwe (who is himself a mhondoro). Virgin girls were given to Dzivaguru as wives, who was believed to then pay the bridewealth with rain. He did not have a medium. Scholar Diana Auret says that it is uncertain whether he was a historical figure, because for other Shona peoples Dzivaguru is a praise name for Mwari.
- Chaminuka is held as the most powerful mhondoro among the Zezuru people, and is also renowned for rainmaking. He is regarded as a son of Mwari, and the Zezuru trace their agricultural knowledge to him.
- Mutota is held as the founder of the Korekore, and to be kin to their other major spirits. He is said to have lived in the 15th century, and may have been a medium for Chaminuka. Donald Abraham said that Mutota was the same as Nyatsimba Mutota (the founder of the Mutapa Empire), although David Beach has criticised his sources and questioned whether Nyatsimba Mutota was a historical or symbolic figure.
- Nehanda is a female mhondoro revered among the Zezuru. Some traditions say she was the daughter of Mutota, and that it was her medium who led the First Chimurenga in the late-19th century, while others say it was that leader who became a mhondoro.
- Kabudu Kagoro was the first Makombe (king) of Barue according to tradition. Accordingly, after his death he was held as the mhondoro for the nation, residing on Mount Guru, and his svikiro was sometimes consulted by the royal court, and also chose a new king. However André Van Dokkum identified him with Makombe Chipapata of the 19th century based on written records, with mediumship of his mhondoro beginning after his death and during the reign of his son.
- Karuva is a mhondoro revered among the Korekore and Tavara. Diana Auret said that he is believed to have been a member of an ancient dynasty that the Korekore defeated. S. I. G. Mudenge wrote that Karuva was a rainmaking priest of Dzivaguru (God) in Dande that Matope defeated when founding the Mutapa Empire.
