= Portuguese conquest of Barue =

Barue Campaign
- Part of Campaigns of Pacification and Occupation
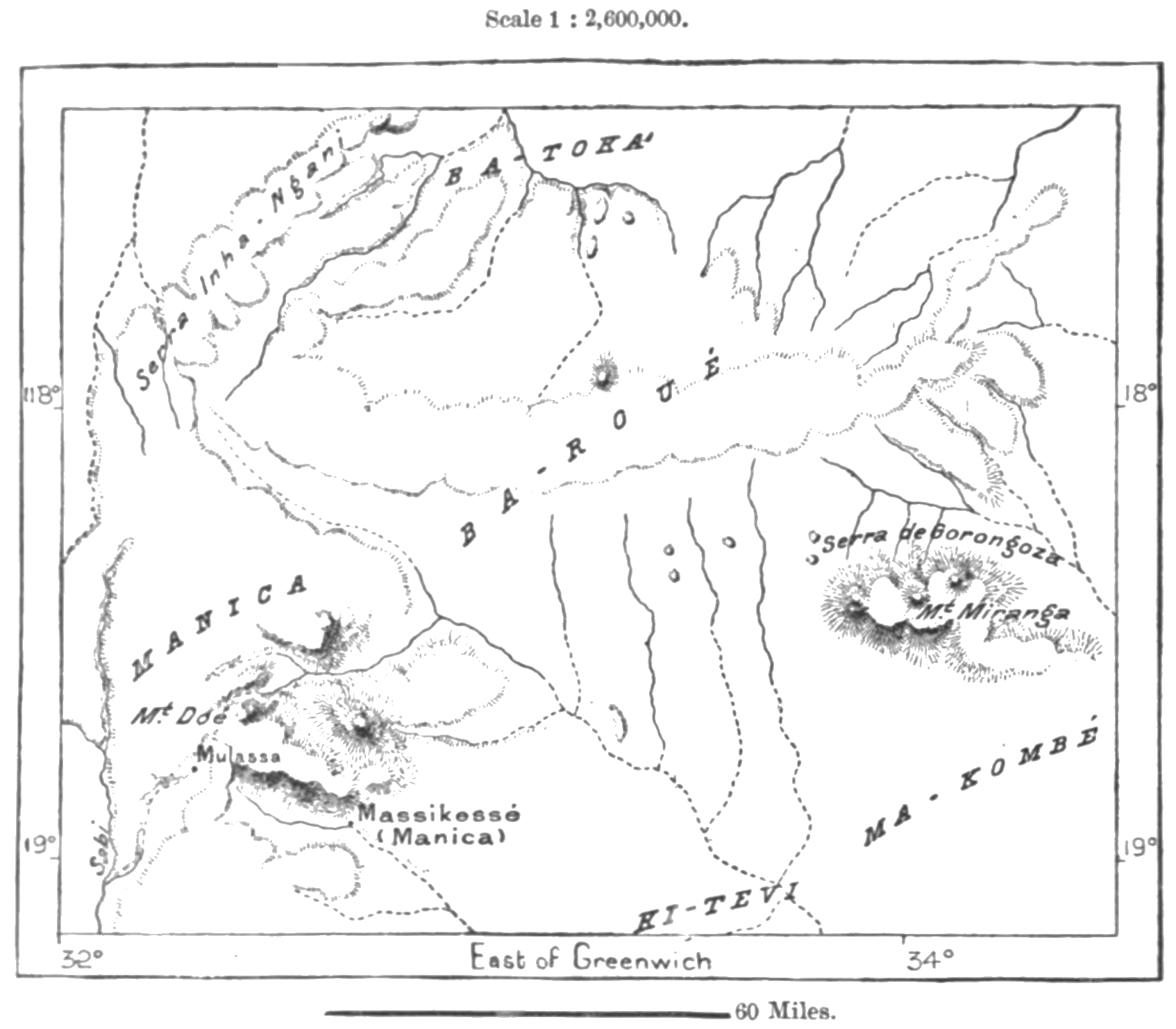
- Barue, between Gorongosa and Manica
Date	July – October 1902
Location	Barue, Mozambique
Result	Portuguese victory
Territorial changes	Annexation of Barue by Portugal

Belligerents
Kingdom of Portugal	Kingdom of Barue

Commanders and leaders
João de Azevedo Coutinho	Makombe Hanga

Strength
16,000 men	~10,000 warriors

The Portuguese conquest of Barue, also known as the Barue Campaign, was a military operation undertaken in 1902. It was part of the Portuguese Campaigns of Pacification and Occupation and it resulted in the annexation of the Kingdom of Barue to Portuguese Mozambique.

== History ==
Barue was located on the border with British Rhodesia, which gave it strategic value to Portuguese policy. Any instability in the kingdom could lead to issues with the United Kingdom, which risked undermining Portuguese international standing in the region. The king of Barue Makombe Hanga on his part actively provided African lords who rebelled against Portugal with weapons and troops, and the alliances he had cultivated threatened Portuguese sovereignty over the Zambezi valley. Barue was at the center of anti-Portuguese activity in Mozambique.

The forces of Barue numbered about 10,000 men and were distributed throughout the kingdom in a network of aringas and palisades. Half of them were armed with firearms. Among these, the most important were those of Missongue, Mungari, and Mafunda, the first two of included artillery among its defenses. After a failed attempt by the Mozambique Company to control the territory indirectly, the Portuguese government organized a large expedition of 1,000 Portuguese soldiers, about half of whom came from the metropolitan army, and 15,000 sipaios (African gendarmes), commanded by João de Azevedo Coutinho. Although the Portuguese intended to attack in May or June 1802, the recruitment of such a large number of sipaios could not be completed before July. The Portuguese had two main objectives: to quickly capture Missongue and Mungari, and close the Barue border to prevent any outside aid.

The shaman Kabudu Kagoro played an important role in the unfolding of the conflict, as he convinced Barue warriors that Portuguese bullets would turn to water and were therefore harmless. According to Coutinho, even the Portuguese auxiliary sipaios refused to fight for fear that their bullets would prove ineffective. However, a medium allied with the Portuguese convinced the sipaios that King Makombe Hanga would turn into a sluggish hippopotamus, and only then did the sipais agree to advance.

On July 30, the main column of the Portuguese army, composed of three detachments of elite Portuguese and African soldiers, accompanied by a reserve of more than 2,000 men, attacked Tambara, an important Tonga stronghold. After two days of fierce fighting, the Portuguese captured the stronghold. From Tambara, the Portuguese advanced to Mafunda, which defended the entrance to the Muira Valley, and with the help of a detachment from Sena, the main column conquered the main Tonga chiefdoms in two weeks. Having conquered the Tonga vassals of Barue, the Portuguese advanced to Sança and established their headquarters there.

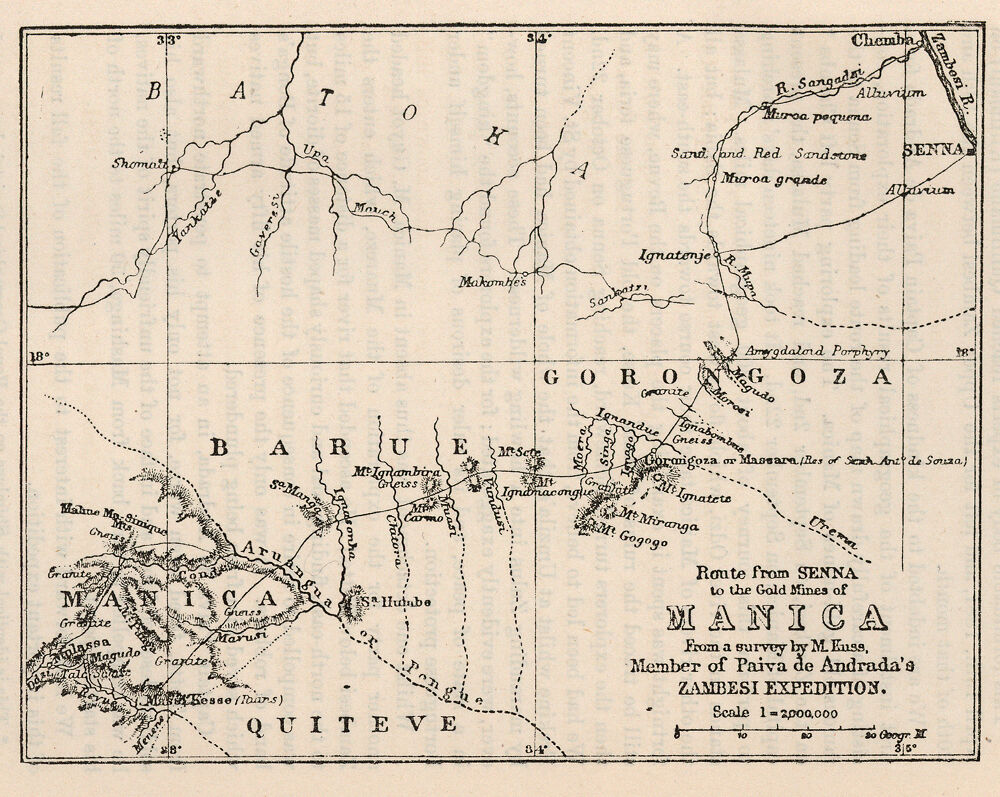
"Route from Senna to the Gold Mines of Manica", passing by Barue. 1882 map.

By August 19, the Barué border had been crossed, but by then the Barue warriors had withdrawn most of their forces to the stronghold of Inhangome, defended by the famous chief Cambuemba, wanted by Portuguese authorities. Cambuemba, however, was ordered to retreat to the capital, Missongue. Thousands of warriors awaited the Portuguese, but after several hours the Barué were defeated and forced to flee. Portuguese Maxim machine guns and cannons allowed them to dominate the territory within three months.

Barue 1902 was Portugals best and most well organized military campaign in Mozambique. The Portuguese navy was particularly important for the transportation of men, animals, machinery and provisioning to advanced posts inland, whilst protecting the rear lines. Azevedo Coutinho's victory in Barue sealed the occupation of central Mozambique.

== See also ==
- Portuguese Mozambique
- History of Mozambique
