= Statue of Mbuya Nehanda =

Monument in Harare, Zimbabwe

Mbuya Nehanda Statue
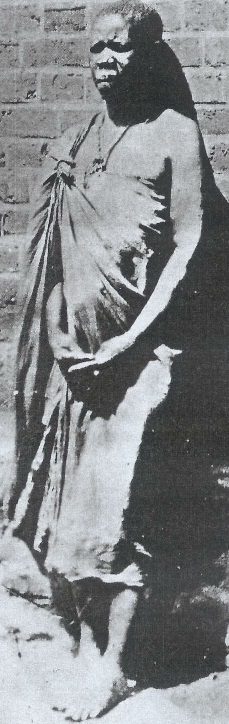
- Photo of Mbuya Nehanda upon which the statue is based
- Artist: David Mutasa
- Year: 2021
- Type: Bronze
- Location: Harare, CBD; Harare

The Statue of Mbuya Nehanda is a bronze monument of a Zimbabwean Shona spirit medium and heroine of the 1896-1897 First Chimurenga war against British colonists. The monument is erected at the intersection of Samora Machel Avenue and Julias Nyerere Way in Harare's central business district.

== Background ==
It is the first statue of a Zimbabwean female liberation war hero and was unveiled on Africa Day, 25 May 2021. The monument is part of the National Museums and Monuments of Zimbabwe.

The 3-meter high statue crafting was guided by a photograph of Mbuya Nehanda Charwe Nyakasikana that was supplied by the National Archives of Zimbabwe. It was crafted by Mr David Mutasa, a bronze casting artist at Nyati Gallery; construction of the site was carried out by Zimbabwe CRSG Construction.

Construction began in June 2020 and during construction, portions of Harare CBD roads including Samora Machel Avenue between Leopold Takawira Street and First Street and Julius Nyerere Way between Sam Nujoma Street and Kwame Nkurumah Avenue were temporarily closed.

Construction was scheduled to be completed by August 2020 but took longer than expected. In December 2020, Zimbabwe President Emmerson Mnangagwa ordered the statue to be re-crafted after public criticism of the statue's structure, which did not depict how the only known photo of Mbuya Nehanda looked like, after the statue's images went viral on social media during the president's visit to Nyati Gallery.

== Controversy ==
The idea of making and constructing this statue project sparked public debate and criticism from public figures and analysts like Fadzayi Mahere and Tsitsi Dangarembga questioning the government's priorities in its decision to spend an undisclosed amount of money on the statue while the economy and health system are in a state of collapse.

More criticism emerged when the statue had to be remade after the original sculpture was rejected for not looking enough like Mbuya Nehanda.

The actual cost of this project is unknown, although popular journalist Hopewell Chin'ono claimed that transportation of materials from South Africa for crafting the statue alone cost US$100,000.
