= Mount Fura =

Mount Fura is a mountain found on old maps where the gold mines and capital of the Monomotapa kingdom was located. It is possibly to be identified as Stanford (1896) with modern Mount Darwin in Mashonaland Central, Zimbabwe.
