= Barue uprising =

Barue Uprising
- The Barue Revolt or The Barue Rebellion; Part of World War I
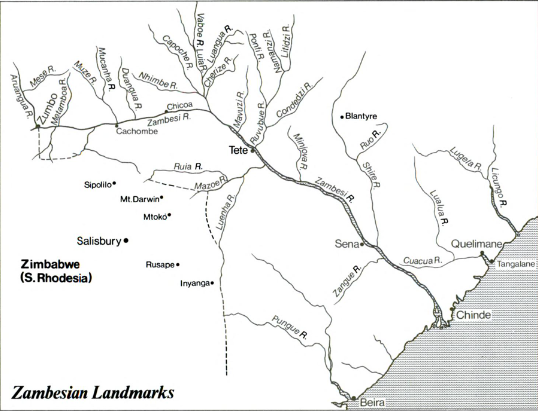
- The main area of the revolt in 1917
- Date: 1917 – 1918
- Location: Mozambique
- Caused by: Oppression from the Portuguese colonial government
- Goals: Independence of Mozambique
- Result: Revolt failure, brutal suppression of Mozambique

Parties
Portugal	Barue Rebels

The Barue uprising (also known as the Barue revolt or the Barue rebellion) was an uprising in 1917 during WW1 in Portuguese Mozambique.

The colonial authorities in Portuguese Mozambique increased the brutality of their occupation during the war, such as using forced labour despite the abolition of slavery.

Press gangs (cipais) used the most brutal coercion to mobilise whole populations, including the young, old and infirm. There were also reports of women being raped.

By the end of 1916, many young men had fled to Southern Rhodesia and Transvaal to escape the Portuguese and to work. When the cipais tried to raise another 5,000 carriers from the Barue Kingdom in March 1917, the population rebelled, with rivals for the title of Makombe (king) of the Barue fighting independent campaigns.

At the end of April, the rebels defeated a Portuguese force sent to suppress the uprising, later marching to the colonial provincial capital of Tete by the end of May.

These rebels had overrun most of Zambezia Province. About 100,000 people crossed the border into British Nyasaland and the Rhodesian colonies to escape the violence.

Despite having received support to help put down the Chilembwe rebellion in 1915, shortly before the Barue Uprising, the British did not send any troops to Barue, only allowing guns and ammunition over the border.

In May 1917, the Portuguese responded with force, suppressing the rebels with violence and killing thousands of people. The rebels held out into November 1917, and the rivals for the title of Makombe fled to Southern Rhodesia.

In June of the same year, the Portuguese force deployed to Barue was reduced, and thousands of Portuguese and local troops were sent to respond to a rebellion by the Makonde on the Mvua plateau.

Another rebellion broke out in early 1918.

== See also ==
- Kingdom of Barue

== Bibliography ==
- Paice, E. (2009) [2007]. Tip and Run: The Untold Tragedy of the Great War in Africa (Phoenix ed.). London: Weidenfeld & Nicolson. ISBN 978-0-7538-2349-1.
