= Swahili city-states =

African coast self-governing urban centres

- City States
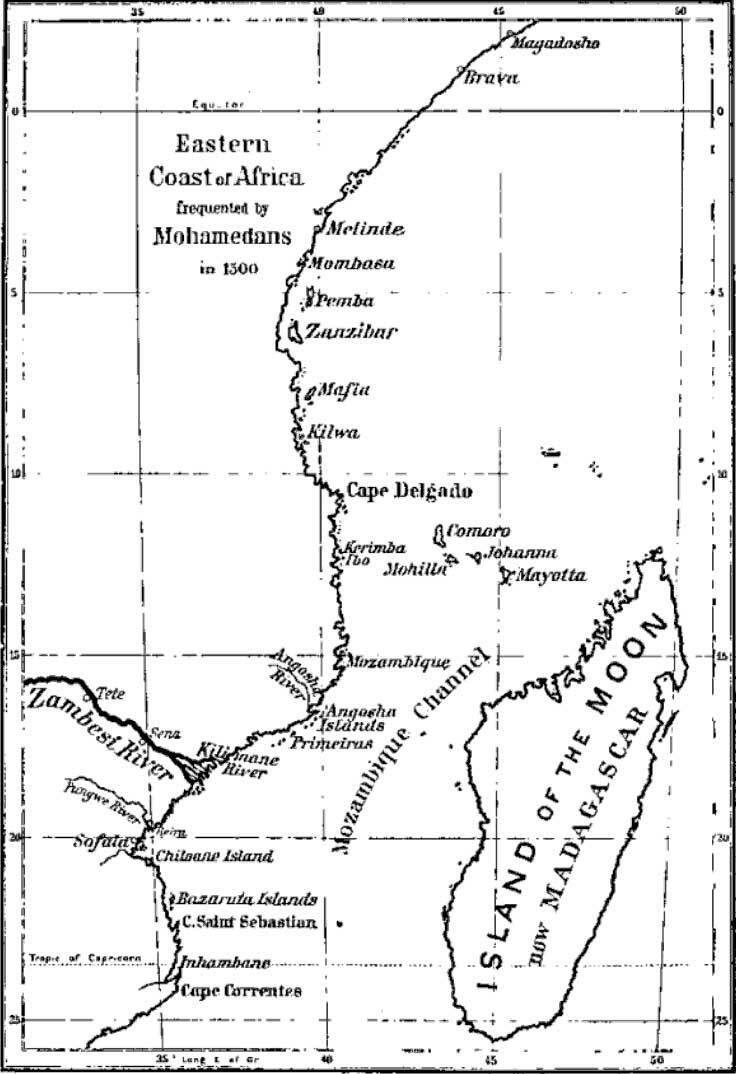
- Map of East African city states
- Formed: 8th century

Government
  - Head: Sultan
- Government type: Autonomous city states
- Language: Swahili
- Location: East Africa Coast
- Cities: Kilwa; Mombasa; Sofala; Lamu; Pate; Zanzibar; Malindi; Pemba; Gedi
- Religion: Islam
- Ethnicity: Swahili, Shirazi

The Swahili city-states were independent, self-governing urban centres that were located on the Swahili coast of East Africa between the 8th and 16th centuries. These were primarily coastal hubs, including Kilwa, Mombasa, and Zanzibar, which prospered due to their advantageous locations along Indian Ocean trade networks, enabling interactions between Africa and Asia.

== Rise ==
Around the 8th century, the Swahili people established trade networks with Arab, Persian, Indian, Chinese, and Southeast Asian merchants, engaging in what became known as the Indian Ocean trade. These extensive trade routes introduced the Swahili to diverse cultural influences from Arabic, Persian, Indian, and Chinese traditions. By the 10th century, numerous cities including Kilwa, Malindi, Gedi, Pate, Comoros, and Zanzibar, thrived along the Swahili Coast and nearby islands. These city-states were predominantly Muslim, culturally diverse, and politically autonomous.

Their prosperity stemmed from the Swahili people's role as intermediaries, facilitating trade between local merchants and traders from Arabia, Persia, Indonesia, Malaysia, India, and China. They competed for access to the lucrative trade of the Great Lakes region, exporting goods such as salt, ebony, gold, ivory, sandalwood, and slaves. However, these city-states began to decline in the 16th century, primarily due to the arrival of the Portuguese. This marked the downfall of Swahili trading hubs and the eventual collapse of African-Asian commerce across the Indian Ocean.

== Decline ==
The rise of Portuguese and Dutch dominance in Indian Ocean trade after 1500 significantly weakened the coastal city-states. Prominent centers like Sofala and Kilwa were transformed into European colonial outposts. The lack of a unified political structure left these city-states unprepared to counter the superior military technology and strategies of the Portuguese and Dutch.

== Trade ==
The growth of Indian Ocean trade between Asia and Africa led to the development of influential coastal city-states in East Africa. Trade involved both local and international exchanges. These city states traded with kingdoms like Great Zimbabwe to obtain valuable resources such as gold, ivory, and iron, which were the main exports of the region. They imported goods from Asia, including silk, cotton, and porcelain. Swahili city states also exported large amounts of glass beads and pottery.

Imports and Exports of East African City-States
Trade Type	Goods	Description
Exports	Gold, Ivory, Salt, Ebony, Sandalwood, Slaves	These were highly valued resources sent to markets across the Indian Ocean.
Imports	Porcelain, Silk, Spices, Textiles, Beads	Luxurious items brought by merchants from Arabia, India, Persia, China, and Southeast Asia.

== Architecture ==
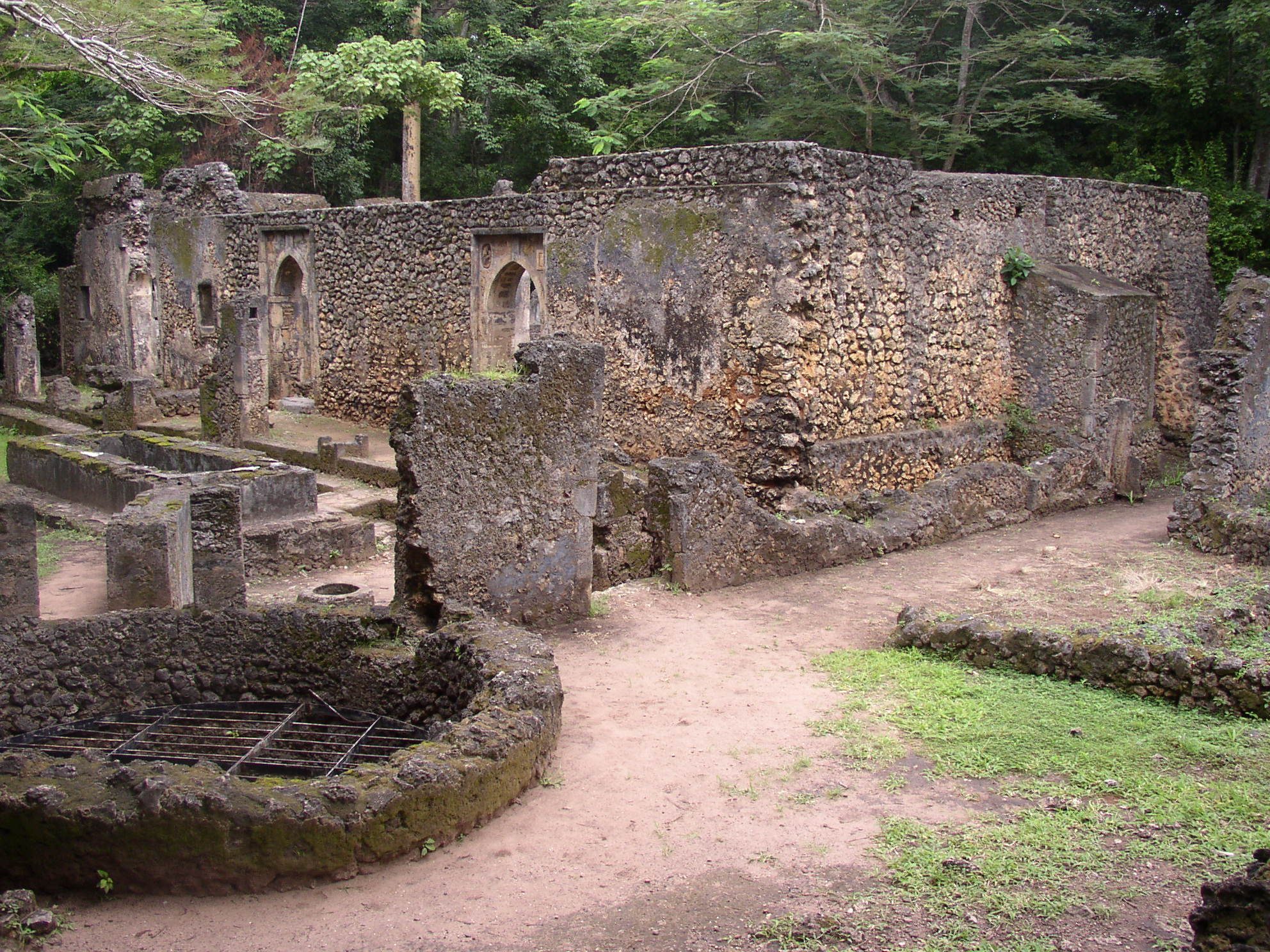
Ruins of Great Mosque of Gede in Kenya

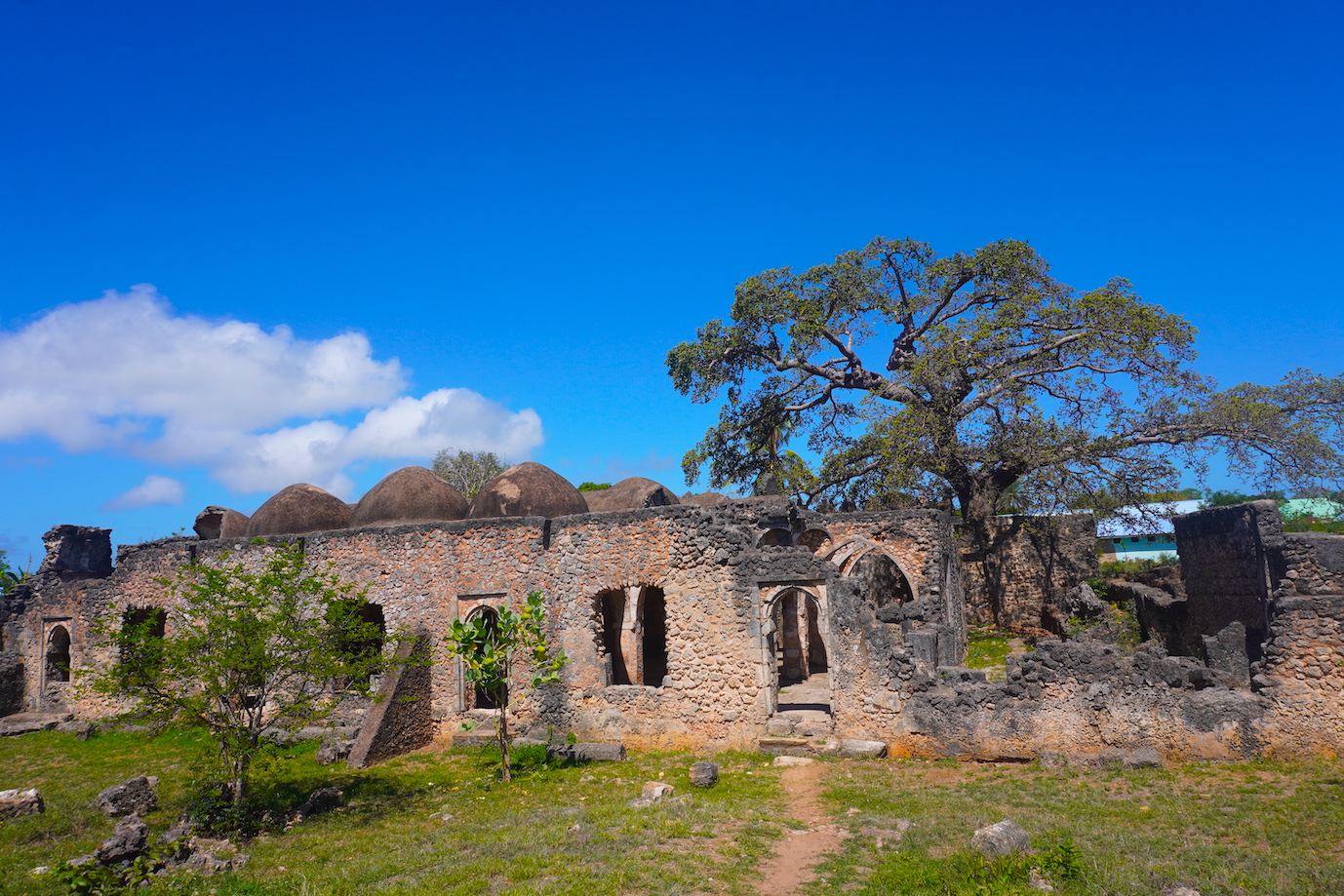
Kilwa Kisiwani ruins in Tanzania

== See also ==
- Ancient Somali city-states
- List of Swahili settlements of the East African coast
- Category:Swahili city-states
