= Maungwe =

Maungwe was a kingdom in Zimbabwe. It was founded by the Makoni Dynasty around 1635. It became a part of the British Mashonaland protectorate in 1889 but its royal line lasted until at least 1896. However the royal line still rules as traditional leaders. The current chief is Cogen Simbayi Gwasira who was crowned in 2014.
