= Nyatsimba Mutota =

Royal of Great Zimbabwe in the mid-15th century

King of Mutapa
- Reign: 1420-1450
- Predecessor: Founder
- Successor: Matope Nyanhehwe Nebedza
- Born: c. 1400; Great Zimbabwe
- Died: c. 1450; Chitakochangonya Hill
- House: Mbire

Nyatsimba Mutota (c. 1400 - c. 1450) was a legendary member of the royal family of Great Zimbabwe in the mid-15th century who is credited with founding the Mutapa Empire to its north, over which he reigned as its first king. Under his leadership, the Empire began a period of military conquest and expansion, which his son would go on to extend as far as the Indian Ocean.

When Nyatsimba was born, the ancient medieval city of Zimbabwe was in severe decline. In his later teenage years, he became a prominent leader of the city.

A salt-shortage in the city caused Nyatsimba to rise up and command his people to move away. They eventually settled in the Northern Dande. From there, Mutota established his dynasty and went on vigorous campaigns to expand the newly-founded Mutapa Empire.

== Biography ==
Nyatsimba Mutota was a member of the Karanga clan of the Shona tribe. He was a representative of the ruling Mbire family. The Mbire had dominated the formation of the state ruled from Great Zimbabwe since its founding by his great-grandfather Mbire, after whom the family took its name. After losing a war with his kinsman Mukwati, he fled the city. However, at that time, Great Zimbabwe was already losing power to a rival with its capital at Ingombe, Ilede (near the Zambezi River in modern Zambia).

== Founding Mutapa ==
According to the oral tradition of the Shona, a salt shortage arose in Great Zimbabwe. That may be a figurative way of speaking of land depletion for pastoralists and agriculturalists or to the deprivations the community faced in general.

Consequently, Nyatsimba Mutota lead a migration to the north-east to establish a new capital in the Daende area, between the Mazoé (now in Mashonaland Central) and the Huniani of the Panhame River (now on the border of Zimbabwe and Mozambique). Large deposits of salt have been found in the Tavar region.

He built the capital near Mount Fura (identified with the current Mount Darwin in Mashonaland Central) in order to be closer to the trading cities of the Kilwa Sultanate. But based upon the location of Mutapa, its founding must have been linked to the royal interest in controlling inland trade coming from the Indian Ocean and competing with Ingombe Ilede on the Zambezi River.

== Reign ==
It was during the reign of Nyatsimba Mutota that the union of tribes transformed into a theocratic state. Mutota assumed the title of mwene mutupa (both a civil and military title meaning Lord of the Conquered Land) and became the high priest of Mwari.

Initially, the population of the Kingdom was largely composed of herders and elephant hunters, not farmers, which made livestock of enormous political importance to the Monomotapa rulers. They gave gifts of livestock to provincial governors to ensure their political support, and sometimes started wars to obtain them.

Around 1440, he began aggressive campaigns against the surrounding tribes, expanding the boundaries of the lands under his control to the west along the Zambezi River. Before his death, he conquered Great Zimbabwe, which remained a cult center. He introduced the tradition of appointing his sons as vassals over conquered lands which were otherwise largely self-governing.

He established strong trade contacts with the cities of Sofala and Mozambique where salt, gold and ivory were sent. He also exchanged cattle for gold with the Bantu peoples in southern Africa (who controlled mines), which he then sent to Arab traders. A geographical reconstruction of the conquests of Mutota and his son reveals a west–east route, the final goal being to seize the downstream part of the Zambezi River, near the sea, in order to be able to exchange salt and ivory with the Portuguese.

Death prevented him from furthering his conquests. He died around 1450 near Pachecho, or Chitakochangonya hill, after a war with a Tonga/Korekore tribe. He was succeeded by his son Matope Nyanhehwe Nebedza.

== Portuguese records ==
In 1861, a Portuguese officer named Albino Manoel Pacheco collected a series of oral testimonies on the origin of Monomotapa and on Mutota. One of those stated: “The history of this country is… obscure. We only know that elephant hunters (Uajero) came from Changoé, led by a resolute black man named Mutota (from the Changamira family), and attracted by the fabrics and salt which were spread in the country… began the conquest of this large territory, without being able to complete it at the same time, because death took their leader from them at the top of the Chitacoxagonha mountain range on the outskirts of the promised land".

== Controversies ==
The existence of Nyatsimba Mutota has been questioned. Some propose he may merely be a personification of the founders of the empire of the Xonas Carangas.

=== Name dispute ===
According to Albino Mael Pacheco, after his death, Mutota was known under the names of Nobesa/Nobeza and Nhantengué, which probably had meanings linked to his prestige and importance, but the exact meaning of these words is unknown. Since there are very few written records about the origins of the Monomotapa Kingdom, there is significant debate over the order and name of the first rulers.

Furthermore, there is another oral tradition, collected by Manoel Pacheco from a noble woman "over a hundred years old" in the 19th century, which names him Nobeza, but which places him as the third ruler of the Monomotapa Empire rather than the fourth (counting from Mbire). The name of his son, traditionally written as “Matope” is also changed to that of Mucuombé. The four genealogical traditions collected by W.G. Randles are:

- Mutota Nemapangere Nemassengere
- Matope Nemangoro Nemangoro
- Mocomba Nobeza Nobeza
- Quesarymgo Mucuombé Nucuombé

The simplest explanation is that the second and third traditions take into account Mutota's ancestors as rulers of Monomotapa. This is not completely accurate, because the founder of Monomotapa as an empire was Mutota himself. Before him, the area was only populated by a small community of shepherds. Regardless, Randles holds Mutota, Nobeza and Nobesa to be the same person.
