= Mavura Mhande Felipe =

Emperor of Mutapa from 1629 to 1652

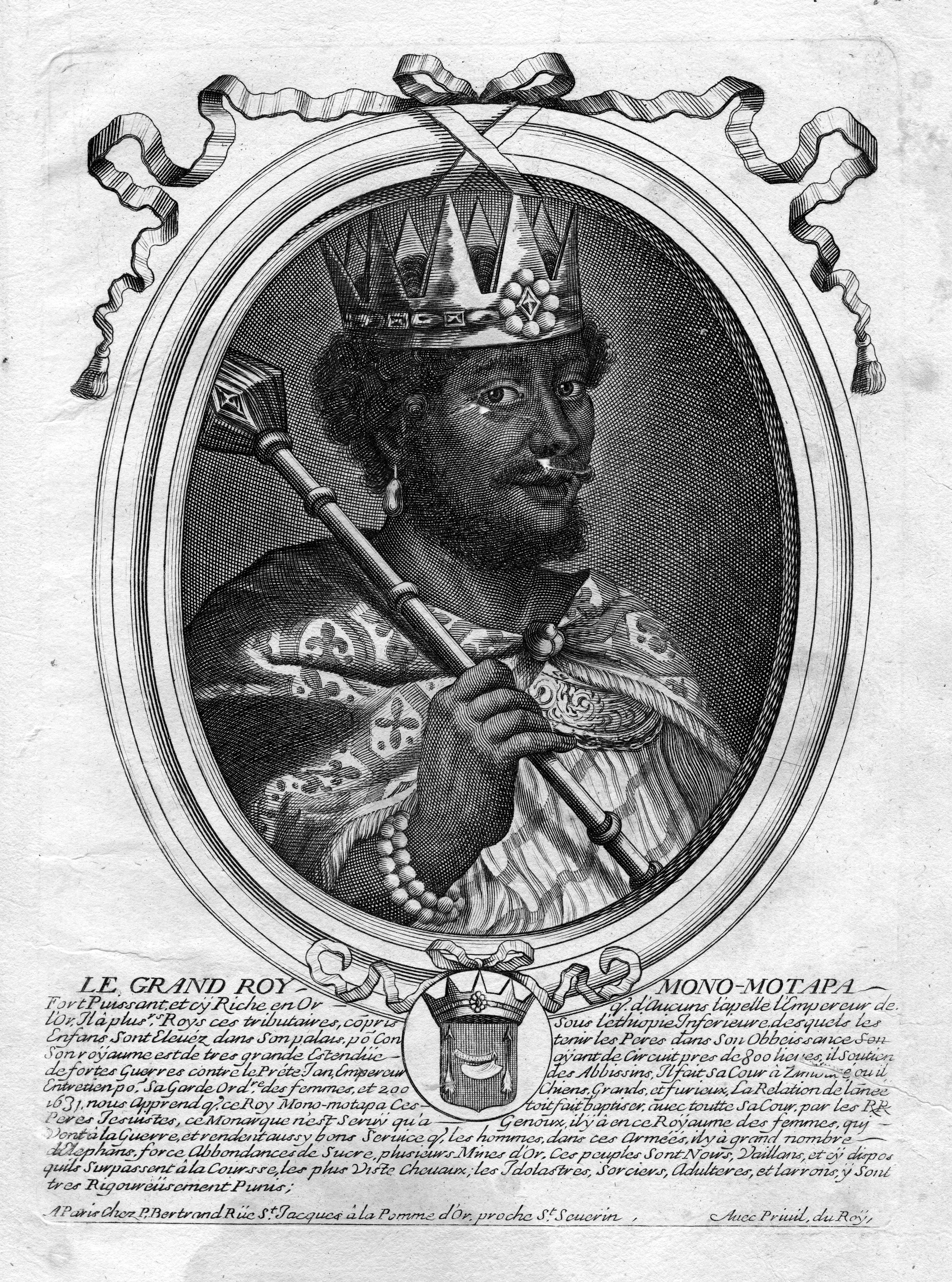
- A c. 1860 illustration
- Occupation: Emperor of Mutapa from 1629 to 1652

Mavura Mhande Felipe, or just Mavura or Filipe, was the emperor (mwenemutapa) of the Mutapa Empire from 1629 to 1652.

By the 1620s, Christianity was spreading to Mutapa through the presence of the Portuguese, who had a trading base in Mozambique. In 1628, Mutapa emperor Nyambo Kapararidze (or Kapranzine) killed the local representative of the King of Portugal and declared war on Christians. Mavura, Kapararidze's nephew, was helped by the Portuguese to overthrow his uncle in 1629; Mavura was installed as emperor. He was not a Christian at that point, but was favorable to their presence. He made Mutapa a Portuguese vassal state. He converted to Christianity (potentially in 1631), and was given the name Filipe by the Portuguese. This helped the Portuguese move further into southeast and central Africa, establishing missionary and trading stations and "[increasing] their share of the trade in gold, copper, ivory, and slaves. Felipe ruled until 1652.
