= Svikiro =

Zimbabwean spirit medium

A svikiro is a spirit medium of the Shona people in Zimbabwe.

A svikiro is an ancestral spirit primarily known to possess a living human and will give advice based on that communication.

The word comes from the verb kusvika meaning "to arrive at or reach a place". It also stems from kusvikirwa meaning "to arrive upon", as it is believed that the ancestral spirits arrive in the bodies of the mediums.

Other types of mediums (svikiro) include mhondoro which are possessed by the ancestor spirits of the same name. Mhondoro means lion in Shona. It is believed that mhondoro spirits reside in the bodies of maneless lions until they have a host to possess. Mhondoro spirits are royal ancestral spirits of deceased chiefs and kings or any other royals. They are believed to be concerned with matter of the clan and territories including the nation.

Roles of the Svikiro

- they are given leading figure in the community and they deal with the welfare of the community at large.
- they mediate between the spiritual world and the human world.
- they protect the society from disturbing factors. they understand some of the life complications and for the society to maintain its equilibrium ...
- they receive visions and dreams
- they make offerings,
- they perform healing rituals
- and they serve as a messenger
