= Mutasa District =

District in Manicaland Province, Zimbabwe

Mutasa
- District
- Location in Zimbabwe
- Coordinates: 18°35′S 32°45′E
- Country: Zimbabwe
- Province: Manicaland
- District: Mutasa

Government
  - MP For Mutasa Central: Trevor Saruwaka
  - MP For Mutasa North: David Anthony Chimhini
  - MP For Mutasa South: Misheck Kagurabadza

Area
  - Total: 2,548 km^{2} (984 sq mi)
- Elevation: 912 m (2,992 ft)

Population (2022 census)
  - Total: 197,808
  - Density: 77.63/km^{2} (201.1/sq mi)
- Time zone: UTC+2 (CAT)

Mutasa District is one of seven districts in Manicaland Province of Zimbabwe. Mutasa District is located 30 km northeast of Mutare and stretches up to the Honde Valley, which is about 100 km northeast of Mutare along a tarred road that branches off the Nyanga road.

== Geography ==
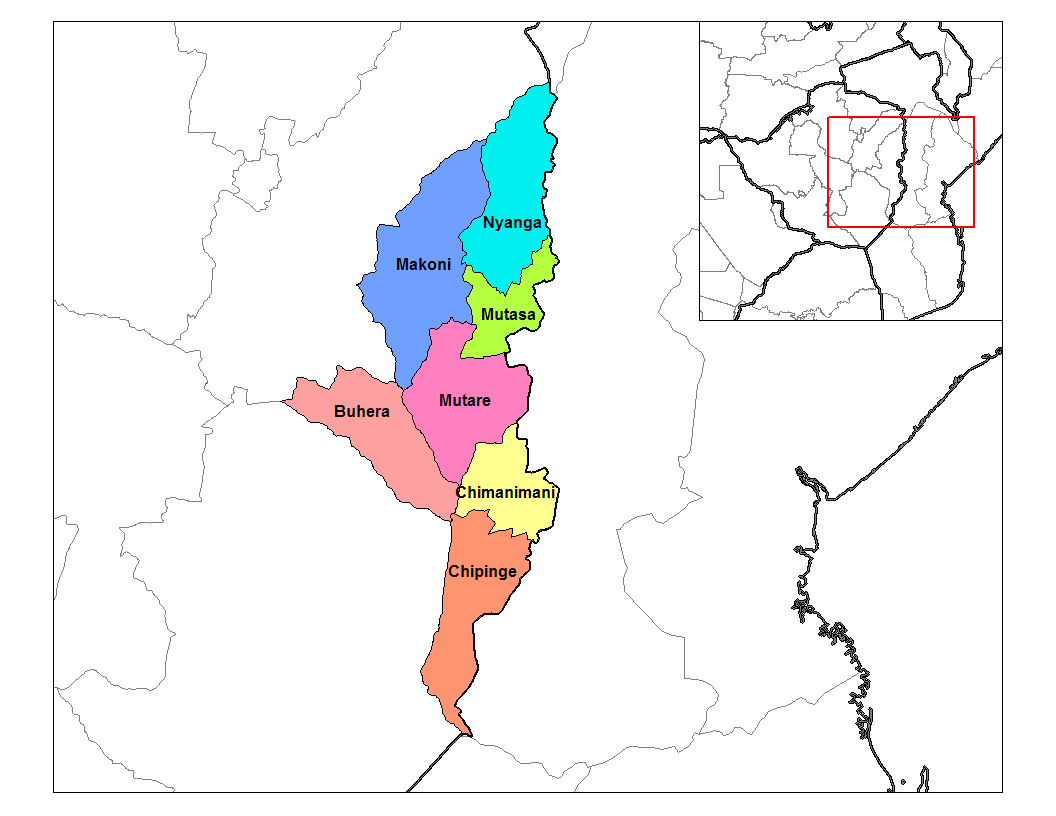
A map of the districts of Manicaland Province

Mutasa District has an area of 2,548 km^{2}. Watsomba is the administrative headquarters. The district is bounded on the south and southwest by Mutare District, on the west by Makoni District, on the north by Nyanga District, and on the east and southeast by Mozambique.

The Nyanga Mountains occupy the northern portion of the district, and a portion of Nyanga National Park lies in the district. Mount Nyangani (2,592 m), the highest peak in Zimbabwe, is located in the national park.

The northeastern corner of the district is in the upper watershed of the Gairezi River, which originates on Mt Nyangani and flows northward to meet the Zambezi.

The Pungwe River also originates on Mount Nyangani. The Honde Valley lies south of the Nyanga Mountains, and is drained by the Honde River, a tributary of the Pungwe. South of the Honde Valley, a range whose highest peaks are Mt Rupere (2,030 m) and Mt Chinyamariro (1900 m) divides the Honde valley from the Nyamkukwarara Valley, which is drained by the Nyamkukwarara River, another Pungwe tributary. Steep-sided Mt Gurungwe (1,885 m), on the Mozambican border, bounds the Nyamkukawara Valley on the east. The Pungwe, Honde, and Nyamkukwarara all drain northeastwards into Mozambique.

The western part of the district lies in the upper basin of the Odzi River, a tributary of the Save River. Osborne Dam is on the Odzi.

== Population ==
The 2022 census recorded a population of 197,808 for the district.

=== Townships and villages ===
- Chijara village
- Chipupuri village
- Hauna village
- Kwambana village
- Muponda village
- Old Mutare Mission
- Penhalonga
- Stapleford
- Watsomba
- Zindi township

== Economy ==
Mutasa District's economy is agriculture-based. Villagers practice semi-commercial agriculture. And the district has several plantations and estates that provide employment. Villages raise cattle, goats and chickens. They grow maize, groundnuts, sugarcane etc. and have plantations for fruit trees in the fields. Some of the villages are small landholder growers of coffee, tea and banana plantations. Large scale commercial plantations produce timber, coffee and tea estates.

== Infrastructure ==
Compared with other districts in Manicaland Province, Mutasa District has better infrastructure.

=== Road network ===
The district is serviced by a network of surfaced and gravel roads. The main highways are the Mutare–Nyanga A15 highway, and the Selbourne to Honde Valley road. During the rainy season some parts of the district are inaccessible by road due to the bad state of roads. The district council does not have the capacity to maintain gravel roads, hence the District Development Fund is now maintaining most of the gravel roads. In Honde Valley some areas are only accessible only by four-wheel-drive enabled vehicles due to the terrain.

=== Communication technology ===
Most of the district is covered by wireless or cell phone networks, although mountainous areas of the district have poor reception. Land telephone lines connect most of the business centres throughout the district. Villages and business centers with telephone services have access to the internet.

=== Dams and water infrastructure ===
Mutasa District is in the Highveld, receiving high rainfall, hence there are a number of small to large dams in the district, the major ones being Osborne Dam on the Odzi and Nyawamba Dam in Honde Valley. The Pungwe–Mutare pipeline, which delivers water from the upper Pungwe River to the city of Mutare, passes through the district, and the district is still to benefit from water points along the route. It is proving expensive for local communities to access the piped water from the Pungwe along the way to Mutare interims of acquiring the right pipes for their irrigations. The Odzani and Smallbridge dams on the Odzani River, a tributary of the Odzi, also supply water to Mutare. Odzani dam, built in 1967, created Lake Alexander, which is also used for water recreation.

In Honde Valley, water supplied from by a number of small piped systems and motorised pumps serving small towns, growth points, commercial plantations, service centres and some villages, as well as direct abstractions from the rivers by riparian village communities not connected to developed installations.

=== Sanitation ===
Up to 90% of the population has Blair pit latrines, and the rest have water-borne sewer system. Most of the Blair pit latrines were constructed after independence in 1980.

== Government and politics ==
Mutasa District is divided into three National Assembly constituencies: Mutasa Central, Mutasa North, and Mutasa South. The MPs are Trevor Saruwaka, Chido Mwadiwa, and Misheck Kagurabadza respectively.

Mutasa District is divided between two Senate constituencies. Mutasa Central and Mutasa North are part of Nyanga-Mutasa constituency, and Mutasa South is part of Mutare constituency.

== Education ==
Mutasa has a number of schools and tertiary institutions run by the Ministry of Education, Mutasa Rural District Council, Missions and Private players.

=== Primary schools ===
- Sagambe Primary School
- Chavhanga Primary School
- Pachije St Stephen Primary
- Chikomba Primary School
- Chisuko Primary School
- Aberfoyle Primary School
- Eastern Highlands Primary Schools
- Katiyo Primary School
- Nyamhingura Primary School
- Muterere Primary School
- Muparutsa Primary School
- Zindi Primary School
- St James Haparari Primary School
- Vumbunu Primary School
- Sherukuru Primary School
- St Francis Pimayi Primary School
- Chitombo Primary School
- Gatsi Primary School
- Buwu Primary School
- St Columbus Primary School
- Samutete St Michaels Primary School
- Rupinda Primary School
- Muchena Primary School
- Triashill Mission School
- Chitombo Primary School
- Sahumani Primary School
- Makwasa Primary School
- Kwambana Primary School
- Manunure Primary School
- Honde river
- Samaringa
- Costern
- Nyamaende
- St Peters Jombe Primary School
- Holy Family School Nyatsanza Primary School
- Mapfekera Primary School
- Berthania Primary School
- St Barbara's Mission school
- St Johns Zambe Primary School
- Tsvingwe Primary School
- Samanga Primary School
- St Exavier Chikumbu Primary School
- Muponda Primary School
- Domborutinhira Primary School
- Moyoweshumba Primary
- Chidazembe Primary School
- Mapara Primary School

=== Secondary schools ===
- Sagambe Secondary School
- Chavhanga Secondary School
- Chisuko Secondary School
- Muterere Secondary School
- Zindi Secondary School
- St Columbus Secondary School
- Nyamhingura Secondary
- St Mathias Tsonzo Secondary School
- St James Zongoro Secondary School
- Mwoyoweshumba Secondary School
- Nyakatsapa High School
- Gatsi Secondary School
- Sahumani

Rupinda Secondary School

- Chitombo
- Pafiwa Mutasa
- Hartzell High School
- Samaringa Secondary School
- Triashill Mission
- St Barabara's sec school
- Zambe Secondary School
- Sherukuru High School
- Muparutsa Secondary School

=== Tertiary institutions ===
The district has a tertiary institution at Bonda and Honde Valley Mission. Africa University is also located in the District.

== Health care ==
Zimbabwe's public health care is delivered at four levels, which are meant to function as a referral chain. The first level is the primary level consisting of Rural Health Centres, Rural Hospitals and Urban Clinics (services do not require an attending Physician). The second level is the first referral level consisting of District Hospitals. The third level is the second referral level consisting of Provincial and General Hospitals. The fourth and final level is the third referral level to Central and Special Hospitals.

Most of the health care facilities in the district are owned and run by the government's Ministry of Health and Child Welfare, although local communities are involved in the management of some clinics. The main referral hospitals are Hauna Hospital and Bonda Mission Hospital. There are several poly-clinics in the district that offer primary health care to people from the villages in the district. In recent years as the economy of Zimbabwe has declined, there has been a shortage of drugs and equipment at the hospitals although staffing levels by end of 2010 had improved. Communities also rely heavily on traditional medicines. The major diseases that affect the people in the district include diarrhea, TB and malaria.

=== HIV/AIDS ===
Like the rest of the country, the HIV/AIDS pandemic is seriously affecting the district. However, there has been a decrease of reported HIV prevalence rate in the past decade.

=== Hospitals ===
Hauna hospital, run through the Ministry of Health was established in Honde valley as there was no district Hospital in the District and the only Mission Hospital at Bonda could not meet the District Health Demands. It's now a referral Hospital for most health centres in the Valley with major cases being referred to Mutare General Hospital which happens to be the Provincial hospital

== Tourist attractions ==
- Mutarazi Falls is one tourist attraction in Honde Valley. The valley scenery is also a tourist attraction.
- Mahwemasimike, meaning "planted rocks", are rock pinnacles to the north of Hauna Growth Point in Mukupe Village, Muparutsa Chieftaincy.
- Pungwe River white water rafting
- Aberfoyle Lodge, Hauna

== Religion ==
Christianity dominates in Mutasa. Most people are Catholics (Anglicans, Methodists and Roman Catholics). African Apostolic Church (AAC) known as vekwa (Mwazha) large group also is a follower of the Johanne Marange Apostolic Sect. Traditional beliefs are still prevalent, although people now practise them side-by-side with Christianity.

== Notable people ==
- Oppah Muchinguri
- Herbert Chitepo
- Giles Mutsekwa
