= Juliasdale =

- Location in Zimbabwe
- Coordinates: 18°22′03″S 32°40′48″E
- Country: Zimbabwe
- Province: Manicaland
- Districts of Zimbabwe: Nyanga District
- Municipality: Juliasdale Town Council
- Elevation: 6,100 ft (1,860 m)
- Climate: Cwb

Juliasdale is a resort town in Manicaland, Zimbabwe. It is situated in the foothills of the Nyanga mountains in eastern Zimbabwe

== Location ==
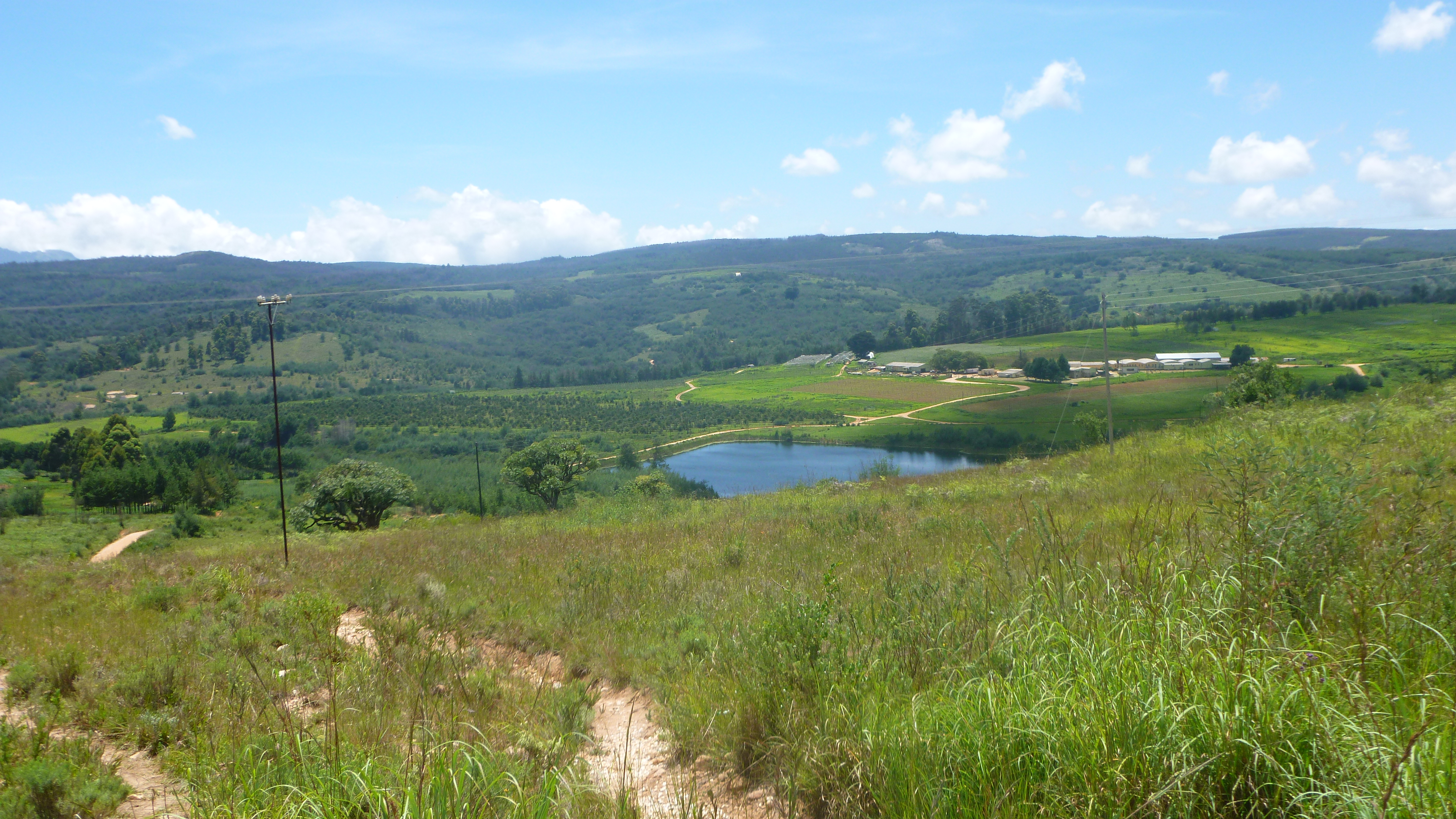
Claremont Estates, a commercial farming area, is just north of Juliasdale.

It is located approximately 24 kilometres (15 mi), by road, southwest of the town of Nyanga, where the district headquarters are located. This location lies approximately 83 kilometres (52 mi), by road, directly south of Mutare, the location of the provincial headquarters. The coordinates of Juliasdale are: 18° 22' 3.00"S, 32° 40' 48.00"E (Latitude:18.3675; Longitude:32.6800). Juliasdale is located in the Eastern Highlands, close to the international border with Mozambique. Its location lies within the confines of Nyanga National Park.

== Overview ==
Juliasdale is home to the first casino in the country. The mountainous town is an attractive destination for tourism. Forestry and fruit are farmed in the region. ZB Bank Limited, a commercial bank, maintains a branch in the town.

== Tourism ==
Located on the foothills of the Nyanga mountains, Juliasdale is surrounded by soaring mountains, crisp clean air and gentle streams, a number of charming country cottages and farms. Juliasdale attracts bird watchers, hikers, star gazers and fly fishing enthusiasts. Wild trout and yellowfish are found in abundance in the streams and rivers in the area.

== Population ==
The current population of Juliasdale is not publicly known. A national population census in Zimbabwe was scheduled from 18 August through 28 August 2012.

== Geography ==
=== Climate ===
Juliasdale has a temperate highland climate (Cwb, according to the Köppen climate classification), with mild summers and chilly, dry winters, with winter frosts. The average annual precipitation is 1,226 mm (48 in), with most rainfall occurring mainly during spring and summer.

== See also ==
- Mount Nyangani
- Eastern Highlands
- Manyika people
