= Watsomba =

Coordinates: 18°41′S 32°38′E

Watsomba is a business and market centre in the province of Manicaland, Zimbabwe located 42 km north of the city of Mutare on the main Mutare-Nyanga road. It is an administrative and trading centre for Mutasa District and the Mutasa and Manyika communal lands.

There are villages serviced by this centre namely, Marira, Mvere, Nyatsanza, Danhama, Vumbunu, Tsonzo, just to mention a few. Around Watsomba are many small scale farms engaged in intensive farming that includes fruit, vegetables, corn, dairy, honey, and paprika. There are plans underway to grow cotton in the area. This initiative might be a brain child of the Nyanganis who have working knowledge of cotton growing. One of the famous people in this area was Lorieta Makahushaya Tsandukwa who was a farmer and a traditional healer. During her days her homestead was frequently visited by clients from the capital city of Harare in pursuit of her traditional healing prowess. She died in 1993 at the age of 60.

Like most places in Zimbabwe, the areas around Watsomba are fully electrified and there are several cellular towers visible on mountain tops. The place is expanding with several new shops being constructed around the old established businesses.

== Schools ==
There are several schools, namely St Matthias Tsonzo, Pafiwa, Vumbunu, Nyakatsapa, Mutasa, Moyoweshumba, Sherikuru, Bethania, Magadzire, Mapfekera and Zinyemba just to mention a few that are within this small community and as a result the level of education is very high. Almost every household has sent their children to college. This is a very progressive place. To the south is St. Mathias Tsonzo is a full boarding high school with up to A-Level studies. It is an Anglican missionary school. To the north is a Methodist missionary school named, Nyakatsapa High School that is also a full boarding school with A level studies.

== Demographics ==
At Watsomba, which is the service center, there are banks, supermarkets, bars, a beer distributor, a dairy collection ad sales center and a farmer's coop. Transportation is very efficient; it takes 25 minutes to be at the heart of Mutare from Watsomba.

The common language is the Manyika dialect of the Shona language.
