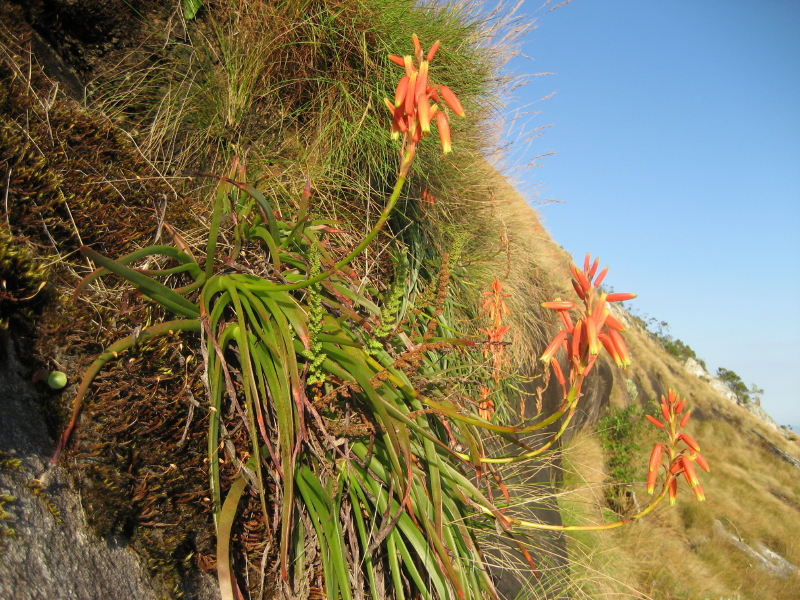

Conservation status
- Least Concern (IUCN 3.1)
- CITES Appendix II

Scientific classification
- Kingdom: Plantae
- Clade: Tracheophytes
- Clade: Angiosperms
- Clade: Monocots
- Order: Asparagales
- Family: Asphodelaceae
- Subfamily: Asphodeloideae
- Genus: Aloe
- Species: A. inyangensis

Binomial name
- Aloe inyangensis Christian

= Aloe inyangensis =

Species of succulent

Aloe inyangensis is a succulent aloe plant species, found only in the mountainous Eastern Highlands of Zimbabwe. It grows best in shady conditions but in some areas is also found in the open in heaths on mountain tops. There are two subspecies: the relatively flimsy A. inyangensis inyangensis commoner in the northern part of the range; and the sturdier A. inyangensis kimberleyana towards the southern end of its range.

== Appearance ==
This aloe is a small herbaceous plant with stiff, succulent strap-shaped leaves that belie the humid and perennially wet conditions that it grows under. It grows in rather untidy-looking clumps up to 20–30 cm high. The leaves are thin, about 18–28 cm long and often bent forwards along the central vein. Unlike most aloe species, A inyangensis blooms throughout the year. The flowers are a very attractive crimson colour, borne on 30 cm curved stalks above the foliage.

== Distribution ==
The plant is strictly confined to woodland and wet forest on mountain sides above 1500 m altitude from just north of Nyanga southwards to Mount Rupere and Mount Ruinji near Stapleford in northern Manicaland. It grows almost up to the summit of Mount Inyangani. Another population occurs about 40 km further south on and around the Castle Beacon mountain in the Bvumba mountains. Despite its limited distribution it is relatively common in its own environment and specimens are relatively easy to spot.
