= Honde =

Honde refers to:

- Honde, a cultivar of Karuka
- Honde River, a river in Zimbabwe and Mozambique
- Honde Valley, the African valley containing the Honde River
- Steph Honde (born 1975), French musician
