= World's View, Nyanga =

Vista in the Eastern Highlands, Zimbabwe

Coordinates: 18.163743°S 32.774419°E

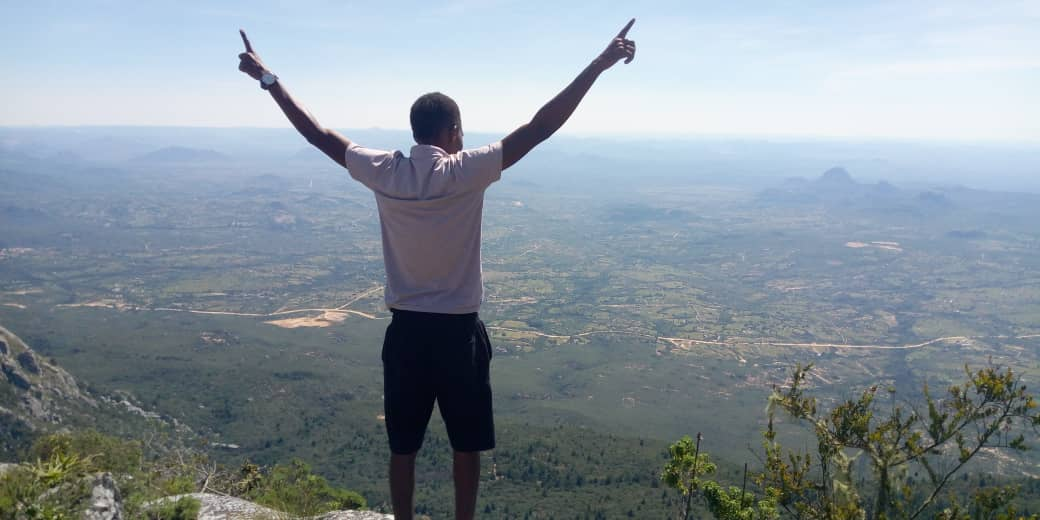
- World's View Nyanga
- Interactive map of World's View, Nyanga
- Location: Nyanga, Zimbabwe
- Governing body: National Trust of Zimbabwe

World's View is a vista on the escarpment of the Nyanga Downs plateau in the Eastern Highlands mountain range, just north of Nyanga, in eastern Zimbabwe. It is situated at an altitude of 2,248 metres (7,375 ft) with a 600 metres (2,000 ft) drop to the plain below on the western side.

== Description ==
A tower at the viewpoint bears a toposcope on which the direction and distance to thirty African localities are inscribed on slabs of black granite. A site office stands nearby with a small gallery, built in 2012 to house pictures of the flowers of Nyanga by local artist Mary Clark and a display on the history of the development of the viewpoint. The Kirstenbosch National Botanical Garden in Cape Town, South Africa, has contributed plants for a protea and wild flower garden created in a rocky kopje adjoining the gallery.

The National Trust of Zimbabwe manages the World's View site, which covers an area of about 70 hectares. Although the viewpoint itself is of modern origins, having been developed in the 1950s, the site was occupied as long ago as the 14th and 15th centuries. Some of the peaks along the edge of the escarpment, from World's View to Chirimanyimo Hill, are crowned by large stonewalled settlements at altitudes of over 2,000 metres. They were probably the site of villages and would have been built during a cooler and drier climatic period, when the mountains were less persistently misty than they are today.

== Access ==
The viewpoint is just outside the northern edge of the Nyanga National Park and can be reached via an 11 km track from Troutbeck. On a clear day, places as far away as 60 to 70 km can be seen.
