= Mutasa =

Mutasa may refer to:

- Didymus Mutasa
- Mutasa District in Manicaland Province, Zimbabwe
