= Sadomba Women Cattle Project =

The Sadomba cattle project is an agricultural initiative created by the women of the village of Sadomba in Nyanga District, Manicaland Province, Zimbabwe, with the Ministry of Women Affairs, Gender and Community Development and the United Nations' Women empowerment and Community Development Programmes. Manicaland Province mobilized communities for cattle production in an effort to increase the national herd after devastating droughts and the country’s economic crisis. This initiative also addresses poverty issues in communities and enhances food security. Sadomba Project in Nyanga was one project identified by the province.
