= Battle of Hill 31 =

Battle in the Rhodesian bush war

- Part of the Rhodesian Bush War (or Second Chimurenga)
- Battle of Hill 31 (Zimbabwe)
Date	15 November 1976
Location	Honde Valley, Rhodesia
Result	Rhodesian victory

Belligerents
Rhodesia	ZANLA

Commanders and leaders
(Rhodesia) Cap. Chris "Kip" Donald	Unknown

Units involved
Rhodesian Army; RLI; 3 Commando; RR; K Company; RhAF	Unknown

Strength
At least 100 Troops; 1 Lynx (Call Sign Alpha 4); 4 Alouette III (1 K-Car) (3 G-Cars)	32–40 cadres

Casualties and losses
1 killed 3 wounded 1 helicopter damaged	31 killed 1 captured

The Battle of Hill 31 took place between the Rhodesian security forces and ZANU insurgents- who had crossed the Rhodesian border with Mozambique on 15 November 1976.
