= Protea asymmetrica =

Conservation status
- Near Threatened (IUCN 3.1)

Scientific classification
- Kingdom: Plantae
- Clade: Embryophytes
- Clade: Tracheophytes
- Clade: Angiosperms
- Clade: Eudicots
- Order: Proteales
- Family: Proteaceae
- Genus: Protea
- Species: P. asymmetrica

Binomial name
- Protea asymmetrica Beard

Species of flowering plant

Protea asymmetrica, also known as the Inyanga sugarbush, is a flowering plant, named for its asymmetric flowerheads, of the family Proteaceae and endemic to Zimbabwe and the Nyanga region, where it grows in grasslands, as well as Mount Nyangani.

It reaches a height of up to 1.6 m (5 ft 3 in), and mainly flowers from June to August. The plant sprouts after a fire, and grows on grassland at a height of around 2,000 m (6,600 ft).

== See also ==
- List of Protea species
