= Massi Kessi =

Town in Manicaland, Zimbabwe

Coordinates: 18°58′S 32°40′E

Massi Kessi (Portuguese: Macequece) is a town in Mozambique, near Zimbabwe border (and almost a suburb of) Mutare in the Manicaland province in Zimbabwe, on the road and railway to Beira.

== Geography ==
Massi Kessi is located at an altitude of 600m. It is surrounded by the gold fields of Manica.

== History ==
Massi Kessi was the headquarters of the Portuguese in Manica, who are considered the first Europeans to settle this area of the world (starting in 1520). In the 1880s, as the British are eyeing on Portuguese territories in East Africa, the Kingdom sent the artillery captain Joaquim Carlos Paiva de Andrada to restore the Portuguese outposts scattered in the region. He obtained the authorization to extract and sell minerals, and created the Companhia de Moçambique in December 1888. The company reconstructed a fort in Massi Kessi where it established its headquarters.

A conflict took place in Massi Kessi on November 5, 1890 and again on May 11, 1891 between the Portuguese and the British South Africa Company, which led to the capture of the fort Massi Kessi that had been abandoned by the Portuguese.

As a result, the British government pushed through the Manika Treaty on June 11, 1891, that ensured ownership of Manica by the British South Africa Company; until then, the Portuguese colonial area had extended to the Mazoetal river, almost to Harare, Shamv and Mount Darwin.
