= Troutbeck, Manicaland =

Village in Zimbabwe

Troutbeck is a village in the province of Manicaland, Zimbabwe located in the Eastern Highlands on the northern border of Nyanga National Park and situated on a highland plateau at an altitude of about 2100m.

== Tourism ==
Troutbeck village has a small shopping centre in the town and about 10 minutes' walk to the north is a church built by Italian prisoners of war in the 1940s. It has a thriving four star hotel, Troutbeck Resort. Troutbeck is popular with anglers as fresh water trout (which have been introduced into local streams) can be caught. Adjacent to Troutbeck Resort is a popular shop called 'Santa's Grotto', which sells mainly homemade goods by the residents in Troutbeck and the owners of the shop itself.

== Scenery ==
Troutbeck is high in the mountains and the land slopes downwards to the north with views of the Nyangui mountain range. Because of its height the western edge of Troutbeck's plateau is dubbed 'World's View' where the edge of the escarpment allows visitors to behold a wide vista and, with the help of small engraved granite plaques around the edge of the tower, see the direction of certain towns in Zimbabwe and South Africa and their distance from World's View.

== Events since 2000 ==
The number of people visiting Troutbeck since the land reform program in 2000 has dropped dramatically mainly due to the decreasing number of wealthy land owners who could afford to stay in Troutbeck. Many of the farms in the surrounding areas have been taken over by the 'war veterans' and they have made it less safe for some people in the country to visit Troutbeck.

In 2023, a heavy rains would lead to a landslide blocking the road accessing Troutbeck.
