= Honde Valley =

Valley in Zimbabwe and Mozambique

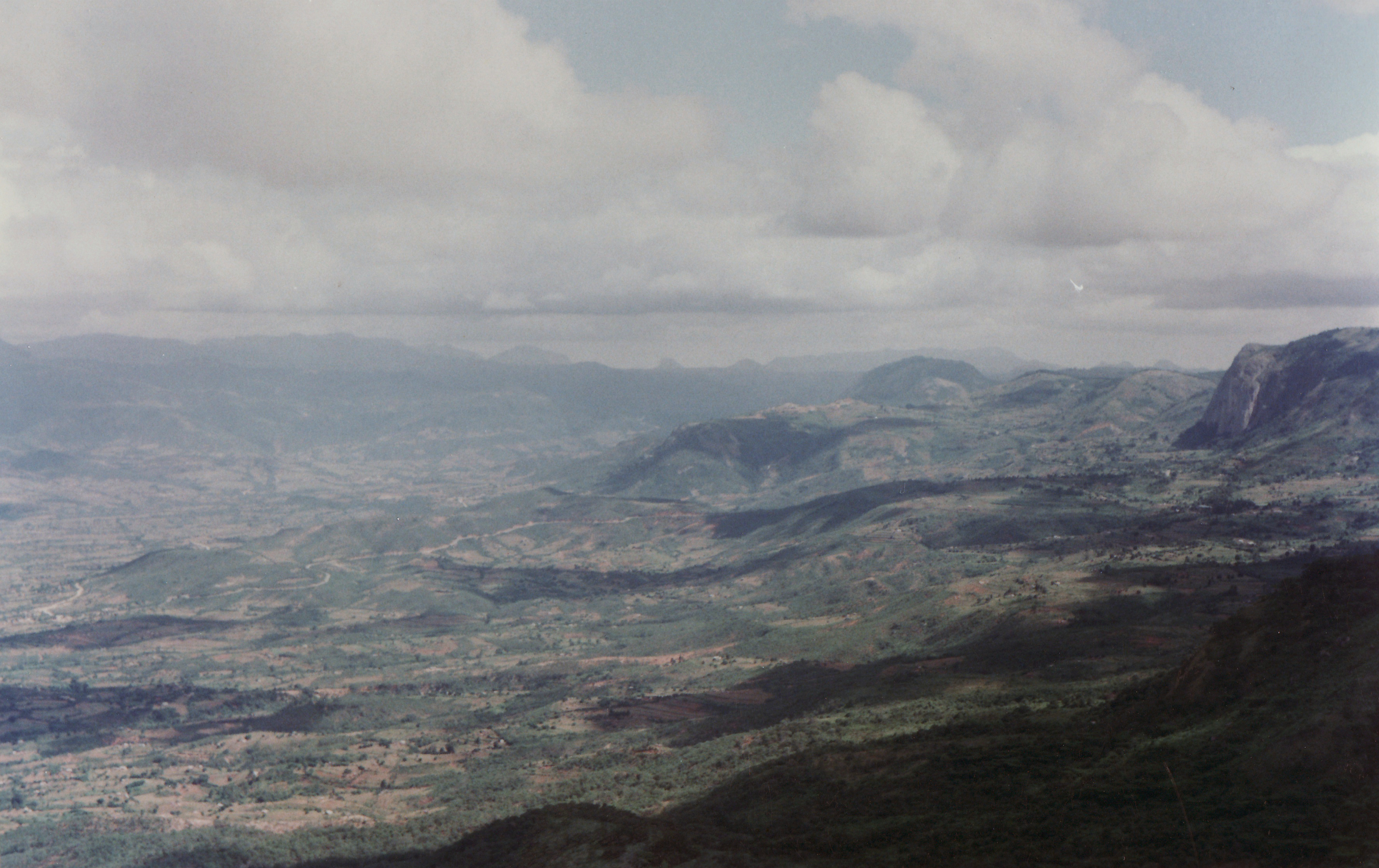
- Honde Valley in 1996

- Location within Zimbabwe
- Floor elevation: 780 m (2,560 ft)at Hauna

Geography
- Location: Zimbabwe
- Coordinates: 18°29′48.40″S 32°51′11.52″E
- Interactive map of Honde Valley

The Honde Valley extends from the eastern border of Zimbabwe into Mozambique. The valley is part of the Eastern Highlands. The valley is about 130 kilometres (81 miles) from Mutare, or 110 kilometres (68 miles) from Nyanga. The Nyanga Mountains and the Nyanga National Park form the western boundary of the valley.

== Access ==
Approaching from Mutare, the turn-off is about 50 km along the road towards Nyanga. The road into the valley is tarred and twists and turns steeply as it drops 800 meters in about 20 km. Off the tarred road, there are good dust roads which service most parts of the Valley.

== Geography ==
=== Climate ===
The climate of Honde Valley falls is mostly temperate. From late October to around the end of April it is summer, the weather is hot and humid. Temperatures may rise to 28 ˚C when most of the rainfall is received. From May to the beginning of July, the winter season, the temperatures are Low and they may hover around minimums of 2 ˚C while From September to October during spring, it is hot with maximum temperatures averaging around 25 to 30 ˚C. Most of the rain experienced is convective. Orographic rain falls at various times of the year, in addition to the normal convective rain. This area of the country receives some of the highest rainfall in Zimbabwe due to its location in Region 1 of the country's 5 regions. Region 1 receives the largest amount of rain. As the area is in the highlands, winters tend to be cold but overall, the region has a pleasant climate.

=== Topography ===
The average altitude of Honde Valley is around 900 m above sea-level compared to its immediate surroundings which rise above 1800 m. This abrupt drop in topography creates the spectacular Mtarazi and adjacent Muchururu Falls.

=== Flora ===
The 500 square kilometres of the Honde Valley in Zimbabwe are extensively cultivated, often with gravity fed irrigation channels. Extensive use is made of the many smaller tributaries feeding into the Pungwe River in this portion of the Honde Valley.

=== Fauna ===
The Honde Valley is one of the premier birding destinations in Zimbabwe, offers a wide range of species difficult to find in most other parts of the region, other than in neighbouring Mozambique. This fertile valley lies 850 m above sea level and is one of the major tea producing areas of Zimbabwe.

Specials: Anchieta's tchagra, moustached grass-warbler, red-winged warbler, black-winged bishop, red-faced crimsonwing, lesser seedcracker, singing cisticola, twinspot indigobird which parasitizes the red-throated twinspot, scarce swift, pallid honeyguide, green-backed woodpecker, stripe-cheeked greenbul, yellow-streaked greenbul, silvery-cheeked hornbill, white-eared barbet, pale batis, black-throated wattle-eye, variable sunbird, bronzy sunbird, olive sunbird, yellow-bellied waxbill, grey waxbill, blue-spotted wood-dove, black-fronted bush-shrike.

Habitats: Lowland and riverine forest, marsh, miombo woodland, tea estate, maize lands.

Birding: There are four main birding areas in the valley, the area around Aberfoyle Club; Gleneagles Nature Reserve above the Club, eastern Highland Tea Estate; and Katiyo Tea Estate some 25 km from Aberfoyle.

=== Water resources ===
The water supply for the Honde Valley comprises small piped systems and motorised pumps serving small towns, growth points, commercial plantations, service centres and some villages, as well as direct abstractions from the rivers by riparian village communities not connected to developed installations.

There are a total of about seven small to medium-sized metered piped water systems at Hauna, Sachisuko, Honde Army, Zindi, Samanga, Mpotedzi and Sahumani. In addition there are other smaller un-metered water supply schemes that serve a number of villages and schools. The known smaller un-metered water supply schemes are Honde “Povo” Pipe Scheme, Chingaira Piped Scheme, St Columbus Secondary School, Sagambe Primary and Secondary School, Marige Water Project, Mahobo Piped Scheme and Mupenga Gravity Water Scheme.

== Economy ==
The area is low-lying and hot, it is a banana, tea and coffee growing area. The Katiyo, Aberfoyle, Rumbizi and Chiwira Tea Estates are situated in the valley. However, it is home to many small scale and subsistence farmers who have since 2011 switched mainly to Banana production. There are several non-motorized irrigation schemes in Honde valley.

=== Electricity generation ===
Electricity generating projects have constructed, supplying ZESA, namely the Nyamhingura, Duru, Pungwe A, B & C and Hauna Power Stations. All are managed by Nyangani Renewable Energy (Pvt) Ltd, with an installed capacity of 27 MW; Annual average output of 80 GWh.

=== Tea estates ===
- Eastern Highlands Tea Estate

=== Business centers ===
- Hauna Growth point – Hauna Growth point is located in the Honde Valley communal land about 95 km north of Mutare. It is the Growth Point Centre for Mutasa District in Manicaland. There is an aerodrome where small aeroplanes can land and take off. There is also a Police camp called Ruda Police Station which controls all police activities in that part of Mutasa District. There is also Hauna Hospital. It can be reached by a tarred road from Mutare and cellphone coverage is also available on the net-one, telecel and econet networks. Hauna Growth point got its name from the group of stores called Hauna Stores. Hauna literally means "you don't have". The group of stores included a Service Station, a General Dealership, Rentals, A Wholesale and a Bakery and together supplied Honde Valley with products ranging from food, to twine, household items, clothing and much more. The Hauna dealership was founded by Masiiwa Matendana Mwandayi in the 1950s. The earliest known record in the form of a paid shop licence dates back to 1953. The area eventually went on to be called Hauna but was initially known as "KWaMwandayi" after Masiiwa Matendana Mwandayi's shops which were also known as "kwaMwandayi" at the time.
- Zindi Business centre

== Education ==
Honde Valley has a number of schools and tertiary institutions.

=== Secondary schools ===
- Sagambe High School
- Chavhanga Secondary School
- Chisuko Secondary School
- Muterere High School
- St Columbus High School
- Munyuku Secondary School
- Nyamhingura Secondary
- Ngarura Secondary School
- Gatsi High School
- Rupinda Secondary School
- St Peters Mandeya Secondary School
- Sahumani Secondary School
- Samaringa High School
- Muparutsa Secondary School
- St Peters Jombe Secondary School

=== Tertiary institutions ===
- Honde Mission Technical Training College
- Dzidzai Technical College

== Hospitals and clinics ==
- Hauna District Hospital
- Chisuko Clinic
- Sagambe Clinic
- Katiyo Tea Estate Clinic
- Chavhanga Clinic
- St Peter's Mandeya Clinic
- Gatsi Clinic
- Sahumani Clinic
- Chitombo Clinic
- Honde Green / Mpotedzi Clinic
- Samaringa Clinic
- Jombe Clinic
- Samanga Clinic
- Ngarura Clinic
- Rupinda Clinic
- Hauna Clinic
- Honde Mission Clinic
- Samanga Clinic
- Kwambana Clinic
- Zindi Clinic

=== See also ===
- Mahwemasimike
- Mtarazi Falls - The longest falls in Zimbabwe coming from Nyanga which falls into the Honde River.
- Pungwe River – fishing and white water rafting
- Nyanga National Park
- Honde River
- Nyawamba Dam- fishing
- Chipote (Kapunga) Falls
- Honde View – a good view of attractive fauna

== See also ==
- Geography of Zimbabwe
