= Manicaland Province =

Coordinates: 19°00′S 32°30′E

Manicaland: Dunhu reManicaland (Shona); Isabelo seManicaland (Northern Ndebele)
- Province
- Nickname: kumakomoyo (to those mountain)
- Manicaland, Province of Zimbabwe
- Country: Zimbabwe
- Manicaland: 1897
- Capital: Mutare

Government
  - Type: Provincial Ministry
  - Minister of State for Provincial Affairs: Misheck Mugadza (ZANU-PF)
  - Provincial Administrator: Fungai Mbetsa
  - Provincial Affairs Director: not known

Area
  - Total: 36,459 km^{2} (14,077 sq mi)
- Highest elevation: 2,592 m (8,504 ft)

Population (2022)
  - Total: 2,037,762
  - Estimate (2023): 2,098,110
  - Density: 55.892/km^{2} (144.76/sq mi)
- Demonym: VekuMakomoyo (those from mountainous area)
- Time zone: UTC+02:00 (CAT)
  - Summer (DST): UTC+01:00 (CAT)
- HDI (2021): 0.583 low · 6th

Manicaland is a province in eastern Zimbabwe. After Harare Province, it is the country's second-most populous province, with a population of 2.037 million, as of the 2022 census, making it the third most densely populated province after Harare and Bulawayo provinces. Manicaland was one of five original provinces established in Southern Rhodesia in the early colonial period. The province endowed with country's major tourist attractions, the likes of Mutarazi Falls, Nyanga National Park and Zimbabwe's top three highest peaks. The province is divided into ten administrative subdivisions of seven rural districts and three towns/councils, including the provincial capital, Mutare. The name Manicaland is derived from one of the province's largest ethnic groups, the Manyika, who originate from the area north of the Manicaland province and as well as western Mozambique, who speak a distinct language called ChiManyika in Shona (one of the dialect of the Shona language).

Manicaland is bordered by Mashonaland East Province to the northwest, Midlands Province to the west, Masvingo Province to the southwest, and Mozambique to the east. It has an area of 36,459 square kilometres (14,077 mi^{2}), equal to 9.28% of the total area of Zimbabwe. It is the sixth-largest in area of Zimbabwe's ten provinces. Its economy is largely centered around industry and agriculture, particularly manufacturing, diamond and gold mining, timber, tea and coffee plantations, and tourism. In recent years, Manicaland's economy has declined as manufacturing firms and mines continue to fold, and the province now lags behind other Zimbabwean provinces economically and developmentally.

Recent developments in the province are noted mainly in Bocha area where several major infrastructural projects are underway. The province is one heavily underdeveloped areas in the country, on top of that, its economy is one the worst mainly due to Zezuru-Korekore supremacy agenda which was pushed by former president Robert Gabriel Mugabe It is noticeable like in this instance despite the fact it hubs largest rural population, second largest population by province and country third largest city, it is among last 5 developed provinces and does not have an international airport which in turn restricts its growth. It is the home of Zimbabwean tourism alongside Matebeleland North but international tourists does not have direct access, they have to come via Harare where there is an international airport. Diamonds were first discovered in country in Chiadzwa area in Bocha but several years down the line, the area have not benefited anything from the discovery. Penalonga is where illegal gold extraction is done, but instead of Manicaland benefiting, the resources are being looted by Scott Sakupwanya's company and several top government officials.

== Etymology ==
The name Manicaland derives from the fact that part of the area has been occupied in history by the Manyika people. The Manyika are a tribal grouping classified as Shona, with their own language variant, the Manyika language.

== Geography ==
The province is bordered by Mashonaland East Province to the north, Midlands Province to the west, Masvingo Province to the south and southwest, and the Republic of Mozambique to the east. The provincial capital, Mutare (pop:184,205), lies approximately 265 kilometres (165 mi), by road, southeast of Harare, the capital of Zimbabwe and the largest city in that country.

The Eastern Highlands run along the eastern edge of Manicaland. The highlands are made up of several mountain ranges and include Mount Nyangani, Zimbabwe's highest peak. Manicaland has a tropical forest climate.

The northern part of Manicaland is drained northwards by tributaries of the Zambezi River, including the Gairezi and the Nyangombe. The central and southern portions of the province are drained southwards by the Save River and its tributaries, including the Odzi River. Some areas along the province's eastern edge, including Honde Valley, Burma Valley, and eastern Chimanimani and Chipinge districts, drain eastwards into the Pungwe and Buzi rivers.

== Districts ==
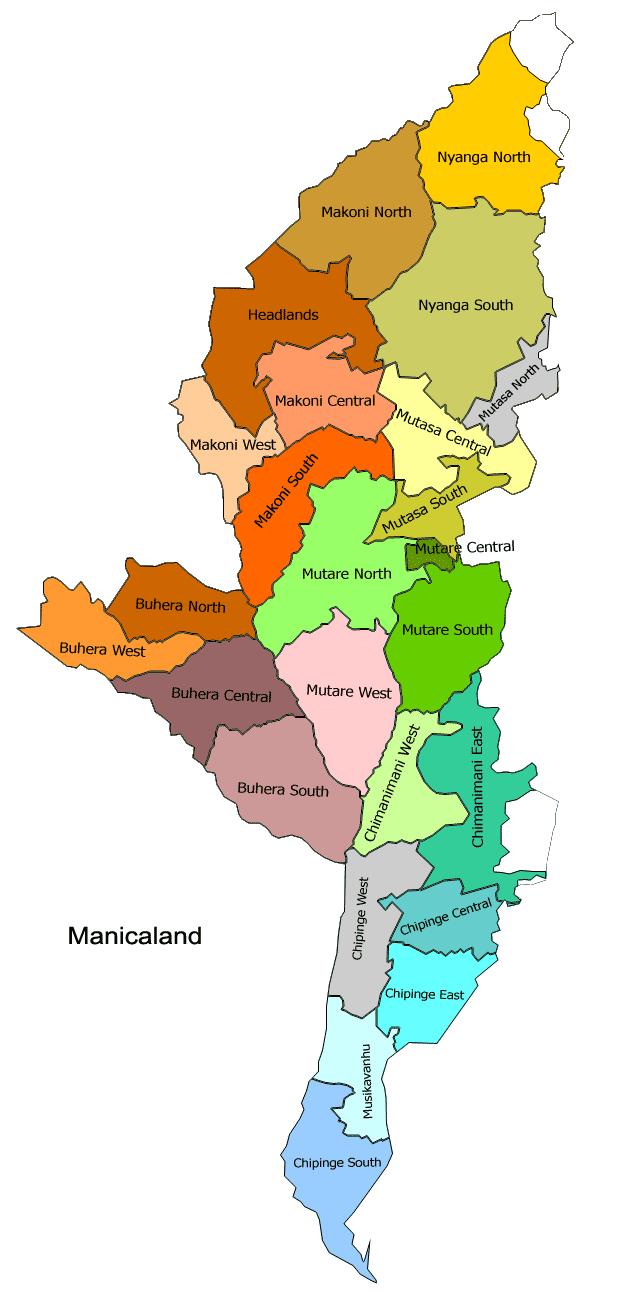
Manicaland Province division for the 2008 elections

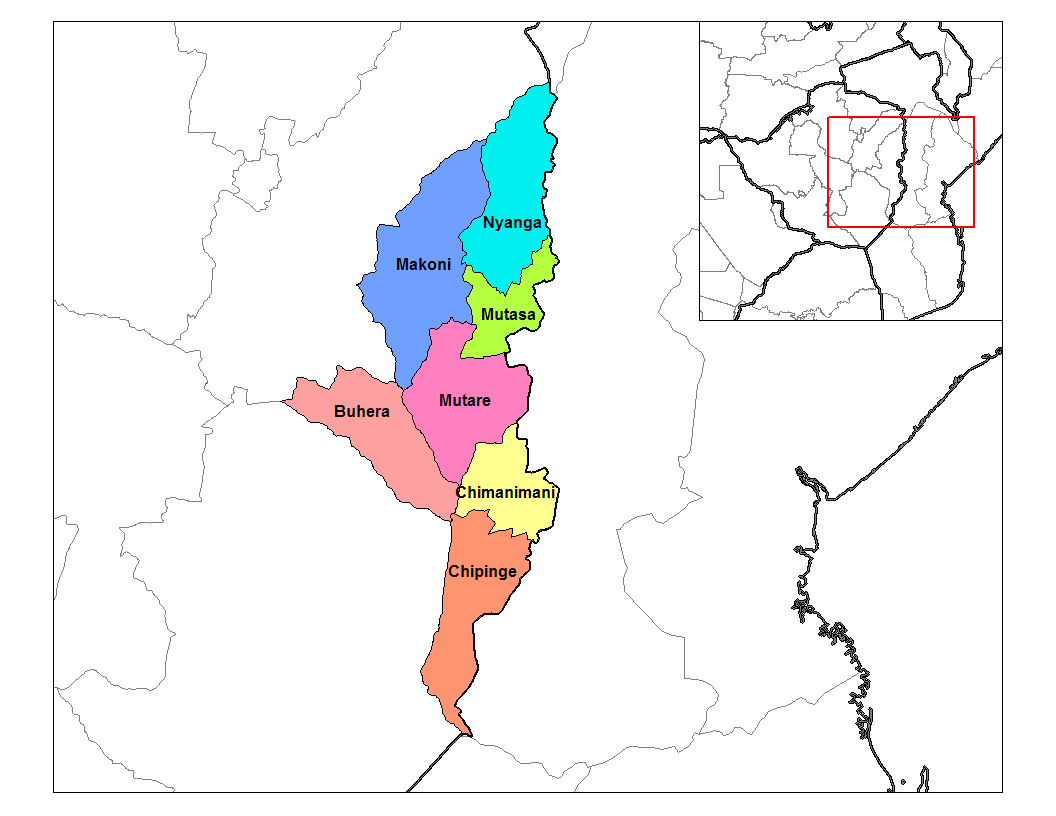
Districts of Manicaland

The province is subdivided into seven rural districts and three town/councils:

- Buhera District
- Chimanimani District
- Chipinge District
- Makoni District
- Mutare District (in the center)
- Mutasa District
- Nyanga District (in the northeast of the province)
- Mutare City Council
- Chipinge Town Council
- Rusape Town Council

== Demographics and diversity ==
Historical population
Year	Pop.	±%
1992	1,537,676	—
2002	1,568,930	+2.0%
2012	1,752,698	+11.7%
2022	2,037,762	+16.3%
Source: Zimbabwe National Statistics Agency (ZIMSTAT)

Manicaland is the second most populated province in Zimbabwe. It has a population of about 1,755,000 which constitutes about 13.5% of the country's total population.

The people of Manicaland speak Shona although the different districts have own languages and dialects. For example, Mutasa District use Manyika as a language. In Makoni District, the MaUngwe people use the chiUngwe. In Chimanimani District, Chipinge District the Ndau people use chiNdau and the Machangana/ Shangaani people use chiChangana/ Shangaan language. In Mutare District the people of Marange use chiBocha and the Jindwi people of Zimunya use chiJindwi.

These languages transcend the modern day boundaries set by the districts, being synonymous with the people in their Chiefdoms, who originally occupied these lands and beyond, prior to the displacement and resettlement caused by colonial occupation and repression in the early part of the 20th century. Boundaries between Kingdoms/ Chiefdoms were redrawn under the Land Apportionment Act of 1930 and the Native Land Husbandry Act of 1951. Colonial authorities used a similar technique to divide up land and authority, which in colonial Rhodesia manifested itself, through a long series of legislative measures (most importantly the Land Apportionment Act of 1930 and the Native Land Husbandry Act of 1951), in the sharp division between Native reserves (later known as the Tribal Trust Lands), and European farming areas, with the Native Purchase Areas forming a kind of middle stage between the two. After the country's independence in 1980, district boundaries were redrawn based on political direction in the newer dispensation.

== Spirituality and religion ==
A great number of the population practise their own traditional way of worshipping, but many also practice Christianity (about 65%). The majority falling under the traditional churches: Methodist Church, Seventh-day Adventist Church, the Anglican Church and the Roman Catholic Church. The Pentecostal churches have large followings in the urban areas of Mutare and a few other growth points. Some gatherings fall under the Apostolic Churches, with a notably higher proportion of the Apostolic followers in Mutare and Buhera district. Polygamy is quite prevalent among church members. Other communities such as Muslim are represented, owing to the influence of migration.

== Schools ==
Manicaland boasts of some of the best performing schools in the country. Schools such as St Augustines (Tsambe), St Faith's School, Rusape (Fisco-'Madetere'), Saint David's Girls' High (Bonda Bullets), Nyanga High School, Marist Brothers, St Marys, Mt Selinda High, Emmanuel High, Kriste Mambo, Mutare Boys' High School, Mutare Girls High (The Shumbas), St Dominics Mutare, Marange High, Hartzell High, Lydia Chimonyo, Sakubva High, Dangamvura High.

The privately run Africa University provides some relief (albeit to a lesser extent), but it simply cannot absorb the huge numbers of school leavers with high grades.

In general, there is a school within a 5 kilometres (3.1 mi) radius across Manicaland. There are numerous primary and secondary schools scattered across the province. The distribution of schools by district is shown in the table below.

District	Primary	Secondary
Buhera	140	55
Chimanimani	68	24
Chipinge	125	40
Makoni	170	60
Mutare	172	67
Mutasa	72	27
Nyanga	75	25
Total	822	298

== See also ==
- Provinces of Zimbabwe
- Districts of Zimbabwe
- Massi Kessi
- Sadomba Women Cattle Project
