= Honde River =

River in Zimbabwe

Coordinates: 18.48470°S 32.85234°E

The Pungwe River basin with the Honde (center left)

Honde River pronounced Horn-de is a river in Eastern Highlands of Zimbabwe which runs through the Honde Valley. It flows from Mount Inyangani on the western edges of Honde Valley where it is joined by several of its major tributaries: the rivers Mupenga, Buu, Mtarazi and Ngarura. It deposits its waters into the Pungwe River, already in Mozambique, which in turn empties in the Indian Ocean.

Mtarazi Falls, Zimbabwe's highest at 762 metres (2,500 ft) flows into the Honde south of Pungwe Gorge at the Honde River valley just outside Nyanga National Park. Parts of the Honde in the southern Nyanga support lush vegetation, the closest Zimbabwe has to Jungle. Further south, the Honde provides water for communal irrigation in an otherwise dry area. The 500 square kilometres (190 sq mi) of the Honde Valley in Zimbabwe are extensively cultivated, often with gravity fed irrigation channels. Extensive use is made of the many smaller tributaries feeding into the river in this portion of the Honde Valley.

The Honde River forms part of the Mozambique-Zimbabwe border before flowing into Pungwe river which finally empties into the Indian Ocean at Beira.
