= Nyanga National Park =

National park in Zimbabwe

- IUCN category II (national park)
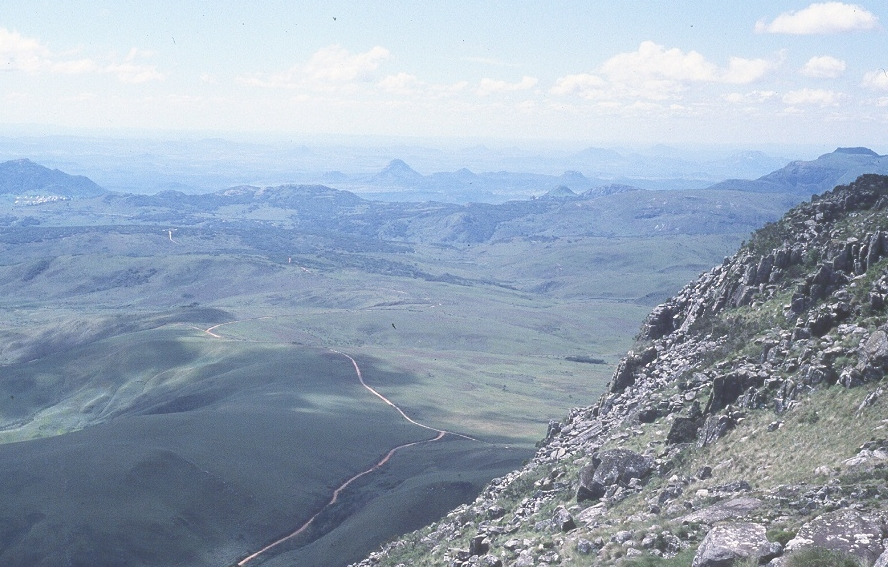
- View across central Nyanga National Park from Mount Nyangani. The Pungwe River rises in the moorland on the left. The prominent hill at Ziwa can be seen in the distance and the Troutbeck Plateau on the far right.
- Interactive map of Nyanga National Park
- Location: Nyanga District, Zimbabwe
- Nearest city: Mutare
- Coordinates: 18°17′13″S 32°43′30″E
- Area: 472 km^{2} (182 sq mi)
- Established: 1926
- Governing body: Zimbabwe Parks and Wildlife Management Authority

Nyanga National Park lies in the north of Zimbabwe's Eastern Highlands. One of the first national parks to be declared in the country, it contains the highest land in Zimbabwe, with green hills and perennial rivers. Most of its terrain consists of rolling downland, sometimes lightly wooded, lying at altitudes between 1,800–2,593 metres (6,560–7,544 feet). Mount Nyangani, the highest point in Zimbabwe, lies in the centre of the park and Mutarazi Falls, Zimbabwe's highest waterfall, is in the south of the park. Nyanga National Park incorporates the former Mutarazi Falls National Park on its southern boundary.

== History of the park ==
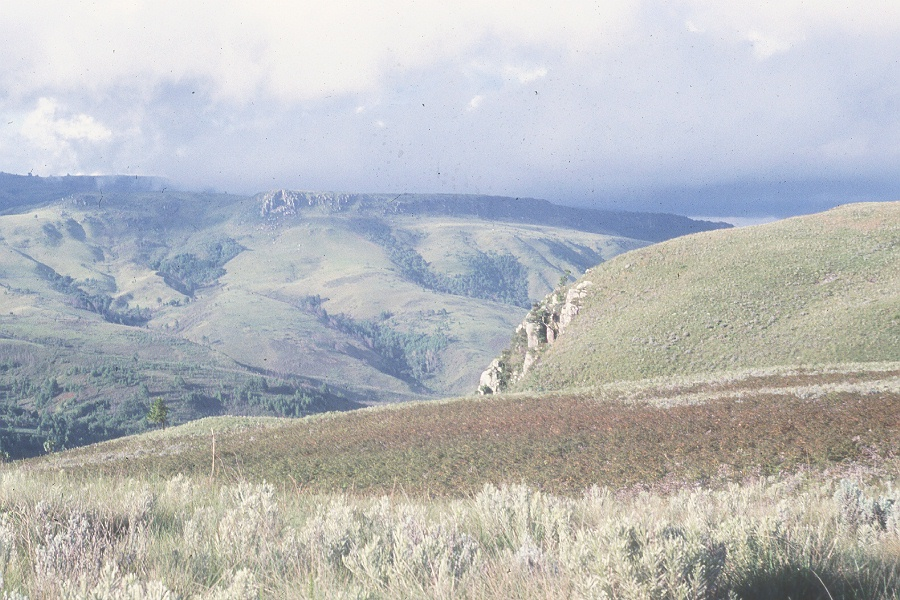
Stormclouds over the Kwaraguza area, acquired by Nyanga National Park in the late 1990s.

The national park is one of the oldest in Zimbabwe, established as Rhodes Inyanga National Park, a bequest from Cecil Rhodes. The original park borders extended beyond Udu Dam, along the east bank of the Nyangombe River to the north of the current park boundary. This extension was sold in the 1970s, but the Warrendale section, immediately beyond Udu Dam, had been recovered by the early 1980s.

The park nearly doubled in size with the late 1990s purchase of most of the Inyanga Block and Kwaraguza farms. These purchases expanded the national park to the north and east of Mount Nyangani, incorporating some important areas of montane rainforest, the source area of the Kairezi River and Nyama Falls. The incorporation of Nyazengu farm in 2014, previously an enclave within the park, completed the formal protection of Mount Nyangani and the headwaters of the Pungwe River, although Nyazengu had been operated as a private nature reserve until 2000 and as unincorporated council land after the designation and acquisition of Nyazengu farm in 2000.

The current name Nyanga reflects the correct vernacular pronunciation of the area.

== Features ==
=== Flora ===
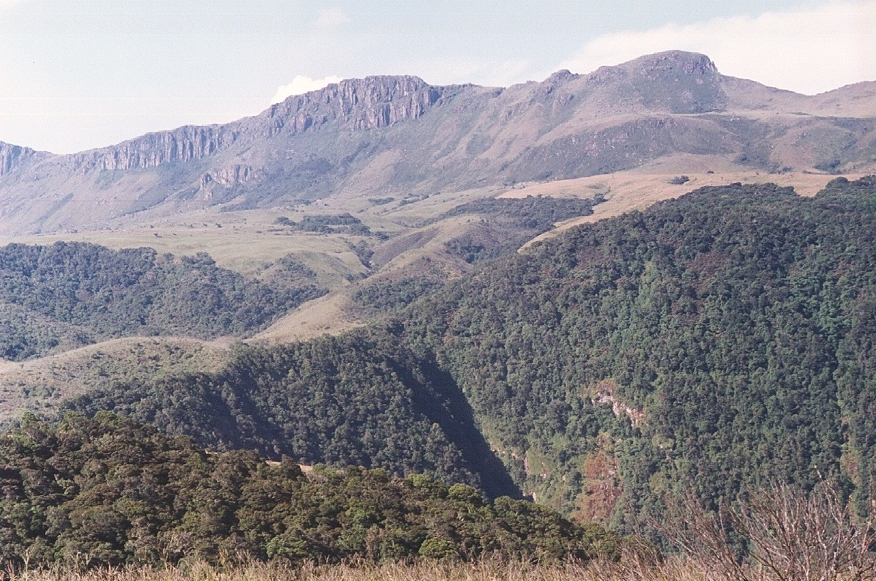
Nyanga landscape: Afromontane forest and moorland.

The vegetation of Nyanga is part of the Eastern Zimbabwe montane forest-grassland mosaic, within the montane grasslands and shrublands ecoregion. The rainforest is found mainly on the eastern (leeward) slopes, as well as in the steeper valleys on west-facing slopes. It is dominated by Syzygium

Woodlands of dwarf msasa have developed on some westward-facing slopes. Copses of Mulanje cypress survive in areas that are safe from fire.

Treeferns are a very noticeable part of the Nyanga flora, with the common tree fern occurring on the moorlands and the forest tree fern in the rainforests. The Nyanga aloe, Aloe inyangensis, is found on higher ground.

Black wattle, introduced into plantations outside the park spread rapidly into several parts of the park. Pine, planted between Rhodes and Mare Dams, also spread. By 1988 it was estimated that around 40% of the park had been invaded by these alien species. The park authorities maintain a continuous eradication programme.

=== Fauna ===
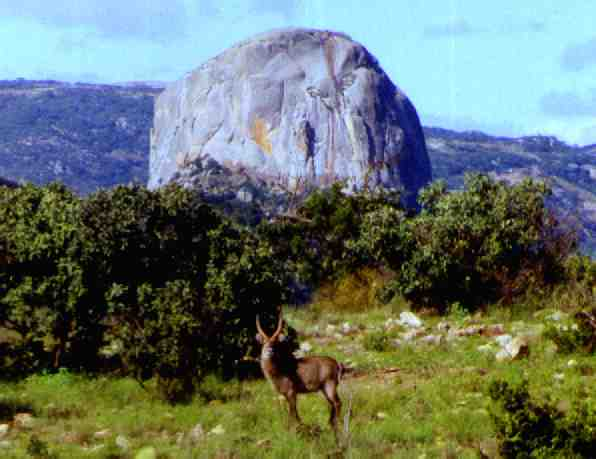
Male waterbuck in the Udu area.

A wildlife checklist compiled over several years reveals a remarkable diversity of mammals, including occasional sightings of buffalo and lion that stray into the region from the Mozambique lowlands. Visitors are likely to see kudu, reedbuck, klipspringer and several other antelope; predators, including leopard and hyaena, are also present. The African clawless otter is common in the upper Kairezi River, in the northeast of the park.

The park is best known among wildlife conservationists for its populations of blue duiker and Samango monkeys. Neither animal is found outside the Eastern Highlands. The Inyangani river frog is an endangered amphibian found in rocky, fast-flowing streams in the montane grassland.

Lake Gulliver and the Mare, Udu, Purdon and Rhodes Dams have been stocked with trout from hatcheries maintained by the Department of National Parks. The rainbow trout is most widespread within the park's dams and streams but brown trout and American brook trout are also present.

=== Geography and geology ===
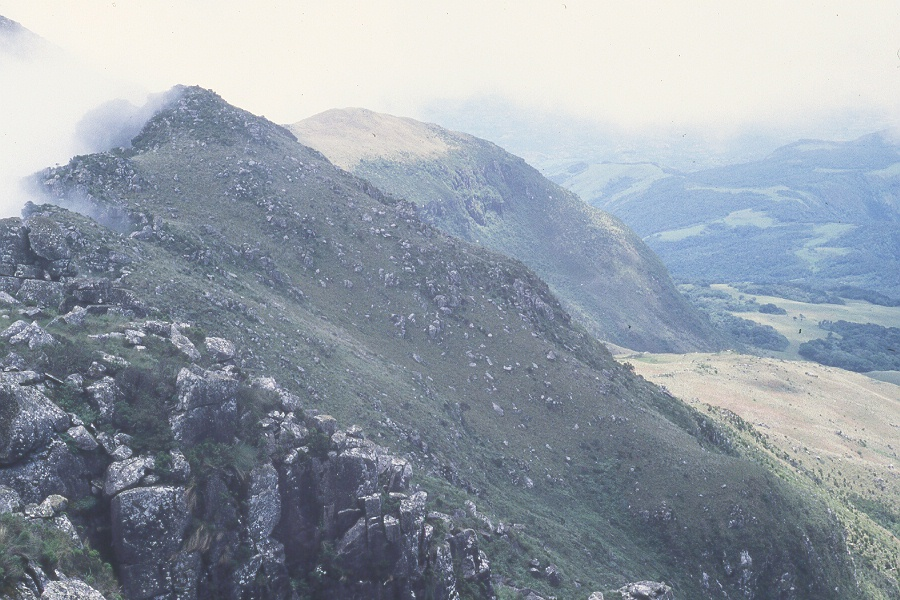
Dolerites of the Nyangani sill, overlying Archaean granite.

The park is dominated by Mount Nyangani which lies in the centre and is the highest mountain in Zimbabwe.

The park is well watered by numerous streams and rivers. The central and eastern parts of the park form part of the Zambezi Basin. The Nyangombe River, whose tributaries include the Mare River and the Nyamuziwa River, and the Kairezi River both flow north out of the park, ultimately to join the Mazowe River. The Pungwe River rises at the foot of Nyangani and flows southwards through the park before dropping 240 metres (787 ft) into the densely wooded Pungwe Gorge. The Mutarazi Falls, a few kilometres south of the Pungwe Gorge, have a 762 metres (2,499 ft) drop and are Zimbabwe's highest waterfall; they drop in two stages over granite cliffs into the Honde River valley, which lies outside the park and is a major tea-planting area.

Five dams have been constructed for recreation and tourist water supply: Rhodes Dam and Mare Dam on the Mare River, Lake Gulliver and Purdon Dams on tributaries of the Mare River and Udu Dam on a tributary of the Nyangombe River.

Most of Nyanga National Park is underlain by granite. The highest mountains are composed of Umkondo Group dolerite and sandstone, with the harder dolerite forming cliffs and ridges and the granite-dolerite contact often forming waterfalls. The Troutbeck dolerite sill, shown in the distance in the photograph of Kwaraguza above, was dated at 1099 Ma.

=== Archaeological, historical cultural sites ===
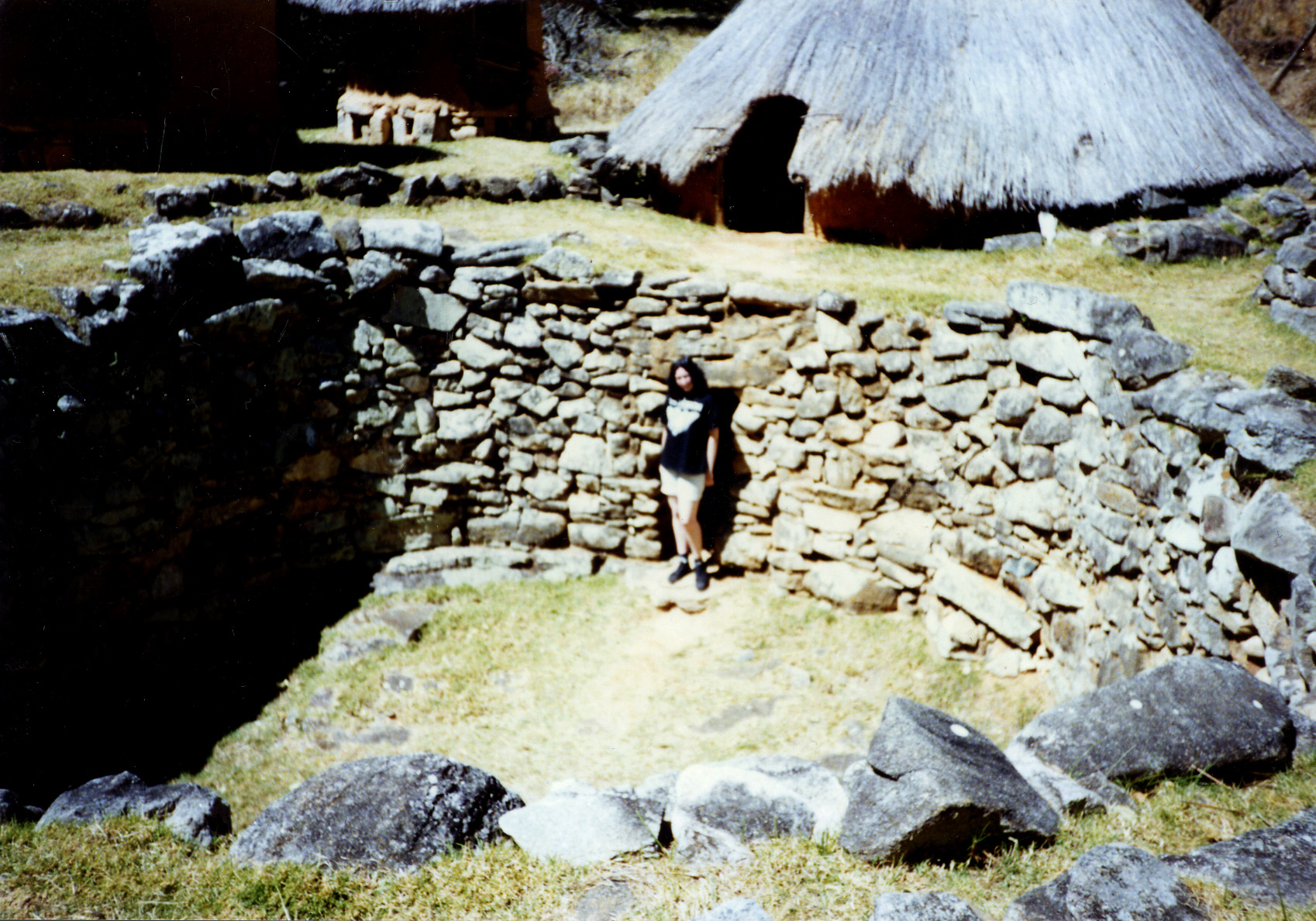
Reconstructed pit structure near Rhodes Dam, Nyanga National Park, probably used as a cattle pen.

Fifteenth to seventeenth century ruins of the Ziwa people (upland culture) have been found throughout Nyanga. The ruins include homesteads, centred on pit structures thought to have been used as cattle-pens and larger hill-top settlements, referred to as Forts. The pit structures were once referred to as slave pits, but that interpretation has generally been not supported by archaeologists and is now discredited. There are three sites which can be readily accessed by tourists: Chawomera Fort is located above the Nyangombe River, on a gravel road north of the park headquarters. In addition to the fort, there are several pit structures. Nyangwe Fort, near Mare Dam, is the most extensive and best-preserved ruin in the park. It is a top a small hill with good views over the Mare valley. Near the park headquarters is a reconstructed pit structure - the homestead around a pit structure has been rebuilt and a site museum established. Several other sites have spectacular locations, such as the fort which overlooks the confluence of the Nyangombe and Nyaumziwa rivers and a small fort on top of a hill just west of Mount Nyangani. However these two sites are not easily accessible.

Associated with the ruins are extensive agricultural terracing and irrigation furrows. Iron extraction was practised, mainly to support the complex agricultural technology.

The core areas of the park were once the private estate of Cecil Rhodes. He acquired it with the aim of growing apples and raising sheep, and spent the last years of his life at his homestead near Rhodes Dam. This homestead is now the Rhodes Museum and Rhodes Nyanga Hotel.

== Accommodation and camping ==
=== Rest camps ===
There are three large rest camps in Nyanga National Park, all of which consist of fully equipped, self-catering lodges. Rhodes Dam, which is also the park headquarters, is located near the main entrance in a pine forest. Mare Dam is some eight kilometers east of Rhodes, in the center of the park and close to three trout fishing dams and Nyangwe Fort. Udu Dam is in the north-west of the park, on the road to Nyangombe Falls.

There are also two lodges at the Pungwe Drift (currently leased to a private operator), one located on each side of the Pungwe River, upstream of the Pungwe Falls. There used to be an isolated chalet at Nyamuziwa Falls, but this was closed in the 1970s.

=== Camping sites ===
There is also a camping ground and caravan park on the Mare River half a kilometer west of Rhodes Dam, and a second camping ground at Mutarazi Falls. The larger Nyangombe camping ground, on the main highway from Mutare to Nyanga town was closed in the late 1990s.

=== Privately owned camps and sites ===
There are two private facilities within the park: Rhodes Hotel, on the south bank of Rhodes Dam, incorporating Cecil Rhodes' old homestead, and the Mountain Club of Zimbabwe hut, on the Kwaraguza road from Mount Nyangani to Troutbeck.

== Places of interest ==
=== Central and western area ===
This is the most developed part of the park, stretching from the park headquarters at Rhodes Dam to Mount Nyangani. The area includes the three rest camps and the five dams. Places of interest which are accessible on dust roads maintained by the park are Nyangombe Falls, Nyamuziwa Falls, Mount Nyangani and the two largest archaeological sites: Nyangwe Fort and Chawomera Fort. This area also includes the main recreational facilities, such as the five dams stocked for fly-fishing and the pony trails office.

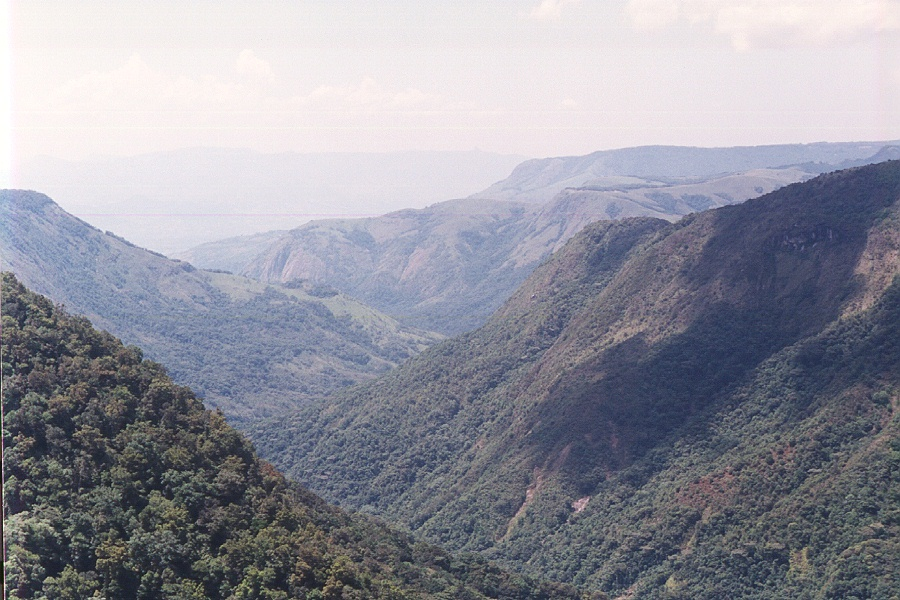
The Pungwe and Nyazengu gorges in the south of the park.

=== Southern area ===
Administered from the Pungwe Drift substation, this region is less developed, with roads only along the edges. Access from the park headquarters is via the "Scenic road", a gravel road that runs parallel to the Nyanga to Mutare highway. The Pungwe Drift substation and lodges are at the end of a steep dust road, off the Secenic Road. The Pungwe View, from which the Pungwe Falls and Pungwe Gorge can be seen, is on the edge of the Scenic Road. Further south is Mutarazi Falls - the highest waterfall in Zimbabwe, which can also be accessed by most vehicles.

Access to the Thomberutedza Falls requires four wheel drive and the dense Pungwe gorge rainforest can only be accessed on foot. There is a four-wheel drive track that links the Pungwe Drift to Mount Nyangani, through the Nyazengu area.

=== Eastern area ===
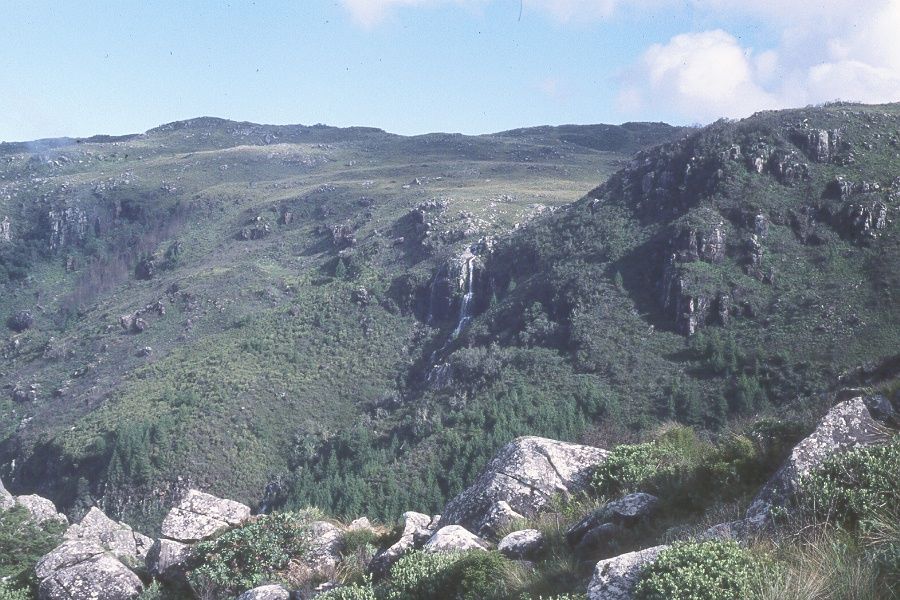
The rarely visited Nyama Falls on the north-eastern side of Mount Nyangani.

The land east of Mount Nyangani was added to the park in the late 1990s and is administered from the Donjera (Gleneagles) Substation on the former Inyanga Block Estate. The area comprises the eastern slopes of Mount Nyangani, Little Nyangani and Mataka Mountains and the Kayirezi and Nyama valleys. Much of the lower-lying ground is forested with pine and blue gum.

Access by road is from Mount Nyangani along the Gleneagles road or from Troutbeck via Nyafaru. This requires special permission from park headquarters, as the roads are gated.

== Tourism ==
=== Access ===
There are tarred roads from Mutare and Rusape to Nyanga village. The main road to Nyanga town passes through the park shortly after Juliasdale.

=== Game viewing ===
Although there are no game viewing hides and Nyanga is not primarily a game park, there is a variety of wildlife to be seen, especially in the central and western parts of the park.

=== Hiking ===
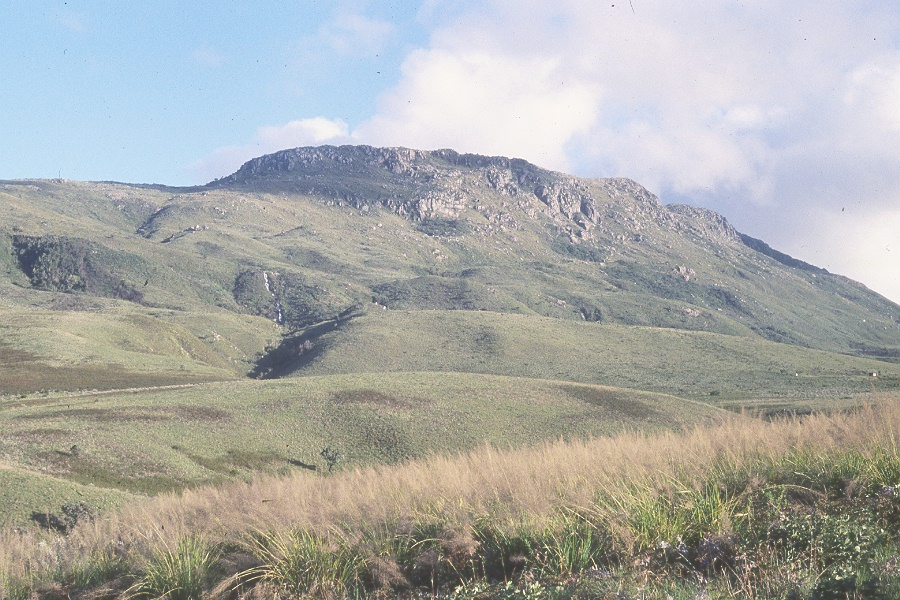
Mount Nyangani from the west. The main hiking route, the "Tourist Path", goes from the building on the far right and ascends to the left of the summit plateau on the skyline.

There are numerous hiking paths leading to most of the waterfalls and many of the ruins, and along the rivers and mountains in the park.

The main route up Mount Nyangani is a hike, and has views across the park, much of Nyanga District and further into Mozambique.

=== Horse riding ===
Short horse-riding trails are available around Nyangwe Fort, the Experimental Fruit Station and Mare Dam, as well as longer trails into Warrendale, beyond Udu Dam. The trails start and end at the Pony Trails office, on the gravel road from the park headquarters to Mare Dam.

=== Fly fishing ===
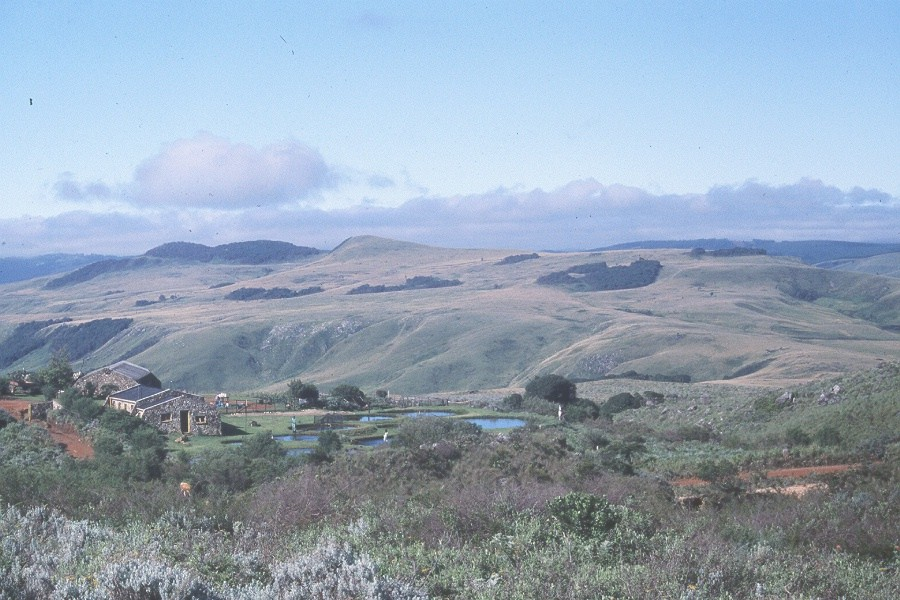
Nyazengu Trout Hatchery. The dams and rivers of Nyanga National Park are stocked with trout.

The five dams and the Kayirezi, Mare, Nyamuziwa, Nyangombe and Pungwe Rivers are stocked with rainbow trout. Brown trout and brook trout are to be found in Lake Gulliver and Purdon Dam only. The park entrance fee includes a fishing license, valid for all waters open to fishing, except for Lake Gulliver and Purdon Dam, for which a separate license is available. Fishing is restricted to certain times of year.

=== Swimming ===
River in the park are free of bilharzia, unlike the rest of Zimbabwe. There is a natural swimming pool on the Nyangombe River, near the park headquarters, and a swimming weir on the Udu River below Udu Dam.

Mutarazi Falls

Mutarazi Falls is the highest waterfall in Zimbabwe and the second highest on the Continent. Visitors may leave their vehicles at the car park and take a short hike to the edge of the escarpment for views of the waterfalls and the Honde Valley, approximately 800 metres below.

=== Boating ===
The park's five dams are all suitable for boating and boats are available for hire at Rhodes, Mare and Udu Dams.

== See also ==
- Mutarazi Falls
- Nyanga village
- Mount Nyangani

== Gallery ==
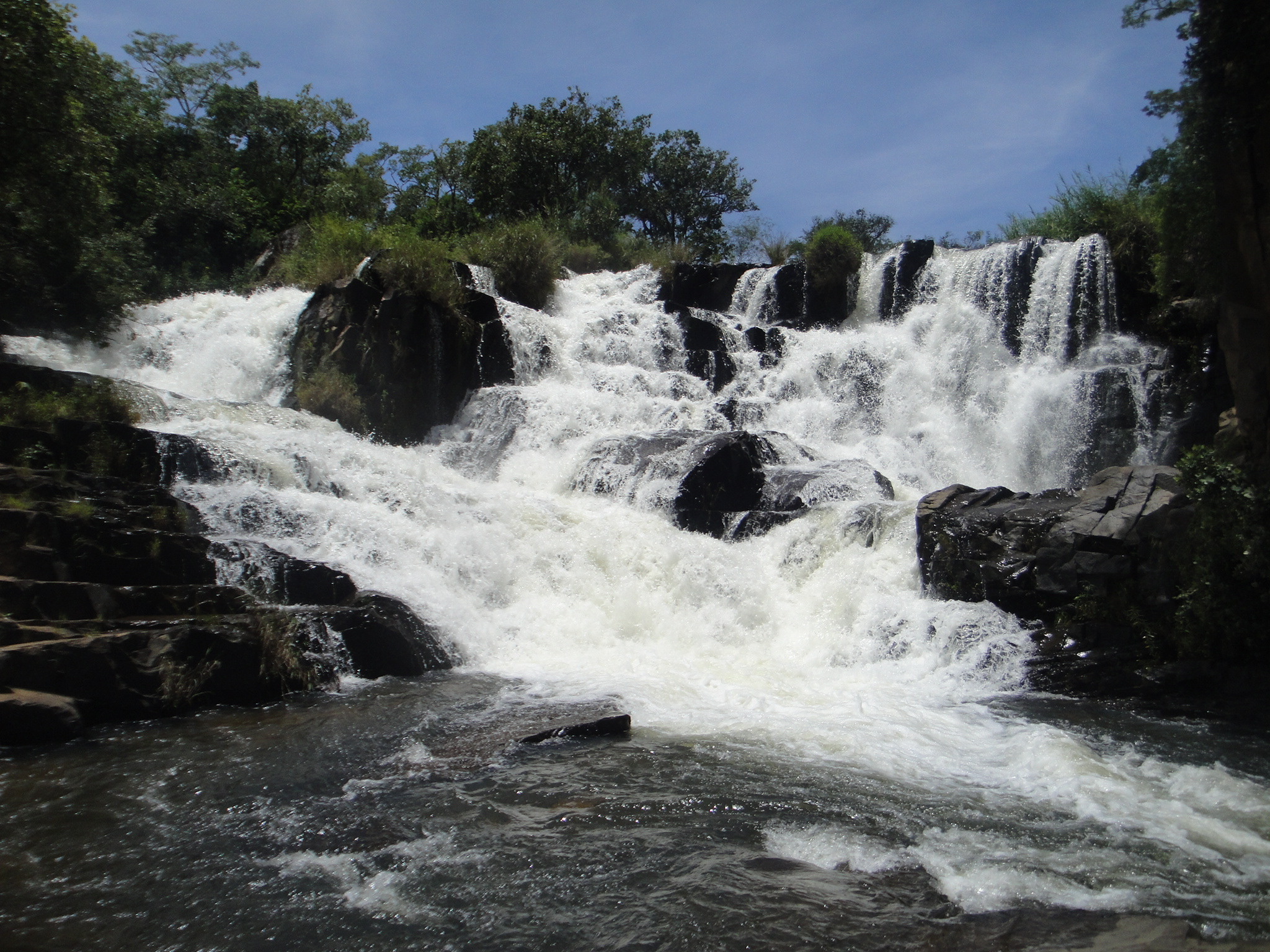
Nyangombe Falls

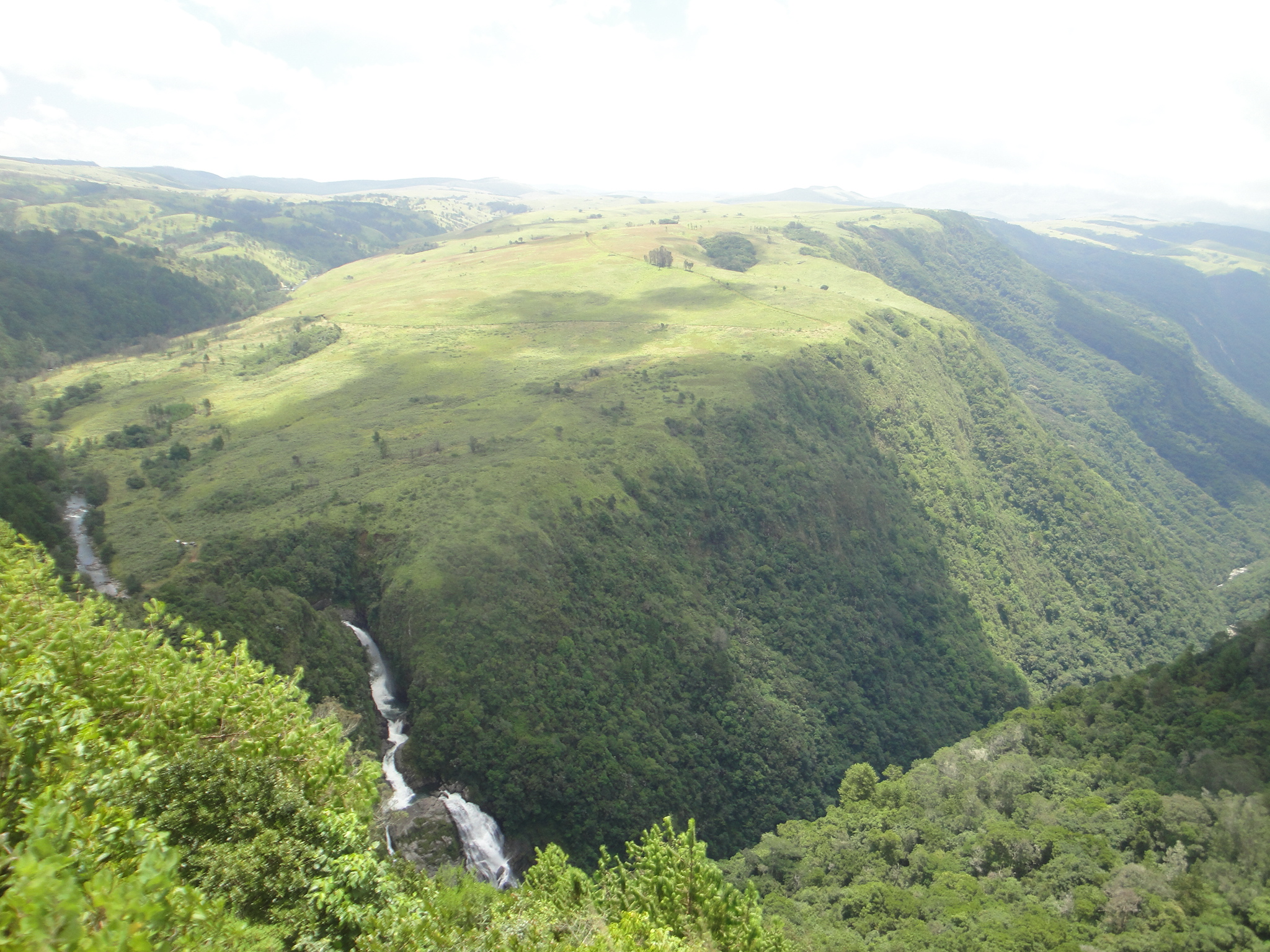
Pungwe Falls

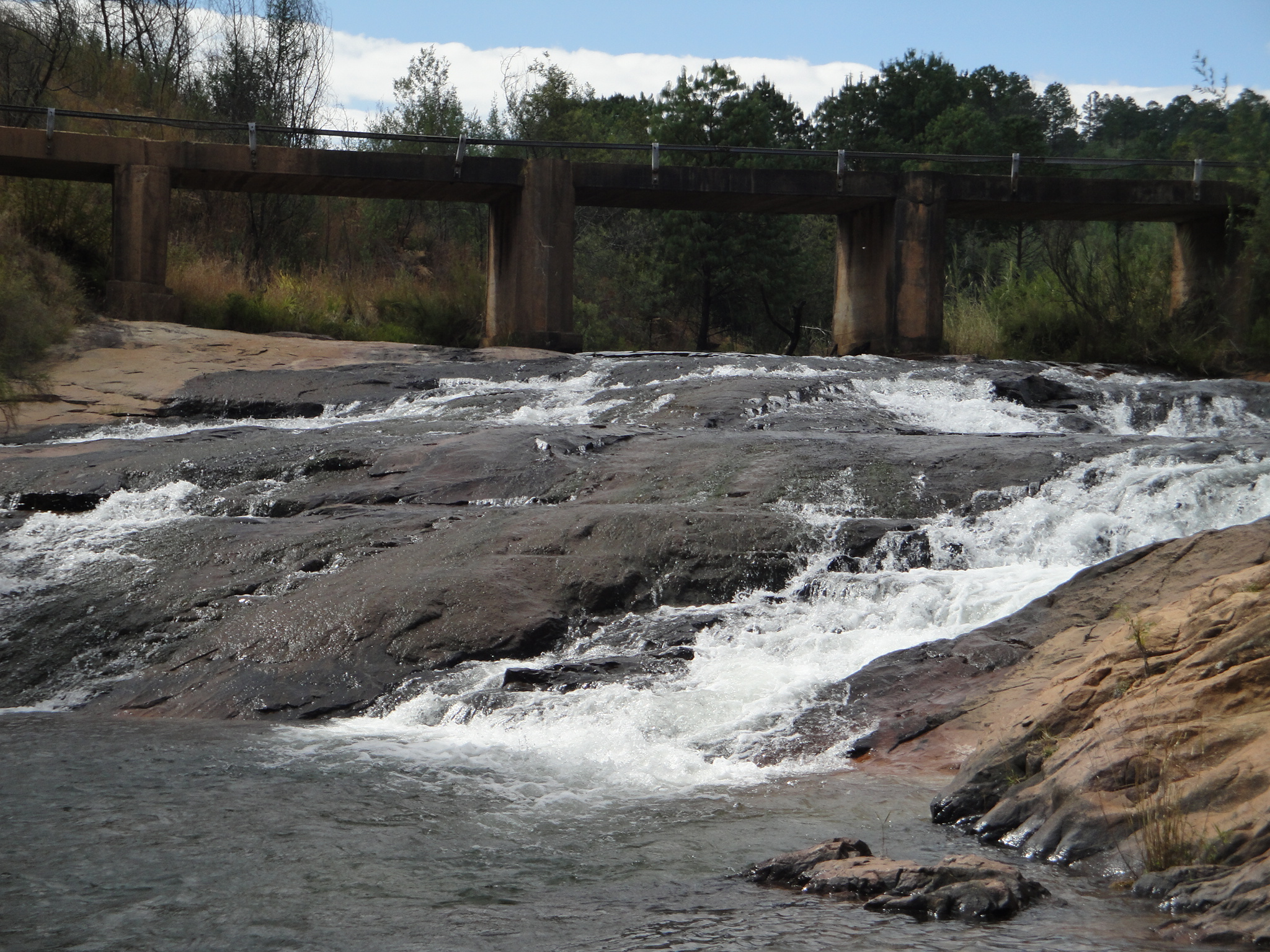
Rapid on the Nyangombe River, above the natural swimming pool
