= Pungwe River =

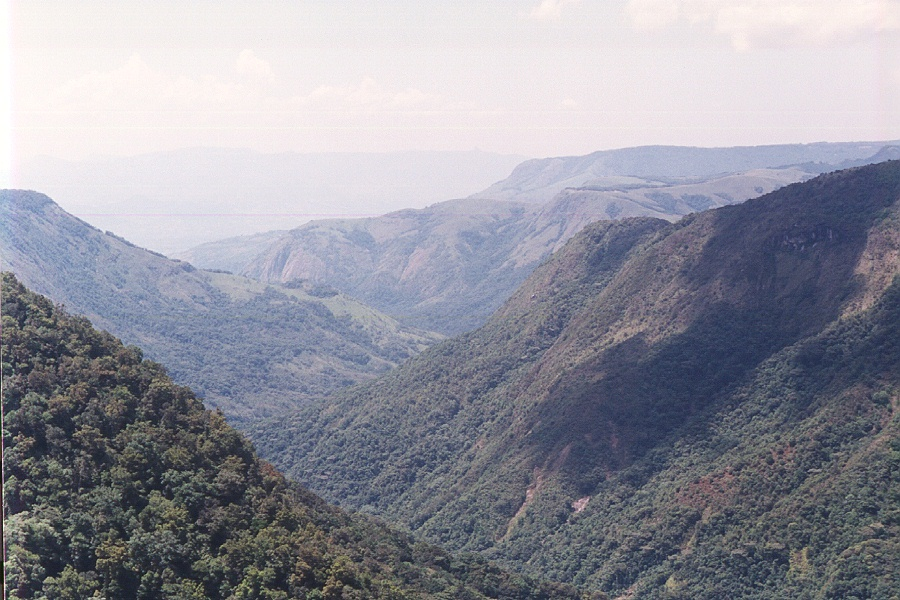
- Pungwe gorge in Nyanga National Park, Zimbabwe

- Map of the Pungwe River basin
- Native name: Rio Púngoè or Rio Púnguè (Portuguese)

Location
- Country: Zimbabwe and Mozambique

Physical characteristics
- Source
  - location: Mount Nyangani (Zimbabwe)
  - elevation: 1,500 m (4,900 ft)
- Mouth
  - location: Beira, Indian Ocean
  - coordinates: 19.865278°S 34.818611°E
  - elevation: 0 m (0 ft)
- Length: 400 km (250 mi)
- Basin size: 31,151 km^{2} (12,027 mi^{2}) to 32,243.7 km^{2} (12,449.4 mi^{2})
- Discharge
  - average: (Period: 1979–2015) 20.44 km^{3}/a (648 m^{3}/s) (Period: 1971–2000) 615.9 m^{3}/s (21,750 cu ft/s) 120 m^{3}/s (4,200 cu ft/s) to 133 m^{3}/s (4,700 cu ft/s)

Basin features
- River system: Pungwe River
- Tributaries
  - left: Vunduzi, Urema
  - right: Honde
- Waterfalls: Pungwe Falls

Pungwe River (Portuguese: Rio Púngoè or Rio Púnguè) is a 400 km (250 mi) long river in Zimbabwe and Mozambique. It rises below Mount Nyangani in the Eastern Highlands of Zimbabwe and then flows southeastwards through the Manica and Sofala provinces of Mozambique. The Pungwe enters the Urema Valley, the southernmost portion of the Great Rift Valley, where it forms the southern boundary of Gorongosa National Park. The Urema River joins it, and the river follows the rift valley southward. Large seasonal wetlands form around the Pungwe and Urema rivers in the rift valley section. It empties into the Mozambique Channel at Beira, forming a large estuary. It is one of the major rivers of Mozambique and often causes floods.

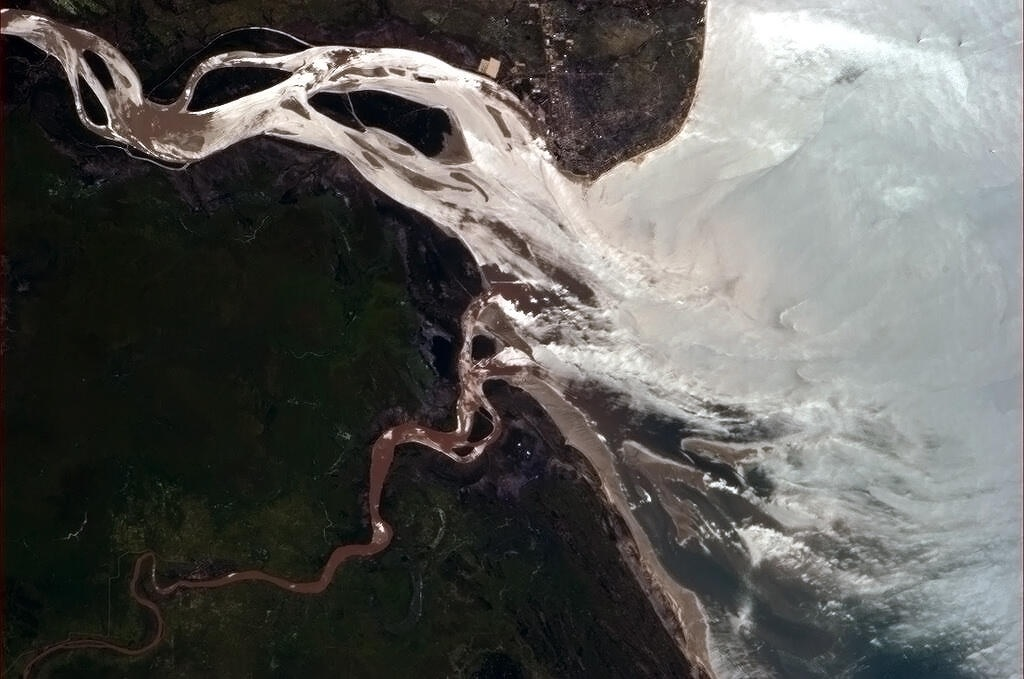
Beira at the mouth of the Pungwe River, as seen from the International Space Station

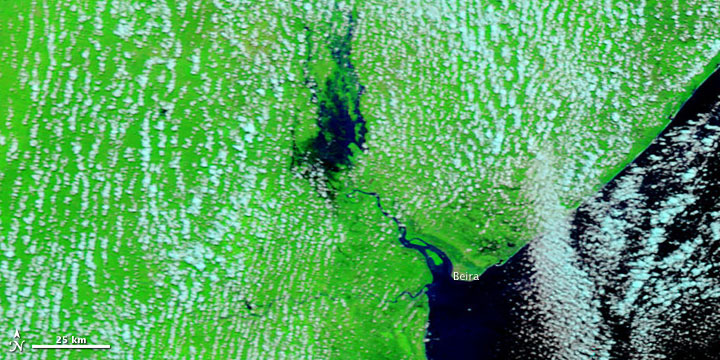
The Pungwe River flooding as seen from NASA MODIS satellite in 2010.

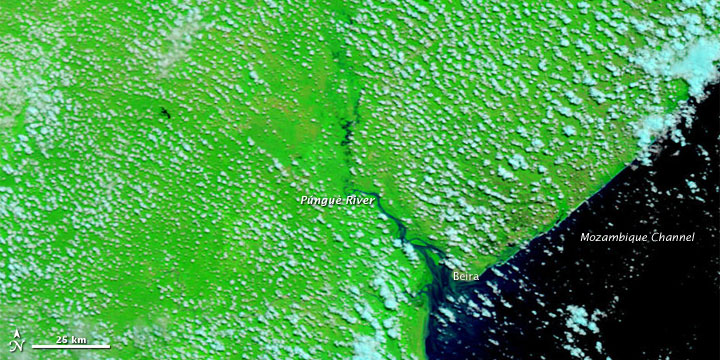
The Pungwe River in a normal state as seen from NASA MODIS satellite in 2009.

== Tributaries ==
The principal left tributaries are, from upstream to downstream, the Nhazonia, Txatola, Vinduzi, and Nhandugue-Urema. The right tributaries are the Honde and the Muda.

== Pungwe basin ==
Administratively, the Pungwe Basin covers parts of Sofala and Manica provinces in Mozambique, and a large part of Mutasa District in Zimbabwe. A small portion of the basin in Zimbabwe falls in Nyanga District. As of 2003, the basin's population in Mozambique is estimated at 1,104,000 people and that for Zimbabwe at 96,000 people.

== Water supply systems ==
Beira metropolitan area in Mozambique receives its water supply from the Pungwe River. The 2004 water demand from the Beira/Dondo water supply, which included the Mutua and Mafambisse areas, was estimated at 25,339 cubic metres (894,800 cu ft)/day.

The city of Mutare is supplied from the Pungwe River through an inter-catchment transfer facility. The quantities transferred to are limited to a maximum of 0.7 cubic metres per second (25 cu ft/s) by the provisions of a water permit and system design. In addition, on 27 September 1995, it was agreed at a meeting of the Mozambican and Zimbabwean ministers responsible for water affairs that water could be abstracted from the Pungwe River to supply the city of Mutare, with an upper limit of 1 cubic metre per second (35 cu ft/s). Consequently, a fixed abstraction of 60,480 m^{3}/d (2,136 thousand ft^{3}/d) by Mutare city has been adopted as water demand from the Pungwe River. The Mutasa Rural District is also expected to draw water from the Pungwe pipeline to supply villages along its route.

Climate change is predicted to lead to about 10% reduction in annual rainfall. This implies decreased river flow and available water for the Pungwe River basin, with possibly severe consequences for agricultural production. While the between-year variability in flow is not predicted to change significantly, within-year variability is expected to increase. This will worsen both floods and droughts.

== Discharge ==
Discharge of the Pungwe River at Jangada (19°26′56.7276″S 34°32′16.2204″E). Period from 1998/01/01 to 2023/12/31 (Source: The Flood Observatory):

Year	Average discharge (m^{3}/s)			Year	Average discharge (m^{3}/s)		
Year	Mean	Min	Max	Year	Mean	Min	Max
1998	512	165	1,152	2011	496	219	861
1999	817	377	1,570	2012	196	28	553
2000	491	155	1,125	2013	471	108	1,068
2001	1,351	786	2,388	2014	565	199	991
2002	166	13	531	2015	263	53	683
2003	131	8	362	2016	329	86	730
2004	378	116	839	2017	798	304	1,772
2005	232	20	651	2018	800	298	1,453
2006	572	277	1,000	2019	1,010	297	2,237
2007	458	106	966	2020	647	165	1,315
2008	609	285	1,158	2021	884	381	1,863
2009	784	449	1,213	2022	524	164	1,224
2010	658	264	1,325	2023	718	237	1,463
