= Inyangani river frog =

Conservation status
- Endangered (IUCN 3.1)

Scientific classification
- Kingdom: Animalia
- Phylum: Chordata
- Class: Amphibia
- Order: Anura
- Family: Pyxicephalidae
- Genus: Amietia
- Species: A. inyangae

Binomial name
- Amietia inyangae (Poynton, 1966)

Synonyms
- Afrana inyangae (Poynton, 1966)

Species of amphibian

The Inyangani river frog (Amietia inyangae) is a species of frog in the family Pyxicephalidae. It is found in Zimbabwe and possibly Mozambique. Its natural habitats are subtropical or tropical high-altitude grassland and rivers. It is threatened by habitat loss.

== Sources ==
- C.Michael Hogan. 2012. Amietia inyangae. African Amphibians Lifedesk. ed. Breda Zimkus
