= Mutarazi Falls =

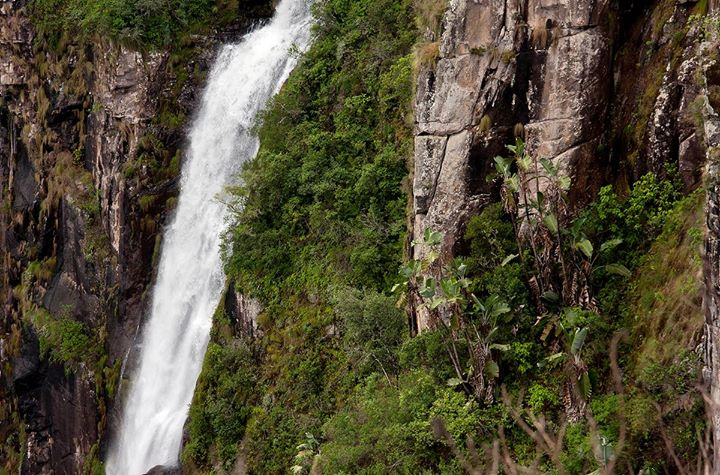
- Mutarazi Fall

- Location within Zimbabwe
- Location: Mutasa District, Manicaland Province, Zimbabwe
- Coordinates: 18.4840265°S 32.7912151°E
- Total height: 772 m (2,533 ft)
- World height ranking: 17th

Mutarazi Falls is a waterfall in Mutasa District in Manicaland Province, Zimbabwe. It is located in the 2,495 hectare Mutarazi National Park adjacent to the southern border of the Nyanga National Park.

== Description ==
The water falls into Honde Valley in two tiers, at a point where the Mtarazi river flows over the edge of the eastern escarpment of Zimbabwe's highlands.

== See also ==
- List of waterfalls
- List of waterfalls by height
