= Gairezi River =

River in Zimbabwe

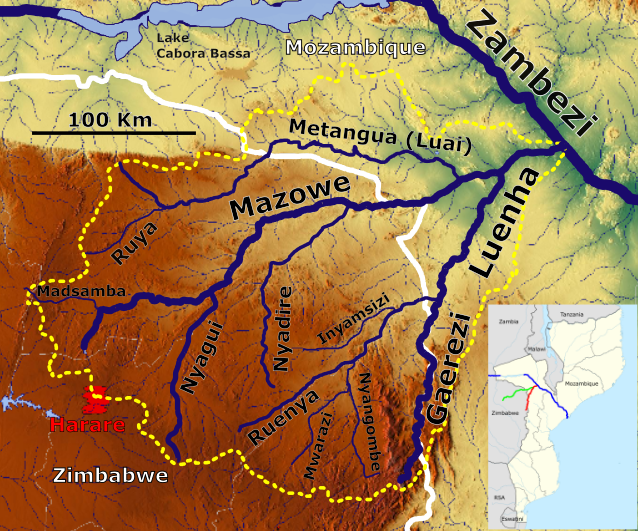
Gairezi River in the Luenha River catchment (bottom right)

The Gairezi River begins on the slopes of Zimbabwe's highest mountain, the 2,592-metre (8,504 ft) Mount Nyangani, and is located in eastern Zimbabwe. As it winds its way north from the Eastern Highlands, and for more than 60 kilometres (37 mi), it subsequently forms the border between Zimbabwe and Mozambique before joining the Mazowe and Zambezi Rivers—as well as the Luenha River, a tributary of the Zambezi—at approximately 160 kilometres (99 mi) upstream.

The Gaizeri runs through Nyanga, a town in Zimbabwe's Manicaland Province.
