= Nyanga District =

Coordinates: 18°13′S 32°45′E

Nyanga District within Zimbabwe

Nyanga District is located in Manicaland Province of Zimbabwe.

The administrative center is Nyanga village. The 2022 National Zimbabwe census reported its population at 146,227, with 51.9% female and 48.1% male population.

== Geography ==
Nyanga District is bounded on the south by Mutasa District, on the west by Makoni District, on the northwest by Mashonaland East Province, and on the east by Mozambique.

The Nyanga Mountains occupy the southern portion of the district, extending into Mutasa District. Nyanga National Park covers the central part of the range, including Mount Nyangani, Zimbabwe's highest peak.

The Gairezi River forms the eastern boundary of the District with Mozambique. The Nyangombe River forms the district's western and northwestern boundary. Both rivers flow generally northwards, and meet at the district's northernmost point to form the Luenha River, a tributary of the Zambezi.

The Nyangui highlands lie in the center of the district. Nyangui State Forest was established in 1958 as a plantation forest, and covers an area of 155.02 km². In addition to tree plantations, it protects dry montane forests where mountain cypress (Widdringtonia nodiflora) is prominent.

== Administration ==
The District is divided into 31 administrative wards.

The district has two Assembly parliamentary constituencies, Nyanga North and Nyanga South.

== History ==
The ruins of Ziwa, also called the Nyanga cultural landscape, include numerous stone terraces, pit structures, hill fortresses, and iron-smelting sites, along with older stone-age rock art sites.

== Schools ==
1. Samatinha Primary School 2. Tsvito Primary School 3. Nyangani High School 4. Nyanga High School 5. Manjoro Primary School 6. Mapako High School 5. Nyatate High School
