= Nyanga, Zimbabwe =

Nyanga Inyanga
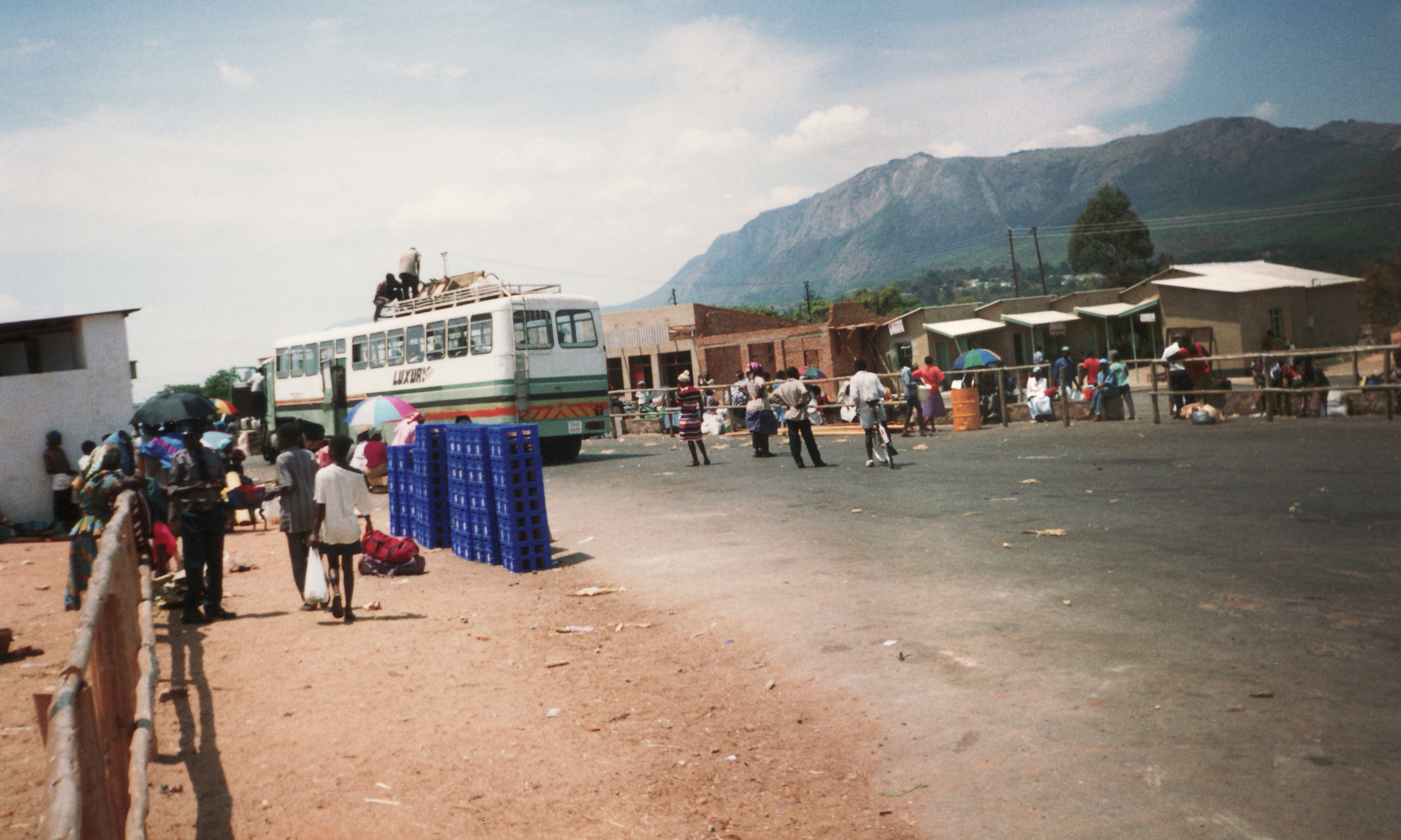
- Nyamhuka Township, Nyanga

- Location within Zimbabwe
- Coordinates: 18°12′36″S 32°44′24″E
- Country: Zimbabwe
- Province: Manicaland
- District: Nyanga District
- Elevation: 1,679 m (5,509 ft)

Population (2004 Estimate)
  - Total: 4,850
- Time zone: UTC+2 (CAT)

Nyanga, originally known as Inyanga, is a town in Zimbabwe.

== Location ==
It is located in Nyanga District, Manicaland Province, in Eastern Highland of Zimbabwe, along the international border with Mozambique. This location lies immediately north of Nyanga National Park in the Eastern Highlands, about 115 kilometres (71 mi), by road, north of Mutare, the third largest city. This location lies approximately 265 kilometres (165 mi), by road, east of Harare, the capital of Zimbabwe and the largest city in that country. Nyanga sits at an elevation of 1,679 metres (5,509 ft), above sea level.

== Overview ==
Mount Nyangani, the highest mountain in Zimbabwe, lies about 20 kilometres (12 mi), southeast of the town. Its highest peak rises to approximately 2,600 metres (8,500 ft), above sea level. Nyanga is primarily a tourist town and is a popular tourist destination with its fishing, golf courses, mountain hikes and holiday resorts. The Mtarazi Falls, inside Nyanga National Park, are the highest waterfalls in the country, cascading about 760 metres (2,490 ft), from top to bottom. The surrounding areas also contain many Stone Age and Iron Age archaeological remains such as pit structures, stone forts, terraces and pathways. Inside the town is the bustling township of Nyamhuka, around which there is an ever expanding growth of high and medium-density housing. Nyanga is also host to the largest army training camp in Zimbabwe, hosting recruits from across Africa.

== History ==
The Nyanga region has long been regarded as a place of great natural beauty. In 1896, Cecil John Rhodes wrote to his agent: "Dear McDonald, Inyanga is much finer than you described.....Before it is all gone, buy me quickly up to 400 square kilometres (100,000 acres), and be sure to take in the Pungwe Falls. I would like to try sheep and apple growing." Rhodes displaced the inhabitants and the chieftainship of the wonderful place- the Sakarombes of the Lion-Zebra (Shumba-Nyambizi totem) who found refuge in the semi-arid areas of Nyanga in Ruwangwe. Nyanga has been made famous in Scotland by the 1960 Hamish Henderson song Freedom Come-All-Ye as the birthplace of an unnamed black man who will overthrow the Afrikaaner Government. Nyanga is also mentioned in the 1977 folk song "It’s a Long Way to Mukumbura" by Mike Westcott and Leprechaun, where it is referred to as "JOC Inyanga".

== Population ==
The current population of Nyanga is not publicly known. According to the 1982 Population Census, the town had a population of 2,975. In 2004, the population of the town was estimated at 4,850. The next national population census in Zimbabwe is scheduled from 18 August 2012 through 28 August 2012.

== Climate ==
Climate data for Nyanga, Zimbabwe (1962-2018)
Month	Jan	Feb	Mar	Apr	May	Jun	Jul	Aug	Sep	Oct	Nov	Dec	Year
Record high °C (°F)	29.3 (84.7)	29.5 (85.1)	26.2 (79.2)	27.7 (81.9)	25.0 (77.0)	27.0 (80.6)	28.1 (82.6)	26.1 (79.0)	28.1 (82.6)	30.5 (86.9)	29.6 (85.3)	29.6 (85.3)	30.5 (86.9)
Mean daily maximum °C (°F)	21.4 (70.5)	21.0 (69.8)	20.9 (69.6)	20.0 (68.0)	18.1 (64.6)	16.6 (61.9)	16.1 (61.0)	18.4 (65.1)	21.1 (70.0)	22.5 (72.5)	21.8 (71.2)	21.2 (70.2)	19.9 (67.9)
Daily mean °C (°F)	17.2 (63.0)	17.0 (62.6)	16.4 (61.5)	15.1 (59.2)	12.9 (55.2)	11.2 (52.2)	10.7 (51.3)	12.6 (54.7)	15.1 (59.2)	16.9 (62.4)	16.9 (62.4)	16.9 (62.4)	14.9 (58.8)
Mean daily minimum °C (°F)	13.0 (55.4)	12.9 (55.2)	11.9 (53.4)	10.3 (50.5)	7.7 (45.9)	5.8 (42.4)	5.3 (41.5)	6.9 (44.4)	9.2 (48.6)	11.3 (52.3)	12.0 (53.6)	12.6 (54.7)	9.9 (49.8)
Record low °C (°F)	9.0 (48.2)	5.0 (41.0)	5.4 (41.7)	1.7 (35.1)	1.1 (34.0)	−2.4 (27.7)	−1.9 (28.6)	−1.3 (29.7)	1.7 (35.1)	1.9 (35.4)	5.5 (41.9)	6.6 (43.9)	−2.4 (27.7)
Average precipitation mm (inches)	262.4 (10.33)	239.6 (9.43)	105.2 (4.14)	56.0 (2.20)	21.1 (0.83)	22.8 (0.90)	12.4 (0.49)	11.6 (0.46)	9.8 (0.39)	44.5 (1.75)	111.9 (4.41)	234.6 (9.24)	1,131.9 (44.57)
Average precipitation days (≥ 1.0 mm)	17.3	17.7	9.9	6.5	3.7	4.7	2.8	2.0	1.7	4.8	8.8	15.7	95.8
Source: NOAA

== Image gallery ==
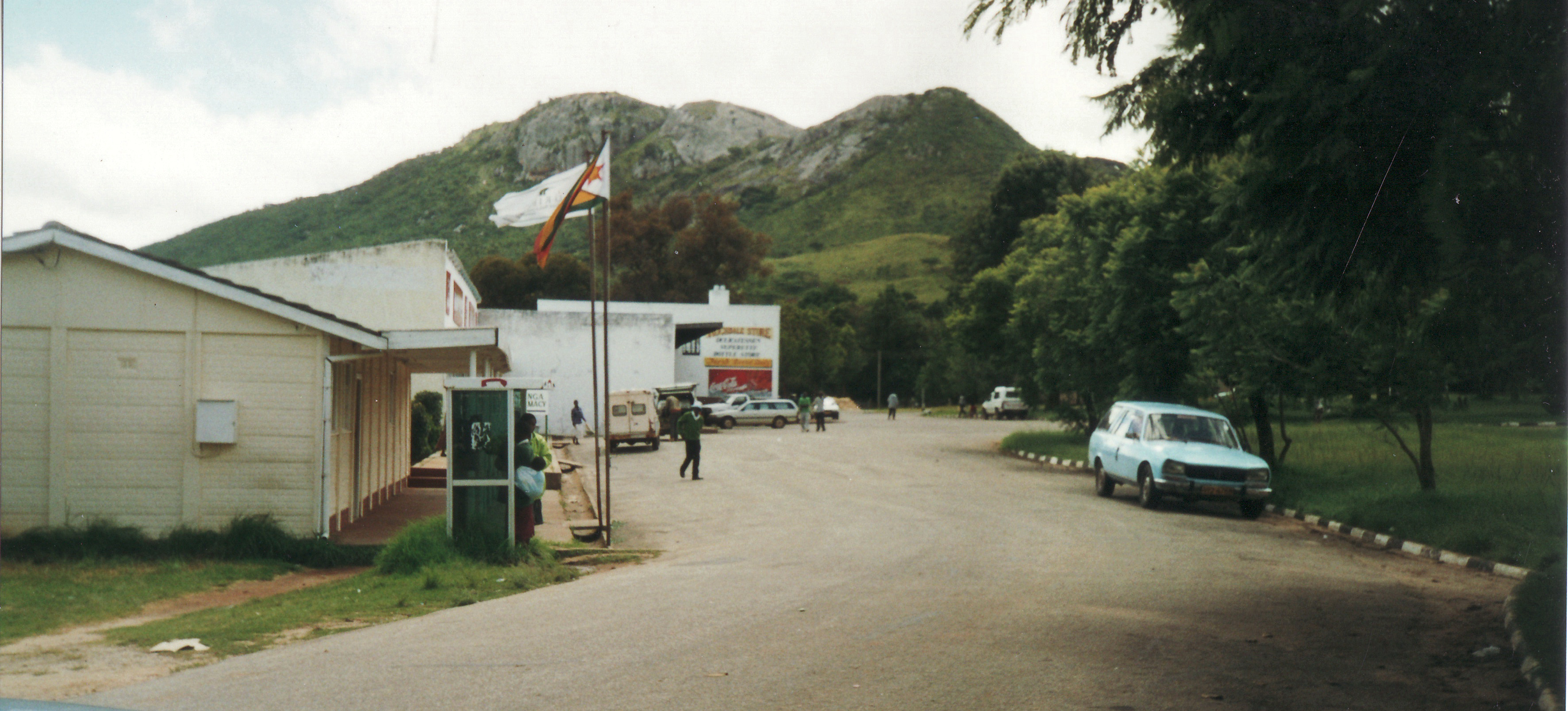
Nyanga village.

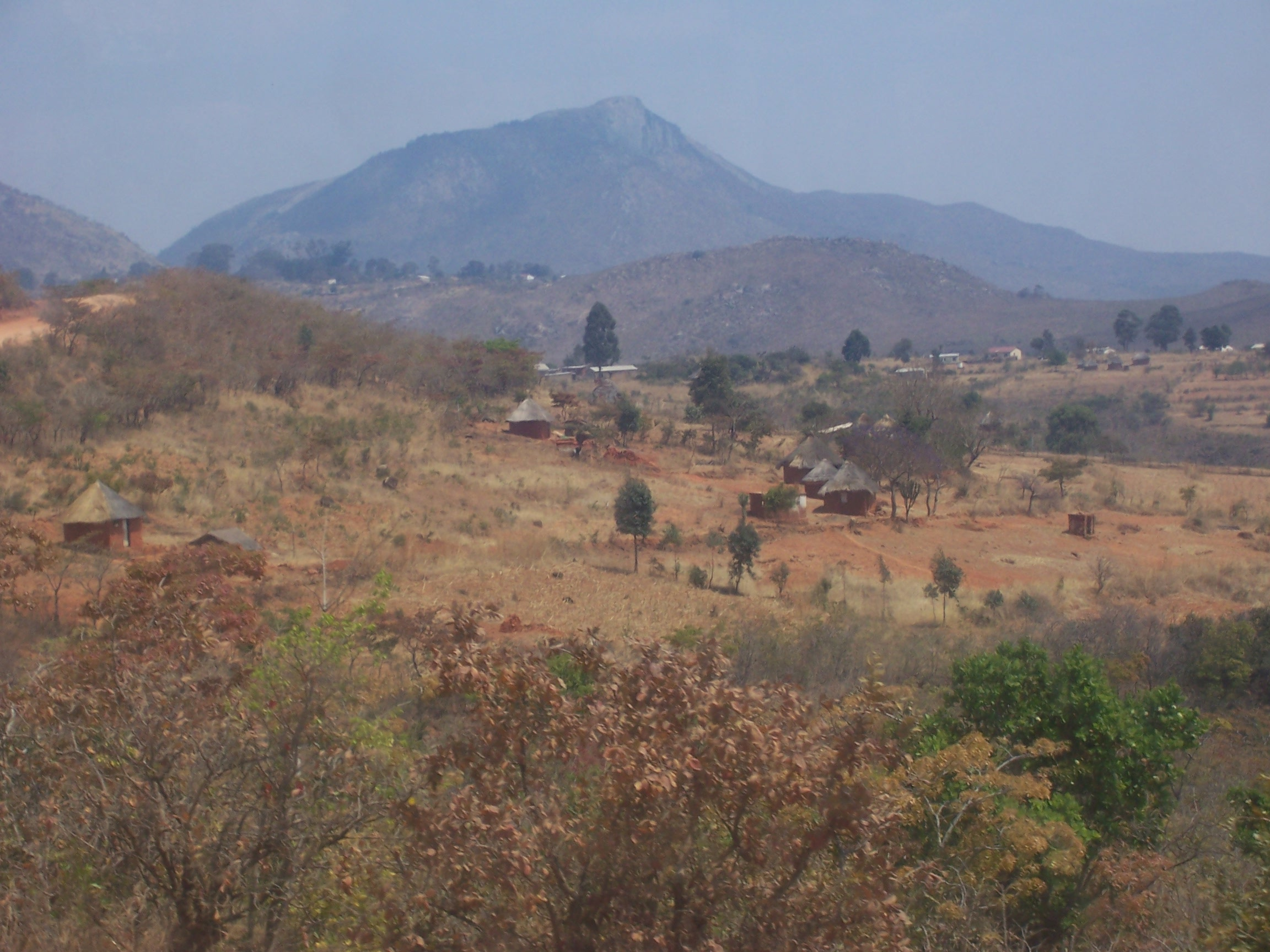
Rural areas north of Nyanga town.

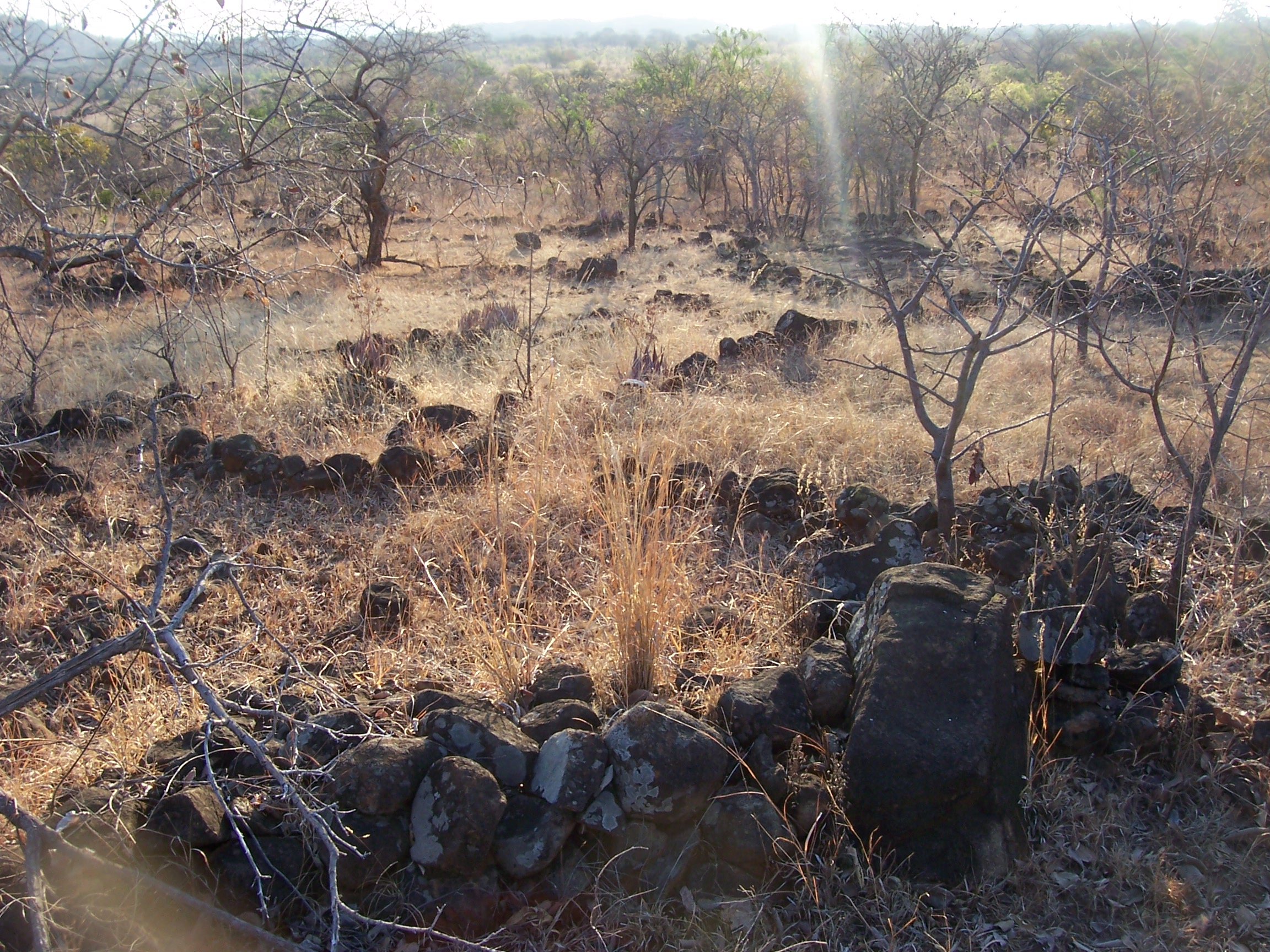
Ancient terracing in the Nyanga north area.

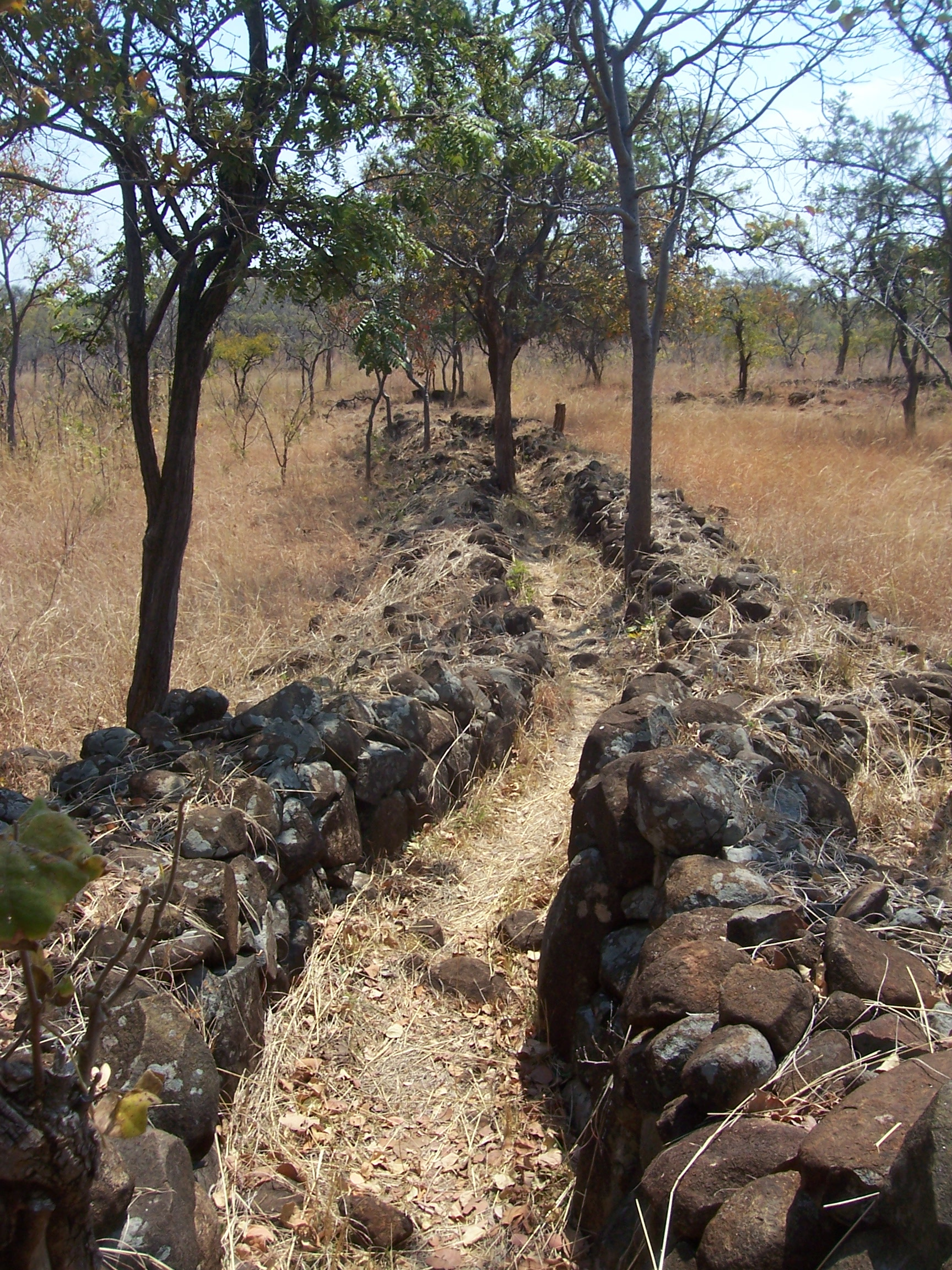
Ziwa ruins site north of Nyanga.

== See also ==
- Ziwa
- Rusape
- Catandica
- Honde Valley
