= Mount Nyangani =

Highest mountain in Zimbabwe

- Mount Inyangani
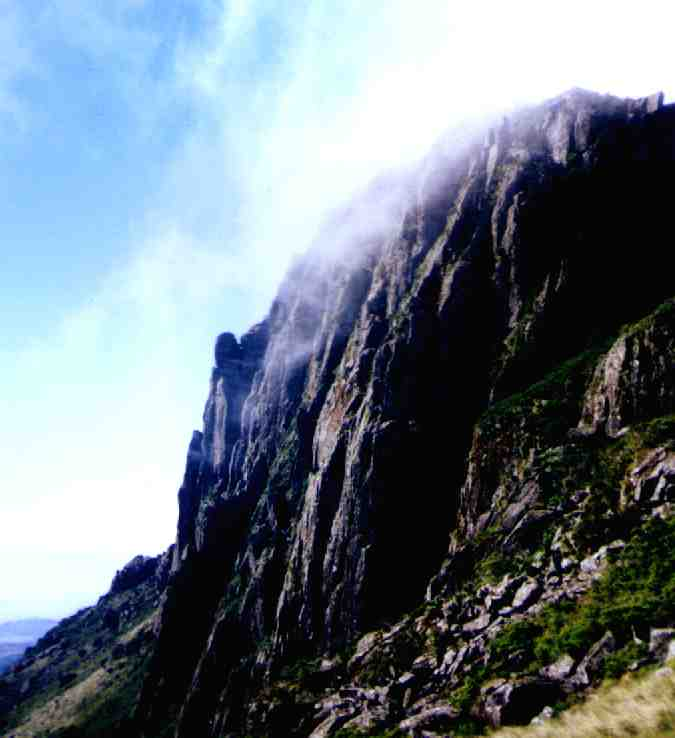
- Mount Nyangani summit

Highest point
- Elevation: 2,592 m (8,504 ft)
- Prominence: 1,521 m (4,990 ft)
- Listing: Country high point Ultra; Ribu
- Coordinates: 18°18′00″S 32°50′30″E

Geography
- Location within Zimbabwe
- Location: Zimbabwe

Climbing
- Easiest route: Hike

Mount Nyangani (formerly Mount Inyangani) is the highest mountain in Zimbabwe at 2,592 metres or 8,504 feet. The mountain is located within Nyanga National Park in Nyanga District, about 110 km (68 mi) north-northeast of Mutare. The summit lies atop a small outcrop of rock around 40 metres or 130 feet above the surrounding area. The remainder of the peak is a broad moor of mainly rolling hills and plateau with an area of about 8 km^{2}. The edges of this plateau then fall steeply to the east and west sides. The mountain vegetation is largely composed of heath around the summit plateau with evergreen forest along the wetter eastern slopes and grassland to the western side. Annual rainfall totals are high (around 2,200 millimetres or 87 inches) but long spells of dry weather occur during the winter period of May to August. Due to its relatively low elevation and tropical location, snowfall is very rare; the last recorded snowfall occurred in August 1935.

== Geology ==
The mountain is composed of an upper sill of dolerite and sandstone, with the harder dolerite forming cliffs and ridges. The dolerite sill and the sediments underlying it are probably part of the Umkondo Group. The Umkondo Group dolerite sill north of Nyangani, on the Kwaraguza Road, has been dated at 1099 Ma

== Access ==
The mountain can be accessed from four base points within Nyanga National Park:

1. The official car park, at the base of the Tourist Route. This is reached from Circular Drive.
2. The Mountain Club of Zimbabwe hut, on the Kwaraguza Road, accessed via Circular Drive.
3. Nyazengu Substation of Nyanga National Park, accessed via a road which goes south from just before the official car park.
4. Gleneagles Substation of Nyanga National Park, accessed via the Circular Drive, Kwaraguza Road and the Gleneagles Road or from Troutbeck via Nyafaru.

== Mountain hikes ==
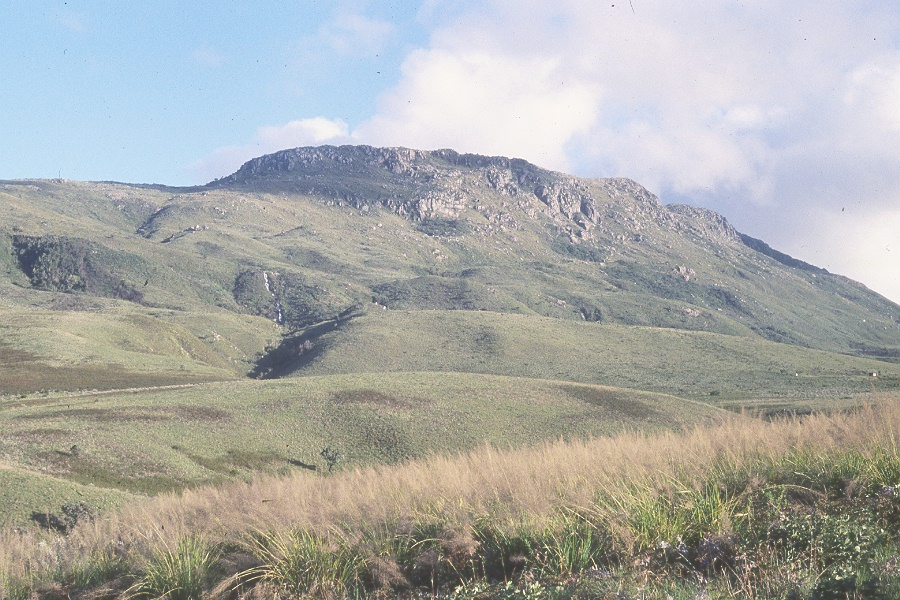
Mount Nyangani from the west. The falls in the middle ground are on the upper Nyamuziwa River and the Tourist Path ascends to their right. The start of the Tourist Path is in the lower right of the picture. The route from the Mountain Club of Zimbabwe hut is on the far side of the skyline ridge on the left of the picture.

The peak can be reached within 1–3 hours by anyone of average fitness. This ascent brings the hiker to an altitude of about 2,200 metres or 7,220 feet and the remainder is mostly walking across the gentler gradients of the summit plateau. The hazards here are produced by bewilderingly fast weather changes that can switch from sunny skies to thick fog, and under these conditions several fatalities have occurred due to hikers losing their way and falling down ravines. There are three ascents that follow paths:

- The main access to the mountain is a Tourist Path from the west. This ascends along the edge of the upper Nyamuziwa river and crosses onto the main plateau north of the summit. From there it heads south across the plateau to the summit.
- A second path runs from the Mountain Club of Zimbabwe hut. This paths follows the east side of the northern ridge, before joining the Tourist Path on the main plateau.
- A third path runs from Nyazengu, southwest of the mountain on the old road to the Pungwe River causeway (Pungwe Drift). It branches from the Nyazengu Trail and ascends to the base of Tucker's Gap, which has views of the montane rainforest to the southeast of the mountain (on the few days when the cloud does not cover the Gap). It is possible to ascend the north side of the gap (marked path) and then walk northwards across a boulder field to the main plateau, approaching the summit from the south. However, this last stretch has no path or markings.

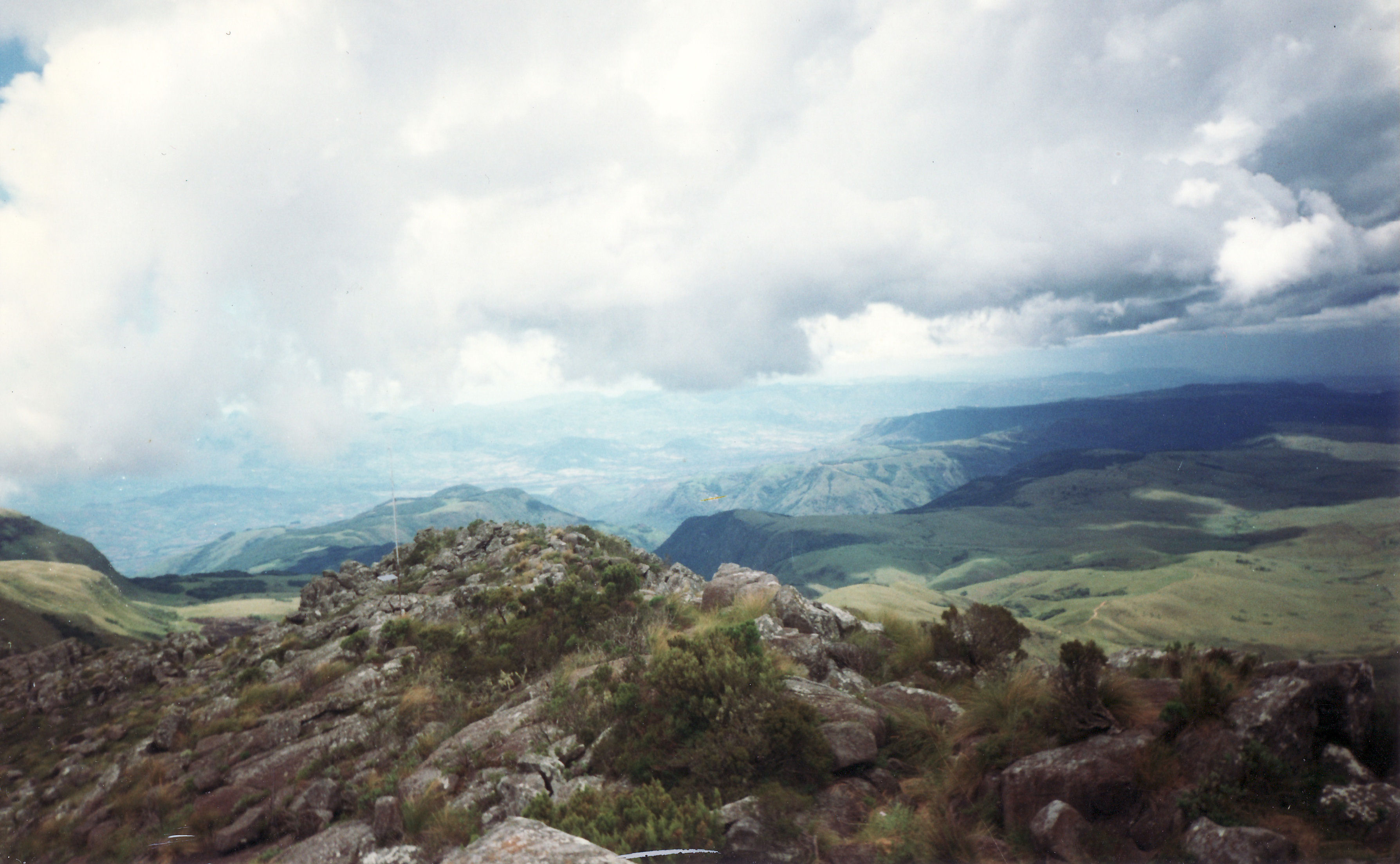
Mt. Nyangani view from the summit.

The mountain can also be ascended using the following routes which do not have paths or markings:

- The north-eastern ridge, between the Nyama and Kairezi Rivers. This route starts from the Gleneages Road, between the Nyama and Kairezi causeways, and follows a ridge up to the main plateau, northeast of the summit and east of the Tourist Path.
- Via Little Nyangani. This route starts from Gleneagles Substation, and ascends the heavily vegetated slope of Little Nyangani mountain, which lies to the east of the main plateau. From Little Nyangani, one can descend west to a rainforest-covered saddle, then ascend west onto the main plateau via Kairezi Falls, reaching the main plateau east of the summit.

The above are all walks or scrambles, without rock climbing involved. However, caution is advised, especially on unmarked routes, as the weather may change very rapidly: descent of cloud can result in visibility of less than 50 metres or 160 feet. This may well be the cause for a number of disappearances on the mountain, such as that of two teenage children of the then Minister of Finance, Tichaendepi Masaya.

== Rivers and waterfalls ==
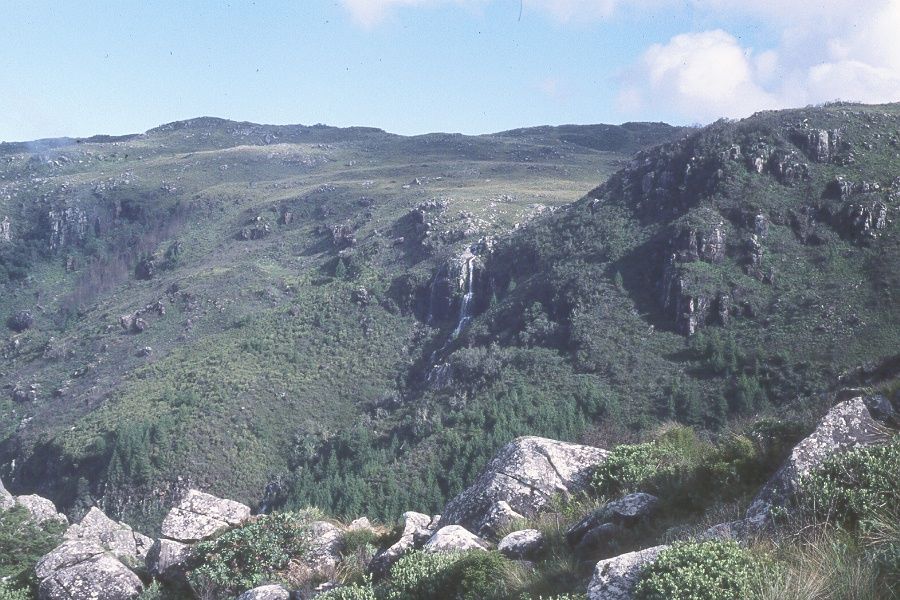
Nyama Falls.

Three rivers have their sources on Mount Nyangani: the Nyamuziwa River, the (Kairezi) Gairezi River and the Pungwe River. The first two are tributaries of the Mazowe River, which is itself a tributary of the Zambezi River.

The Nyama River, a tributary of the Kayirezi, falls off the main plateau in a waterfall on the northeast of the mountain and the Gairezi Falls are located on the east edge of the main plateau.

== Fauna ==
The fauna of the area are described under Nyanga National Park. Additional information:

- The clawless otter is common in the upper Gairezi River, near the mountain
- The Inyangani river frog is an endangered amphibian named for the mountain. It can be found in rocky, fast-flowing streams in the montane grassland.

== Flora ==
- Protea asymmetrica, or the Inyanga sugarbush, is endemic to the area.
- Afrosciadium rhodesicum, a species of flowering carrot, is endemic to the area.

== Archaeology ==
Iron Age ruins have been found on Little Nyangani and on a hill west of the summit, the latter better-preserved, but not on the summit plateau .

== In popular culture ==
The film Mysteries of Mount Inyangani looks at some of the mysteries and myths about the mountain.

== See also ==
- Geography of Zimbabwe
- Lists of mountains
