= Cashel, Zimbabwe =

Cashel
- Village
- Location within Zimbabwe
- Coordinates: 19.542698767313578°S 32.7874087429389°E
- Country: Zimbabwe
- Province: Manicaland
- District: Chimanimani District
- Elevation: 1,190 m (3,900 ft)

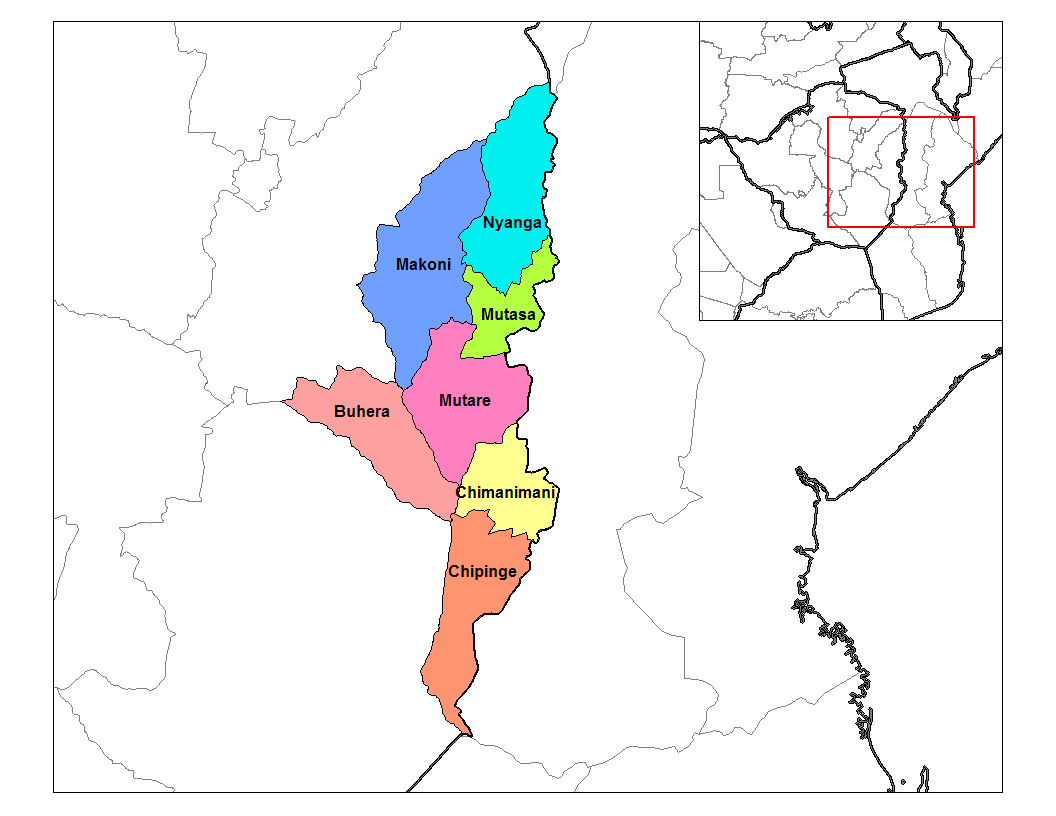
Cashel is a part of the Chimanimani District in the Manicaland Province of Zimbabwe

Cashel is a village in Chimanimani District of Manicaland Province, Zimbabwe. It is located near the Mozambique border, just north of the Chimanimani Mountains. Forestry, bananas, wheat, and various cash crops are grown in the area. It was originally called Penkridge but was changed to Cashel in 1957. It was named after Lt. Col. E. Cashel, a former member of the British South Africa Police and the Rhodesian Volunteers, who retired to this area after World War I. The Cashel valley is well known for radio and television commercials, which sought to extol the quality of its peas, beans and other agricultural products.

== Toponymy ==
The name's history goes back to the time when Sub Inspector Rowan Cashel of the B.S.A. Police took up a farm, which he called Cashel, in the North Melsetter district. He later became a Colonel in the First World War.

The area was first known as Penkridge, the name of a neighbouring farm on which a Postal Agency had been established in 1911. It was operated in conjunction with Mr. Cashel, but later a missionary from Mutambara took it over until 1934 when he emigrated to South Africa.

The locality was originally known as Melsetter North, but as this was confused with Melsetter, other names were used, depending who was running the Post Office. The district was inhabited by descendants of the Steyn families, who had arrived with the early trekking parties, and one such post office became known as Johannesrust, in memory of Johannes Steyn who had farmed there, but there was confusion with mail addressed to Johannesrust and Johannesburg. As mail moved slowly in these days, such misdirections caused much consternation amongst the local residents and it was decided by the North Melsetter Farmers Association that the name should be changed to Tandaai, after a river of the same name. The farm on which the agency was situated was called Kranskop, after a high hill near the junction of Tandaai and Umvumvumvu Rivers. The change occurred on 1 September 1929, three years after Johannesrust first came into being. Cashel became the official designation of area when a Post Office was provided in 1957. A Rural Council Office and Police Station were later established in the village. Cashel and South Melsetter was changed to Chipinga in 1907.

== History ==
The Pink Map: showing areas in Africa claimed by Portugal before the 1890 British Ultimatum and the resulting Anglo-Portuguese Treaty of 11 June 1891.

Evidence of human inhabitation in Cashel possibly dates back to the Iron Age, the likely timeframe from which several cave paintings date back to.

Rock paintings in nearby mountains indicate the arrival of Bushmen to the area, depicting scenes of Bushmen hunting elephants, buffalo, elands, reedbucks, and other animals. The paintings also depict traditional Bushmen dances.

=== Ndau ===
Later the Ndau settled in the region and they encountered Portuguese explorers in the 1500s.

The Ndau are an ethnic group which inhabits the areas in south-eastern Zimbabwe in the districts of Chipinge and Chimanimani in which they are natives. They are also found in parts of Bikita, in the Zambezi valley, in central Mozambique all the way to the coast and in central Malawi. The name "Ndau" is a derivation from the people's traditional salutation "Ndau wee!" in greetings and other social settings. When the Ngoni observed this, they called them the Ndau people, the name itself meaning the land, the place or the country in their language. One hypothesis suggests that the name may be derived from the Nguni expression 'Amading'indawo'. However, this etymology remains debated. Historical accounts by João dos Santos indicate that the ancestors of the Ndau were already living in parts of present-day Zimbabwe and Mozambique by the sixteenth century. Major Ndau groups include the Magova, Mashanga, Vatomboti, Madanda, and Teve, although classifications may vary among sources. Ancient Ndau People met with the Khoi/San during the first trade with the Arabs at Shiriyandenga currently known as Mapungubwe. They traded with Arabs with "Mpalu" "Njeti" and "Vukotlo" these are the red, white and blue coloured cloths together with golden beads. Ndau people traded traditional medicinal herbs, animal skins, bones, and other locally valued goods.

=== Gazaland ===
Gazaland is the historical name for the region in southeast Africa, in modern-day Mozambique and Zimbabwe, which extends northward from the Komati River at Delagoa Bay in Mozambique's Maputo Province to the Pungwe River in central Mozambique.

It was a district of the former Portuguese East Africa. Its name was derived from a Swazi chief named Gaza, a contemporary of Shaka Zulu. It covered most of present-day Gaza and Inhambane provinces, and the southern portions of Manica and Sofala provinces.

Refugees from various clans oppressed by Dingane (Shaka's successor) were welded into one tribe by Gaza's son Soshangane, his followers becoming known as Shangaan or Mashangane. A section of them was called Maviti or Landeens (i.e. couriers), a designation which persisted as a tribal name. Between 1833 and 1836 Soshangane made himself master of the country as far north as the Zambezi and captured the Portuguese posts at Delagoa Bay, Inhambane, Sofala and Sena, killing nearly all the inhabitants. The Portuguese reoccupied their posts, but held them with great difficulty, while in the interior Soshangane continued his conquests, depopulating large regions. Soshangane died about 1856, and his son Umzila, receiving some help from the Portuguese at Delagoa Bay in a struggle against a brother for the chieftain-ship, ceded to them the territory south of the Komati River. North of that river as far as the Zambezi, and inland to the continental plateau, Umzila established himself in independence, a position he maintained till his death (c .1884). His chief rival was a Goan named Manuel António de Sousa, also known as Gouveia, who came to Africa about 1850. Having obtained possession of a crown estate (prazo) in the Gorongosa District, he ruled there as a feudal lord while acknowledging himself a Portuguese subject. Gouveia captured much of the country in the Zambezi valley from the Shangaan, and was appointed by the Portuguese captain-general of a large region.

Probably the first European to penetrate any distance inland from the Sofala coast since the Portuguese gold-seekers of the 16th century was St Vincent Whitshed Erskine, who explored the region between the Limpopo and Pungwe (1868-1875). Portugal's hold on the coast had been more firmly established at the time of Umzila's death, and Gungunhana, his successor, was claimed as a vassal, while efforts were made to open up the interior. This led in 1890–1891 to collisions on the borderland of the plateau with the newly established British South Africa Company, and to the arrest by the company's agents of Gouveia, who was, however, freed and returned to Mozambique via Cape Town. The border between the British and Portuguese colonies was set by the Anglo-Portuguese Treaty of 11 June 1891. An offer made by Gungunhana (1891) to come under British protection was not accepted. In 1892 Gouveia was killed in a war with a native chief. Gungunhana maintained his independence until 1895, when he was captured by a Portuguese force and exiled, first to Lisbon and afterwards to the Azores, where he died in 1906. With the capture of Gungunyana opposition to Portuguese rule largely ceased.

=== Colonial rivalry ===
Gaza, a Swazi king chief pushed north by the Zulu King Shaka's expansion, ruled an area known as Gazaland in the early 19th century. Gaza's son Soshangane expanded Gazaland to include the Chimanimani district and his followers became known as Shangaan. The Shangaan people first began raiding the area of present-day Cashel in the mid-19th century. After Soshangane's death in about 1856, his son Mzila, the chief of the Gaza people sought to rule the area. Around 1873, Mzila, began conquering the area, forcing the Ngorima people who previously inhabited the land to flee. During his rule, Mzila signed a number of treaties with Portuguese colonizers, allowing them to erect trading posts in the area. His main rival was a Goan named Manuel António de Sousa, also known as Gouveia, who came to Africa about 1850. Mzila continued to rule until his death in 1884. Mzila was succeeded by Gungunhana, however, upon Mzila's death, the Portuguese laid claim to all of Manicaland (present-day eastern Zimbabwe, where Cashel is located). In 1887, the Portuguese claimed all the territory belonging to Lobengula, the king of Matabeleland (in present-day western Zimbabwe). This claim drew protest from the British government. In 1888, Portuguese gold miners began organizing what would become the Mozambique Company, and began conquering tribes to the west of their pre-1887 positions. This drew the attention of Cecil Rhodes and other British colonists in the region, who would create the British South Africa Company in 1889 to further expand east of Matabeleland. In March 1890, a British expedition arrived in Manicaland, where colonists established a gold mine. In January 1891, a British expedition meant to meet with Gungunhana passed through the Chimanimani Mountains, where Cashel is located. On 4 March 1891, the British expedition met with Gungunhana, who appeared to deem the British more trustworthy than the Portuguese. On 9 March, a treaty known as the Gazaland Concession was signed, and Gungunhana commercial and mineral rights to most of his kingdom to the British South African Company in exchange for cash payments, rifles, and ammunition. However, the British party to this treaty knew that it was not in accordance with international law, and disputes in the area between the British and Portuguese continued. The border between the British and Portuguese colonies was set by the Anglo-Portuguese Treaty of 11 June 1891. This treaty judged that most of Gungunhana's land would fall under Portuguese control. In 1892 Gouveia was killed in a war with a native chief. Gungunhana maintained his independence until 1895, when he was captured by a Portuguese force and exiled and he died in 1906. With the capture of Gungunhana, opposition to Portuguese rule largely ceased. Three Treks to the Chiminmani district in 1893, 1894 and 1895 by settlers from South Africa resulted in the growth of a farming community, with the last trek of Henry and Steyn settling in the North of the area, which would later become Cashel. The settlers faced a major setback due to the rinderpest disease, but eventually thrived and after some confusion about its name, became a successful farming community with a school, library and hotel. The Rhodesian Bush war played a major part in the area after Mozambique gained its independence and the border became an easy access route, with several attacks resulting in many farmers leaving.

=== Steyn-Henry trek of 1895 ===
On 4 January 1893 the Moodie Trek arrived at the farm Waterfalls and settled in what would later be called Chipinga or South Melsetter. The trek leader Thomas Moodie named the area Melsetter due to his Scottish ancestry. The Martin Trek followed and arrived on 14 October 1894 and settled mostly in central Gazaland which would become Melsetter. The third big Trek and one which opened up the most northern part of Gazaland, was that conducted by John Henry and JGF Steyn in 1895. The Trek fever was growing, especially in the Free State where farmers were beginning to realize that their farms were getting smaller and smaller, and where others saw that it was not so easy to obtain land. The idea to move into the "Land of Rhodes" had gripped the Freestaters who by now had lost several hundred emigrants. In the Kroonstad district various people contemplated trekking to German West Africa, and then again to North West Transvaal, but a decision either way was never made. The news that farms were available in Rhodesia at the nominal figure of only about £30 caught the imagination of those people who have always grown up with the soil and whose greatest desire was to possess a piece of ground themselves. The news in the press that plentiful and fertile agricultural land was still to be had led some of the local inhabitants to convene a meeting. Here it was decided to appoint a small committee to proceed up to this hinterland of Rhodes and to inspect possible areas of settlement. They were also instructed to take up several farms should they be satisfied with the prospects. JGF Steyn and John Henry were deputized to travel to Gazaland and investigate. They left Kroonstad on 3 August 1894 and travelled to East London, from where they travelled by boat to Beira. From Beira they travelled by steamship up the Pungwe river to Chimoio and from there they used rail, transport wagons and foot to get to Umtali. They met the acting magistrate Dunbar Moodie and selected land in the Umvumvumvu valley. The farm Johannesrust had been selected for JGF Steyn, Weltevrede for the eldest son Johannes, Pietershoek for Pieter Willem the 2nd son, Hendriksdal for the 3rd son Hendrik, Diepfontein for the 4th son Stoffel, Palingkloof for the 5th son Christiaan and Perdekraal for the 6th son Theuns, while the youngest son Lucas would stay with JGF Steyn on Johannesrust. They got back to Kroonstad on 10 October 1894. By December 1894 they had sold all of the farms in the Free State and moved to nearby Bothaville, where JGF rented the farm Witfontein until May 1895.

All of the trek families met at Schoemansdrif on the Vaal river on 8 May 1895 and 17 wagons and 114 people set off for Gazaland.

After an arduous journey through the Transvaal, into Bechuanaland, through the Tuli block and across rivers and over mountains and the odd encounter with lions, they arrived in the Umvumvumvu valley on Christmas Eve 1895.

When they arrived they built pole and dagga huts and planted crops to feed the community. Malaria killed many people and at least five of the Steyn children died of cerebral malaria. In 1896 Rinderpest swept down from Uganda and Tanzania and killed most of the cattle in the area. In 1901 East Coast Fever arrived and curtailed cattle farming further. Farmers took it in turns to house a farm school until eventually Johannesrust farm school was built, it later became Tandai school and finally Cashel school. There were no roads and these had to be planned and built.

=== Chimurenga & Rinderpest ===
"Melsetter was nearly drawn into international affairs when Paul Kruger tried to persuade the Portuguese Government to arrest Cecil Rhodes on his arrival in Beira and to take him to Melsetter where the Transvaal authorities would be ready to take charge of him, but the Portuguese authorities would have nothing to do with the scheme.

The first eighteen months had been one long struggle, with little food, no cash, difficulties of marketing any saleable surplus, and all capital locked up mainly in cattle, but at the beginning of 1896 prospects were good and the outlook was bright. Against the background of hopes and difficulties two events started during the year which set back the smooth development: Rinderpest and the fears of a native rising.

The beneficial occupation clause was difficult to fulfil while farms were not producing a livelihood, and many farmers left their wives to carry on farming operations while they undertook the long trek away from Melsetter with their wagons and oxen to earn money in transport work. The result was that the devastating scourge of Rinderpest hit them very hard indeed.

The disease crossed the Zambezi into Rhodesia in February 1896; the spread was rapid with infection carried by game, and the whole country was swiftly affected. Little was known about prevention or cure of the disease, and many Melsetter farmers lost so many cattle that they were forced to give in and move away, abandoning any progress they had been able to make on their farms. Such oxen as survived were at a premium, and transport charges soared, which was another hazard for those who remained in a district so dependent on ox transport. Food was very short, and Government supplies of rice, bully beef, tea and other necessities were sent up by donkey wagon and were rationed out each week in the township. In June the Farmer's Association expressed its thanks for what had been done to alleviate the position.

In July Henry Sawerthal, in charge of Company transport between Beira and Salisbury, sent out an official notice commandeering all trek oxen belonging to farmers in the Melsetter district for the transport of food supplies from Chimoio to Salisbury. All the farmers whose cattle were purchased considered themselves very well paid, except Dunbar Moodie, who waited for three months and then complained that he had not received enough money for his.

In order to get supplies to Melsetter some highly impracticable proposals were suggested from Salisbury. One was that oxwagons should leave from Gazaland in order to return with food, and Sawerthal commented that such a modus operandi would devastate the district by rinderpest. Then it was suggested that wagons should come from Fort Victoria to the western bank of the Sabi, from where supplies would be carried across the river and taken to Melsetter either by carriers or by wagons sent down to the east bank.

Efforts were made to get donkeys or mules to replace oxen, but these were at a premium. Carriers were sent from Melsetter to load up with requirements at Chimoio, where there were plenty of provisions.

In May Dunbar wrote that farmers near him were uneasy about the Matabele disturbance, and he felt that something should be done to allay any fears, although he did not think that any public demonstration would be wise as the natives were quiet but might rebel if there were signs of fear or misgivings on the part of the settlers.

The FA June meeting resolved that if farmers heard or saw anything definite to excite suspicions relative to the rising of natives they should report at once to Longden, and asked that spies should be placed on the district border as a precaution against a rising, and recommended that Melsetter township be the site for a laager in case it became necessary to form one.

Anxiety mounted among the scattered farming populace, and Steyn and others from Cashel moved into larger at Elandspruit on Rocklands. This took Martin by surprise: Steyn said that they had been advised to gather in one spot as danger was near and a rising feared, but when Longden reassured him he said that they would be happy to return to their homes.

Longden was supplied with 50 rifles and 25 000 rounds, and a volunteer Burgher force was organised and troops were stationed in Umtali, from where the Postmaster kept Longden informed of news from other parts of the country. Martin was worried about reports about the war: losses in the Matopo Hills, murders in Mazoe, rising in Fort Victoria; and he asked Longden whether it would not be advisable, if they were true, that all available forces should be concentrated."

=== Cashel Valley brand ===
Cashel developed into a successful farming community, with a post office, local store, library, hotel and library. The valley was famous for its tinned fruit and vegetables marketed as Cashel Valley and sold throughout the country. Today the brand still exists, but is owned by the Cairns Food Company. A local school was built and was originally called Johannesrust school, later Tandaai and finally Cashel school.

"Cashel lies in the shadow of the Black Mountain an impressive range forming part of the Chimanimani mountains. The local hotel, which was a favourite holiday resort, was named the Black Mountain Inn.

Nearby is the Nyanyadzi Irrigation scheme, which consists of a series of plots allocated to African farmers. Here the soil is particularly rich and good results are obtained in growing bananas, wheat and other cash crops. The scheme was originally conceived by the late Mr. E.D. Alvord, a former Director of African Agriculture, and the first agricultural missionary to come to Africa. He worked at Mutambara after arriving from America, and it was while living here that he saw the potential of the Nyanyadzi scheme."

=== Rhodesian Bush War ===
==== Alouette crash ====
On 23 December 1975, an Aérospatiale Alouette III helicopter of the South African Air Force carrying a two-man crew and four Rhodesian Army officers crashed near Cashel in Rhodesia after it collided with a hawser cable mid-flight. The accident dealt a severe blow to the Rhodesian Security Forces, then fighting bitterly against ZANLA and ZIPRA insurgents in the Rhodesian Bush War, for the officers involved were some of its best and would prove difficult to replace.

An Alouette III helicopter of the South African Air Force (SAAF) crewed by an SAAF pilot, Air Sub-Lieutenant Johannes van Rensberg, and a SAAF flight technician, Sergeant Pieter van Rensberg, was flying from Umtali to Melsetter with four senior Rhodesian Army officers as passengers. These were Major General John Shaw, Colonel David Parker, Captain John Lamb and Captain Ian Robinson. The Alouette III was one of several loaned to Rhodesia to assist in counter-insurgency operations during the Bush War.

Flying at low altitude in accordance with procedure and en route to troops stationed on the border for a Christmas visit, the helicopter flew into a rusty, long-forgotten hawser cable at around 10 a.m. on Shinda Orchards Farm near Cashel, just south of Umtali and 3 kilometres (1.9 mi) from the Mozambican border. The cable had years before been used to pass logs down a steep slope and was unmarked on any maps. The airframe began to break up as the helicopter spun out of control and crashed. All on board were killed except for the pilot, who was seriously injured, losing one of his legs. He was fitted with an artificial leg and got the nickname, Peg-a-Leg van Rensburg.

==== White exodus ====
By late 1978, The New York Times reported that advances made by the Zimbabwe African National Liberation Army led to the exodus of about 40 white families, who had farmed the land. Despite this, the few who remained told the New York Times they would remain regardless of what happened, in spite of deteriorating military control by the white Rhodesian government. The newspaper also reported that white farmers, who ran commercially profitable farms like those in Cashel, were crucial for the white government's finances, and that the government used income generated from these farms to purchase foreign weapons, such as American military helicopters.

=== 21st century ===
In May 2011, Pambazuka News reported that a militia associated with the governing ZANU–PF party burned down a number of houses belonging to local Movement for Democratic Change leaders in the Cashel Valley.

==== Cyclone Idai ====
Tropical Cyclone Idai (/ɪˈdaɪ, ˈiːdaɪ/), one of the worst tropical cyclones on record to affect Africa and the Southern Hemisphere, hit the region in March 2019. The storm caused catastrophic damage, and a humanitarian crisis in Mozambique, Zimbabwe, and Malawi, leaving more than 1,300 people dead and many more missing. Heavy rains fell across much of eastern Zimbabwe as the cyclone meandered along the nation's border with Mozambique. In Chimanimani District, where Cashel is located, the storm dumped between 200 millimetres (7.9 in) to 400 millimetres (16 in) in the area. Widespread flash flooding ensued, claiming at least 169 lives in Chimanimani District. An unknown number of bodies were swept into neighboring areas of Mozambique, and at least 82 were confirmed to have been buried as far as 40 kilometres (25 mi) into that nation. At least 232 people were injured in Chimanimani.

The district saw extensive damage caused by widespread flash flooding. The Nyahonde River burst its banks and inundated numerous communities in the area. Destruction of numerous bridges and roads in eastern Chimanimani isolated many residents.

== Geography ==
The village is located at latitude 19.542698767313578 S, Longitude 32.7874087429389 E. The elevation of the village is 1,190 metres (3,900 ft) above sea level. The village receives an average of 905 millimetres (35.6 in) of precipitation annually.

== Notable people ==
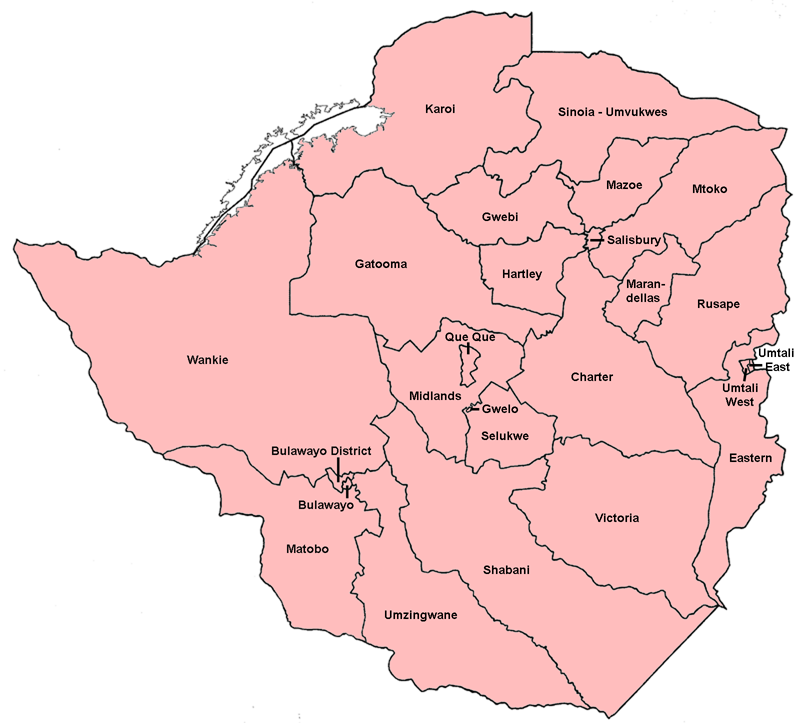
Rural constituencies used at the 1974 Rhodesian General Election. Eastern, below Umtali on the Mozambique border, included Cashel, Melsetter and Chipinga.

- Philip Abraham Cremer MBE, teacher who took over and developed Johannesrust School, where he was the Principal. He was awarded an MBE for exemplary service. He married Engela (Lalie) Helena Steyn, the granddaughter of the trek leader JGF Steyn.
- Deryck Lamb, was born in Newcastle upon Tyne, England and was awarded the Distinguished Flying Cross in World War II.
- Nigel Lamb, (born 17 August 1956) an English aerobatics pilot and the 2014 Red Bull Air Race World Champion.
- John Hamilton Wright, local farmer and MP for the Eastern constituency representing the Rhodesian Front party of Ian Smith in the 1974 election. He lost his seat in 1977 when he switched to the Rhodesia Action Party which opposed then Prime Minister Ian Smith.

== See also ==
- Anglo-Portuguese Treaty of 1891
- British South Africa Company
- Cecil Rhodes
- Chimanimani District
- Chimanimani Mountains
- Eastern Highlands
- Gaza Empire
- Gungunhana
- Land Reform in Zimbabwe
- Manicaland Province
- Mutambara, Manicaland
- Ndau People
- Nigel Lamb
- Rhodesian Bush War
- Soshangane
- Thomas Moodie
- White Zimbabweans
