= Tafataona Mahoso =

Zimbabwean government official

Dr. Tafataona P. Mahoso

Chairman Media and Information Commission
- In office 2003–2008
- President: Robert Mugabe
- Succeeded by: Chinondidyachii Mararike

Personal details
- Born: 12 January 1957 (age 69) Southern Rhodesia
- Party: ZANU-PF

Tafataona P. Mahoso, dubbed 'the Media Hangman' by local and international media, was the controversial and vitriolic chairman of the Media and Information Commission (MIC), an organ that was created by Jonathan Moyo to control the media in Zimbabwe, pursuant to Zimbabwe's Access to Information and Protection of Privacy Act (AIPPA). He was replaced by Chinondidyachii Mararike in early 2008 when a judge determined that he was unfit to perform his duties as the chairman of MIC because he was 'politically biased.'.

He was controversially reappointed to a Zimbabwe media board in October 2009 even though a parliamentary committee gave him low marks during an interview.

== Education ==
He holds a Bachelor of Arts (BA) degree in Literature and History from Roberts Wesleyan College, Chili, New York. He was awarded a Masters of Arts (MA) degree in Literature from Ohio University. In 1971, he got a PhD in African Studies and History from Temple University.

== War with the Media ==
AIPPA gave him unlimited and boundless and complete powers to oversee the media in Zimbabwe, especially the print media.

=== The Tribune ===
He closed down The Tribune and its sister newspaper The Weekend Tribune, on the ground that they did not inform him of a change of ownership.

=== ANZ ===
He has fought to deny a license to ANZ, publishers of the Daily News. Over the years, he has been dragged to court where he has defended provisions of AIPPA that gives the power to shut down newspapers.

== Columnist ==
He writes a weekly column in the Sunday Mail, which he regularly uses to support government policies on one hand and to attack perceived enemies of the state on the other. He has attacked Gideon Gono on the cash shortages in Zimbabwe in the same column.

== Personal life ==
Little is known about Mahoso's personal life. The scanty reports available indicate that during his time in America, attending school and teaching, he cohabited with a woman called Ruth Laughlin

== See also ==
- Jonathan Moyo
- Tobaiwa Mudede
