= Chimanimani District =

District in Zimbabwe

Coordinates: 19°48′S 32°52′E

Chimanimani District within Zimbabwe

Chimanimani, originally known as Melsetter, is a mountainous district in Manicaland Province of eastern Zimbabwe. The district headquarters is the town of Chimanimani.

== Geography ==
The district has an area of 3,450.14 km^{2}. It is bounded to the east by Mozambique, to the north and northwest by Mutare District, to the west by Buhera District, and to the south by Chipinge District.

The Chimanimani Mountains extend through the eastern part of the district, stretching for some 50 km (31 mi) and forming the border with Mozambique. The mountains are distinguished by large peaks, carved from a rifted quartzite massif. The highest peak is Monte Binga at 2,436 m (8,005 ft). Chimanimani National Park (171.1 km^{2}) protects the Zimbabwean portion of the range.

The Haroni River runs from north to south in a steep-sided valley west of the Chimanimani massif. It joins the Rusitu River in the southwest corner of the district, which then flows east into Mozambique to join the Buzi River. The village of Chimanimani lies west of the Haroni.

Lower mountains run north and south through the center of the district. The western portion of the district lies in the valley of the Save River and its tributary the Odzi, which form the district's western boundary.

== People ==
The population of the district was 134,939 in the 2012 census. The district's population is 94% rural.

== Administration ==
The district is divided into 23 administrative wards. The administrative headquarters are in the town of Chimanimani.

The district is divided into two Assembly parliamentary constituencies, Chimanimani East and Chimanimani West.

== Transport ==
The district has three tarred roads. The main road between Mutare and Masvingo (P4, formerly A9) passes through the western edge of the district. The A10 road branches off the P4 in Wengezi in the district's northwestern corner, and runs north and south through the center of the district. A branch road connects Chimanimani town to the A10.

A road branches eastwards from the northern portion of the A10, extending through Cashel to border post with Mozambique.

== History ==
Cyclone Idai struck the district on 15 March 2019, bringing high winds and torrential rains that caused extensive flooding. The cyclone caused at least 169 deaths in the district, and extensive damage to crops, houses, and roads.

== Chimanimani Mountains ==
Much of the range is composed of quartzite ridges, with Monte Binga (2,436m) the highest peak in the range and second-highest peak in Zimbabwe. The mountains are home to montane woodlands and grasslands, highland tropical forests, and high-elevation grasslands and heathlands.

The Chimanimani Mountains are protected by Chimanimani National Park, and are one of Zimbabwe's finest mountain wilderness areas and a popular hiking destination. Scenic Bridal Veil Falls are within the national park, close to the town of Chimanimani.

During the Zimbabwe independence war, mountain passes in the Chimanimani area were frequently used by guerilla fighters between Zimbabwe and their camps in Mozambique, who laid mines along local roads to disrupt the local economy. Because of this, the passes were heavily mined by Rhodesian government forces. Land mines have continued to be a real hazard in the area, particularly after heavy rain.

== Chimanimani town ==
The town of Chimanimani was founded by Thomas Moodie in 1892 and in 1895 it was moved to its current site and was officially called Melsetter after Moodie's family home in Scotland. The name was changed in 1982, after Zimbabwean independence (1980). The name initially was made Mandidzudzure, but after consultation with local residents, this was changed again to the current one. According to the 1982 Population Census, the town has a population of 1,370. The town had a tourist office, a bank, grocery, curio shops and the faded colonial Chimanimani Arms Hotel. In 1995 it also had a travellers' hostel called Heaven, with a permaculture smallholding which was a popular source of employment in the village. Frog & Fern Cottages on the way to Bridal Veil Falls provide self-catering cottages within walking distance of the town.

The Chimanimani Arts Festival was a free music festival that began in 1998, and was held in August of each year. It was discontinued during Zimbabwe's post-2013 political crisis.

== Gallery ==
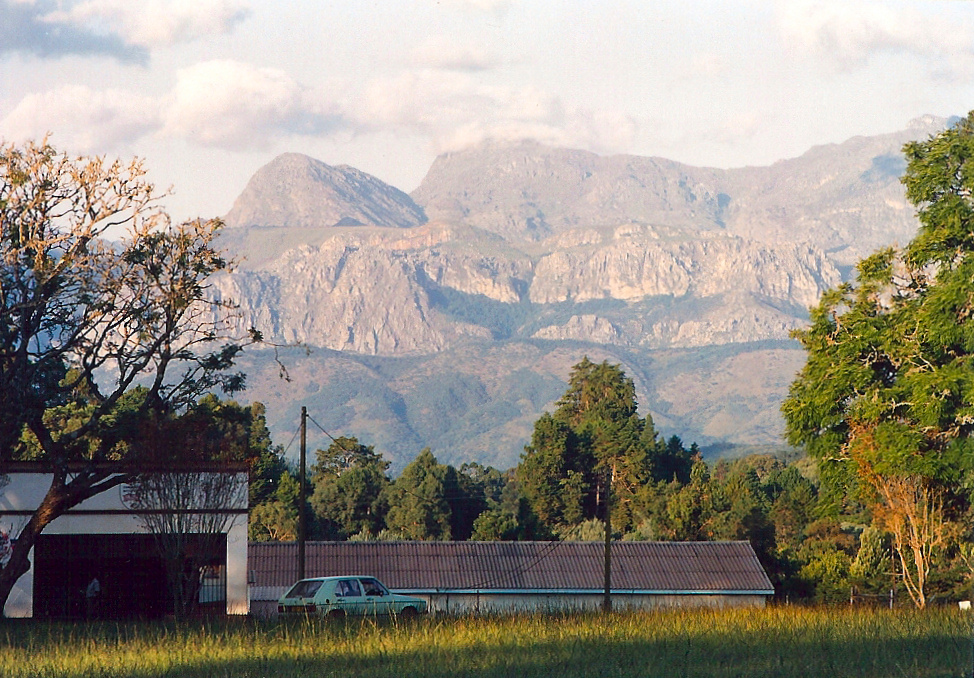
View of the National Park area from behind Chimanimani village stores

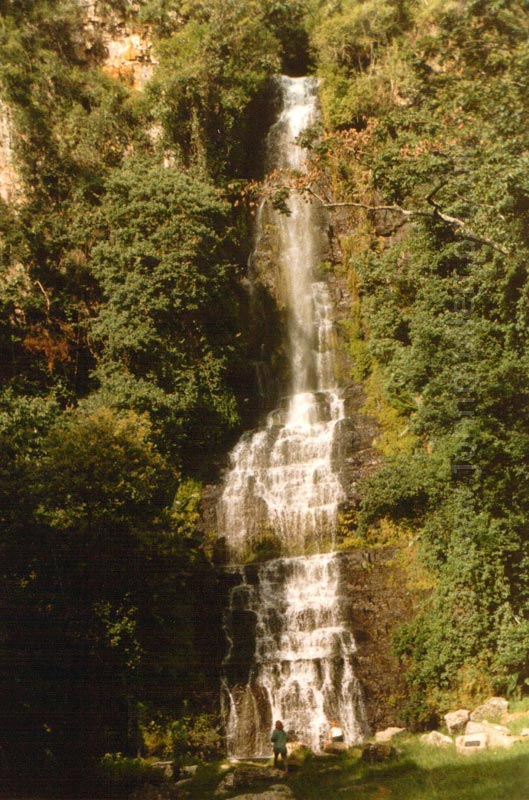
Bridal Veil Falls in the hills above Chimanimani village

== Resources ==
- Peter, Godwin (1996). Mukiwa: A White Boy in Africa. UK: Picador. ISBN 0-330-33983-4. Childhood of a white country doctor's son in the Chimanimani area in the 1960s, and beginnings of the Second Chimurenga (civil war).
