= Jonathan Moyo =

Zimbabwean politician (born 1957)

The Right Honourable Professor Jonathan Moyo MP

Minister of Higher and Tertiary Education
- In office 6 July 2017 – 15 November 2017
- President: Robert Mugabe
- Preceded by: Oppah Muchinguri
- Succeeded by: Amon Murwira

Minister of Information and Publicity
- In office September 2013 – 6 July 2015
- President: Robert Mugabe
- Preceded by: Webster Shamu
- Succeeded by: Christopher Mushohwe

Minister of Information and Publicity
- In office July 2000 – February 2005
- President: Robert Mugabe
- Succeeded by: Tichaona Jokonya

Member of Parliament for Tsholotsho North
- Incumbent
- Assumed office 10 June 2015
- Preceded by: Roselyn Nkomo

Member of Parliament for Tsholotsho
- In office 31 March 2009 – 2013
- Preceded by: Mtoliki Sibanda

Personal details
- Born: 12 January 1957 (age 69) Rhodesia and Nyasaland
- Party: ZANU-PF (expelled in 2017)
- Spouse: Beatrice Moyo
- Children: Tawanda; Lungile; Nokuthula; Zanele (deceased); Nomalanga

Jonathan Nathaniel Mlevu Moyo (born 12 January 1957) is a Zimbabwean politician who served in the government of Zimbabwe as Minister of Higher Education from 2015 to 2017. He was previously Minister of Information and Publicity from 2000 to 2005 and again from 2013 to 2015. He was elected to the House of Assembly of Zimbabwe as an independent candidate in 2005 and 2008. He is considered the core architect of the AIPPA and POSA restrictive legislation.

== Early life ==
He was raised by his mother, in absentia of the father. His father's name was Melusi Job Mlevu. His father was a politician and was allegedly murdered on 22 January 1983, during the Gukurahundi massacre. Jonathan Moyo attended his primary school at Mbiriya primary school in Tsholotsho North and his High school was in Mpopoma High school.

== Kenya ==
In 1993 he was program director for the Ford Foundation in Nairobi. He departed under a cloud after allegations that he had embezzled US$88,000 from the organisation. As of 2018 he was still under indictment in Kenya.

== South Africa ==
In January 1998 he moved to South Africa, to the University of Witwatersrand (WITS) to work on a project entitled The Future of the African Elite sponsored by the W. K. Kellogg Foundation. WITS later claimed that he had absconded with part of a 100 million rand research grant for the project. In October 2006 Moeletsi Mbeki, younger brother of former South African President Thabo Mbeki, and Witwatersrand University separately applied for an order to have Jonathan Moyo jailed the next time he visited South Africa.

== Zimbabwe ==
As ZANU-PF spokesman, he described the 2000 election, in which the Movement for Democratic Change (MDC) won a large minority of seats, as a "wake up call" and a "reality check for us".

=== Minister of Information and Publicity (2000–2005) ===
During his 2000 to 2005 tenure, he crafted and defended, helped by Patrick Chinamasa, the Broadcasting Services Act (BSA) (2001), the Zimbabwe Broadcasting Corporation (Commercialisation) Act (2003), the Access to Information and Protection of Privacy Act (AIPPA) (2002), the Public Order and Security Act (2002), and the Zimbabwe Broadcasting Corporation (Commercialisation) Act (2003). This led to widespread criticism that he was attacking freedom of speech.

When Moyo brought the AIPPA to parliament, the chairman of the Parliamentary Legal Committee, Dr Eddison Zvobgo, said, "I can say without equivocation that this Bill, in its original form, was the most calculated and determined assault on our liberties guaranteed by the Constitution, in the 20 years I served as Cabinet minister."

Since being expelled from government, he has denied and rejected outright that he was the architect of these laws.

As Minister of Information, Moyo fought personal and government battles with the media from July 2000 until 2005, when he was expelled from ZANU-PF.

He beamed with pleasure and satisfaction when Chief Justice Gubbay resigned after being threatened by Joseph Chinotimba and company. When the Daily News was shut down, he said "The Daily News is a victim of the rule of law which it had been preaching since 1999."

In the mere space of seven years, Moyo went from being a fervent critic of the government of Robert Mugabe to being its fiercest defender and then again to being one of its foremost critics, a fact that renders him a mystery to many Zimbabweans. Analysts and observers and ordinary people have labelled him an opportunist because of this puzzling behaviour, including George Charamba, his former friend and ally. He has said: "I have always been a critic of government policy. I was in government for more than five years. Before that I was a critic."

He is among many individuals not allowed to travel to the United States because the US government determined that he had worked to undermine democracy in Zimbabwe.

=== 2017 coup d'état and aftermath ===
On 19 November 2017, Moyo was expelled from ZANU–PF by the party's central committee. Other prominent G40 politicians, including Grace Mugabe, Saviour Kasukuwere, Patrick Zhuwao, Ignatius Chombo, Walter Mzembi, Shadreck Mashayamombe, Makhosini Hlongwane, Innocent Hamandishe, Samuel Undenge, and Sarah Mahoka were also expelled from the party. Moyo fled the country after his removal, and from his unknown location threatened bloodshed if Mugabe was not restored to power.

Even while a cabinet minister, Moyo was charged with corruption, and following his ouster investigations resumed. The main charges are that Moyo improperly used Zimdef (Zimbabwe Manpower Development Fund) funds for political patronage in his home district of Tsholotsho. In his defense, Moyo claimed that he did not convert the money for his own use, and that Tsholotsho, being one of the poorest Zimbabwean districts, deserved the largess.

== Tsholotsho ==
His philanthropy, including scholarship programs and support for sport over many years, has earned Moyo a respected place in Tsholotsho, his family area. This philanthropy increased during the days leading up to the March 2005 parliamentary election, a fact that critics feel made his win for the parliamentary seat in the area inevitable.

In the lead-up to the 2004 party meeting, he held an unofficial meeting in Tsholotsho, of Zanu-PF political heavyweights including six provincial party chairmen, Justice Minister Patrick Chinamasa, and a militant war veterans' leader, Joseph Chinotimba. It was aimed at contesting one of the two vice-presidential seats after the recent death of Simon Muzenda on 20 September 2003, seen as a stepping stone to the presidency in light of Mugabe's presumed retirement in 2008.

He was heavily censured at the later Zanu-PF meeting, with other attendees. Joyce Mujuru won the vice-presidency at the party meeting.

The subsequent decision to set aside the Tsholotsho seat in the 2005 parliamentary election for female candidates was widely interpreted as punishing those who organised the unauthorised meeting, and in particular Moyo.

In February 2005 Moyo registered to run as an independent for the seat. Doing so earned the wrath of Mugabe, who expelled him from the party and the cabinet. He won the seat in the elections, held on 31 March.

Standing again as an independent, Moyo was re-elected to the House of Assembly from Tsholotsho North constituency in the March 2008 parliamentary election. He received 3,532 votes, defeating MDC candidate Mgezelwa Ncube, who received 3,305 votes, as well as Zanu-PF candidate Alice Dube, who received 2,085 votes. He was the first independent candidate in Zimbabwe to ever win re-election. The mainstream MDC did not field a candidate in this constituency on the understanding that Moyo's victory would be good in the fight to remove Mugabe from power. However, no sooner had Moyo won did he start taking potshots at the MDC and openly defending and supporting Mugabe in newspaper articles. Some say he was angling for a cabinet position, something that did not happen.

Moyo was defeated in Tsholotsho North constituency by the MDC-T's Roselene Nkomo in elections which took place on 31 July 2013. Moyo tried to force through a recount of the votes but his attempt was blocked when Bulawayo High Court judge Justice Lawrence Kamocha barred the Zimbabwe Electoral Commission (ZEC) from conducting a vote recount in the constituency without an order of such effect from the Electoral Court and finalisation of the application of review. Despite Moyo's defeat, Mugabe appointed him as Minister of Information on 10 September 2013.

Mugabe fiercely criticised Moyo in June 2014, saying that Moyo was "plant[ing] seeds of division" in ZANU-PF by attacking his opponents within the party through the media. According to Mugabe, Moyo had appointed newspaper editors sympathetic to the opposition. Mugabe stressed that party members should not be enemies and differences "should not make you want to attack them in the paper".

After two years as Minister of Information, and after winning a by-election in Bulawayo on 6 June 2015, Moyo was moved to the post of Minister of Higher and Tertiary Education on 6 July 2015. In that position he had control over Zimdef funds which he used for various purposes in Tsholotsho including funding Zanu PF political rallies and the purchase of bicycles that he distributed to political workers.

== Education ==
Moyo attended the University of Zimbabwe and the University of Southern California. He holds a Bachelors (BSc) degree and a PhD degree in Public Policy and a master's degree in Public Administration.

== Appointments ==
- Lecturer – Department of Political and Administrative Studies, University of Zimbabwe (1988–1993)
- Programme Officer – Ford Foundation (1993–1997)
- Visiting Professor – University of Witwatersrand (January 1998 – July 2000)
- Spokesman – Constitutional Commission, Government of Zimbabwe (1999–2000)
- General Election Campaign Manager – Zimbabwe African National Union – Patriotic Front (2000)
- Minister of Information – Government of Zimbabwe (July 2000 – February 2005)
- Member – Central Committee, Zimbabwe African National Union – Patriotic Front (July 2000 – December 2004)
- Independent MP for Tsholotsho after defeating the ruling ZANU(PF) and the opposition MDC in the March 2005 parliamentary elections; re-elected as Independent MP in 2008
- Member of ZANU PF (2011 – 2017)
- Minister of Information – Government of Zimbabwe (September 2013 – July 2015)
- Minister of Higher and Tertiary Education, Science and Technology Development – Government of Zimbabwe (July 2015 – November 2017)

== Criticism ==
Moyo was criticised and ridiculed for his activities during the time he was Minister of Information and Publicity.

In 2005, journalist and agronomist Asher Tarivona Mutsengi, then a student leader at Solusi University, criticised Moyo saying "... he will go down in the annals of history as a minister who lacked foresight and for pouring vitriol against his perceived opponents, his shopping spree in South Africa of scarce foodstuffs, causing unemployment to a multitude of journalists and a penchant for uncivilized propaganda." He went on to say, "... my final analysis is that he is heading for the precipice and his political prospects even if he wins the Tsholotsho seat that he is vying for as an independent are drab. He might be a spin-doctor and intelligent as some claim, but I don't subscribe to that myself."

Innocent Madawo, a Zimbabwean journalist and columnist for the Toronto Sun newspaper said in an interview about Moyo, "If it were not for Jonathan Moyo I would not be here and I am sure I am not the only one who feels like this. Even those who may have been showered with favours by the good professor, I know for certain that they too were burdened by his attentions and demands and right now, a lot are embarrassed that they ever knew him."

=== Columnist ===
In recent times since parting ways with Mugabe, Jonathan Moyo has written for some online news publications critical of Mugabe's government. Ironically, most of the editors of these publications are victims of media laws supported or sponsored by Moyo during his days as information minister. He seems to have been embraced and given a platform to express his anger at the government of Mugabe.

== Wikileaks lawsuit ==
In May 2011, Moyo sued the Daily News for US$60,000 for reprinting former articles about his expulsion from Zanu-PF in 2005. He rejoined later. In September he sued the paper again, this time for a 6 September report which cited a 2007 US diplomatic cable in which Moyo voiced support for sanctions against President Robert Mugabe. In a follow-up article the next day it reported that Moyo had suggested which senior members of the party should be targeted by sanctions.

== Quotes ==
=== General ===
"Perennial wisdom from divine revelation and human experience dictates that all earthly things great or small, beautiful or ugly, good or bad, sad or happy, foolish or wise must finally come to an end. It is from this sobering reality that the end of executive rule has finally come for Robert Mugabe who has had his better days after a quarter of a century in power."

=== War with the media ===
"The Daily News is a victim of the rule of law which it had been preaching since 1999." He said, celebrating and beaming at the demise of the popular Daily News.

=== War at home ===
"If good governance means that black people should forever live as servants and poor and as inferior citizens to white people, we don't accept it" Defending the land reform program.

"Good Riddance" he said after Chief Justice Anthony Gubbay, 68, signed an agreement to go on leave immediately and to retire formally on 1 July 2001 following threats from war veterans led by Joseph Chinotimba.

"We have to secure the gains of the Third Chimurenga in legal terms and Government is considering a number of options. The so-called successful white farmers were made by successive colonial governments. But given the level of the support they enjoyed and the vast tracts of land they commanded, an inescapable conclusion is that they were an inefficient lot. Much of commercial farmland was under-utilised. Moving forward means crafting legislation that consolidates and puts a final seal of legality to the gains we have made through the fast-track programme. We are aware that white commercial farmers who used to be on the land have refused to surrender title deeds to Government."

=== War with foreigners ===
"Our problem with Britain and Australia is over the land we took over from their white kith and kin to redistribute to the indigenous black people of this country. ..." Explaining why relations with Britain had become strained.

"We were under pressure from foreigners who claimed that they were Zimbabweans, when they were actually enemies," Defending the government's decision not to award broadcasting licenses to foreign companies.

"I have always had a nagging feeling that for all their propensity for liberal values and civilised norms, these people (South Africans) are dirty. In fact they are filthy and recklessly uncouth. Now the evidence is there for any decent person to see" Justifying his shopping spree in South Africa, when people in Zimbabwe were starving.

"He needs to be told that Zimbabwe will never be a colony again, never" Telling Tony Blair not to interfere in Zimbabwe during the days leading up to the 2002 presidential elections.
