= Jacob Ngarivhume =

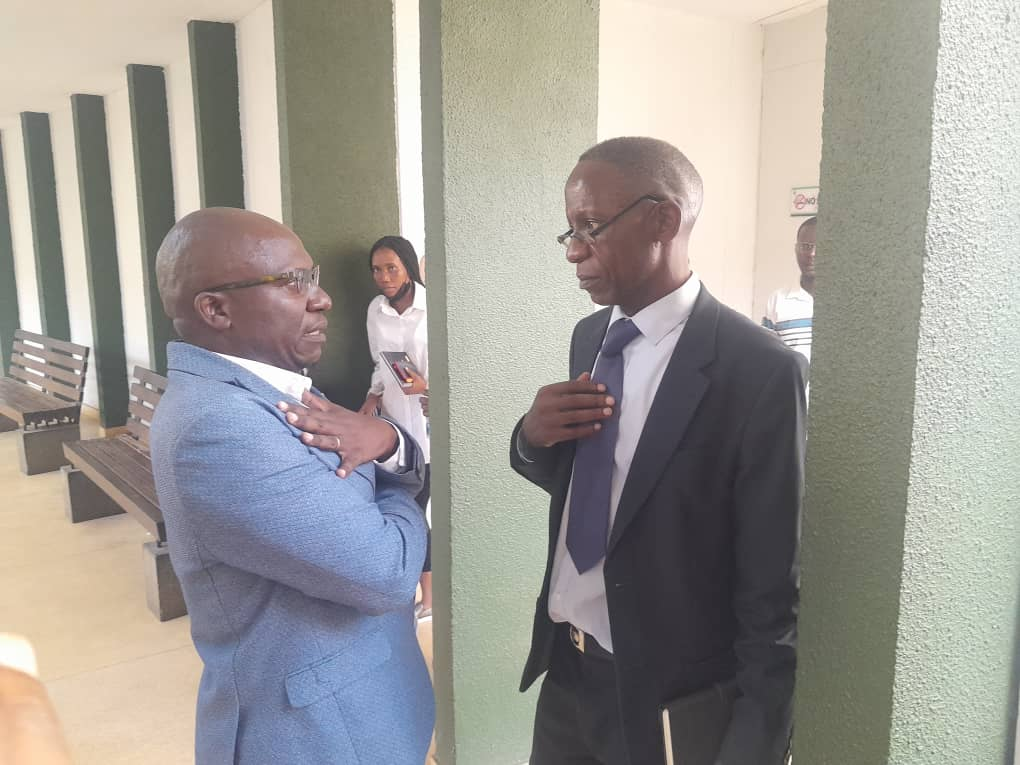
Jacob Ngarivhume (left) and his attorney

Jacob Ngarivhume is a politician who leads a christian-based opposition party called Transform Zimbabwe. He seeks to diversify the political sphere of Zimbabwe by fostering leaders from varying backgrounds.

Ngarivhume's voice in the Zimbabwean political sphere is one that is very critical of the ZANU-PF party. This dissent is voiced mostly through social media, namely Twitter. It was on this platform that he pushed for the resignation of every member in the ZANU-PF party, going as far to say that the president of the ZANU-PF party should be imprisoned. Additionally, Ngarivhume uses social media to further his goal of fostering diverse opinions in the modern political sphere of Zimbabwe by curating spaces for political groups and civil societies to once their dissent as well as push them to protest.

== Early life and education ==
Ngarivhume was born on February 20, 1978 in Chimanimani. His father moved him and his family shortly after his birth in Bikta in Masingo Province where he would spend many of his formative years practicing the Christian faith at Johane Marange Apostolic Church. He went to the University of Zimbabwe to pursue degrees in mathematics and statistics. During his time at the university, he would join the Apostolic Faith Mission Church, where he is currently a pastor. In addition, he was the branch chairman for MDC as well as a member of the student representative council. After college, Ngarivhume would go on to work as leading consultant at not only his own research institutes, but also other consortiums around the world.

Ngarivhume is married to Nyashadzashe Mafuru Ngarivhume, the two of them have three children.

== Political career and advocacy ==
In 2009, Ngarivhume founded and was chairperson of the grassroots civic organization Voice for Democracy. The group's goal was to advocate for justice and democracy.

Ngarivhume was chairperson of Prayer Network Zimbabwe, a Christian organization that was founded in 2010 that aimed to pray for the complete transformation of the Zimbabwean country.

ZANU-PF Party Flag

In 2013, Ngarivhume founded the Transform Zimbabwe party. The name and goal of the party were inspired by the goals of Prayer Network Zimbabwe, and delegates of Prayer Network joined Ngarivhume in the founding of Transform Zimbabwe.

Ngarivhume, alongside a Zimbabwean journalist Hopewell Chin'ono, openly questioned the choices of the ZANU-PF government, as well as organized a protest over social media using Twitter in 2020, during the COVID-19 pandemic. The protest, which Ngarivhume dubbed "July 31 Movement", was scheduled for July 31 of that year, but 11 days before the protest, Ngarivhume was arrested by the Zimbabwean government for inciting an unlawful overthrow attempt of the government. The tweet Ngarivhume posted read: "31 July is a day for your voices to be heard. Zimbabwe has been plundered by selfish, self- serving politicians who do not care how many lives they destroy…Our brothers and sisters in the police and army have been weaponized against us for too long now. We must challenge them now to consider the facts and see that those in power have committed serious crimes against Zimbabwe…31 July is not a political agenda but a people agenda." Ngarivhume and Chin'ono's arrests sparked the hashtag #ZimbabweanLivesMatter, which was the Zimbabwean public disagreeing with the treatment of voices of dissent in Zimbabwe's political sphere.

Ngarivhume has centered most of his political discourse around calling attention to the ignorance of human rights concerns by the majority ZANU-PF party as well as the party's weakness when it comes to upholding democracy. Transform Zimbabwe is a member of the Movement for Democratic Change Alliance (MDC-A), another political party that stands in opposition to the ZANU-PF party, that includes seven other Zimbabwean political groups.

== Arrests ==
Within the years of 2014-2015, Ngarivhume was arrested multiple times. There was an arrest made of him and 12 members of the Transform Zimbabwe party in July of 2014 under POSA (Public Order and Security Act), alleging that they had hosted illegal meetings in Harare and Gweru. They were released after being detained for four days. Under similar charges Ngarivhume was arrested again that year. Following this arrest, 13 of his supporters, alongside his wife, protested outside of the courtroom against his arrest. Immediately after leaving the court room, Ngarivhume, his supporters, and his wife were all arrested form disturbing public order. In August of 2014, Ngarivhume would be arrested again in Nyanga after attending a church session in which he delivered a politically charged sermon.

After being arrested for organizing the July 31 Movement protest in 2020, Ngarivhume was arrested and convicted by Feresi Chakanyuka, the Harare Magistrate, on April 28, 2023. He was sentenced to four years in prison, with one year suspended without any option of bail. Ngarivhume appealed to the court, stating that he was falsely convicted, however due to High Court judge justice Pisirayi Kwenda being absent to preside over the case, the hearing was delayed. In December of 2023, eight months into his prison sentence, High Court judges Pisirayi Kwenda and Fatima Maxwell would rule that Ngarivhume was falsely convicted due to there being no evidence provided to prove that the account belonged to him.

On August 2, 2024, Ngarivhume was arrested and held in Chikurubi Maximum Security Prison in the days leading up to the Southern African Development Committee (SADC) heads of state summit, set to take place on the 17th of August in Harare. Ngarivhume was part of a group of 100 activists that the Zimbabwean state claimed were a threat to the safety of the SADC. Ngarivhume was accused of disorderly conduct in a public space, as well as participating in an illegal gathering intending to promote public violence. Ngarivhume was incarcerated 82 days before his trial, and wasn't granted bail had it ruled by Justice Emilia Muchawa that he be freed on $100 USD bail, with the conditions that he surrender his passport and is banned from making posts on social media. Both Hopewell Chin'ono and Founder of the Zimbabwe Rainbow Coalition Job Sikhala spoke out against his arrest, stating that Ngarivhume was innocent and deserving of bail.
