= Anglo-Portuguese Treaty of 1891 =

1891 treaty between the United Kingdom and Portugal

The Anglo-Portuguese Treaty of 1891 was an agreement between the United Kingdom and Portugal which fixed the boundaries between the British Central Africa Protectorate, (now Malawi) and the territories administered by the British South Africa Company in Mashonaland and Matabeleland (now parts of Zimbabwe) and North-Western Rhodesia (now part of Zambia) and Portuguese Mozambique, and also between the British South Africa Company administered territories of North-Eastern Rhodesia (now in Zambia), and Portuguese Angola.

This treaty brought to an end over 20 years of increasing disagreement over conflicting territorial claims in the eastern part of Central Africa, where Portugal had long-standing claims based on prior discovery and exploration but where British citizens set up missions and embryonic trading concerns in the Shire Highlands in what is now Malawi from the 1860s. These disagreements were increased in the 1870s and 1880s, firstly by a dispute over a British claim to part of Delagoa Bay and by the failure of bilateral negotiations between the two countries over the boundaries of Portuguese territories and secondly as a result of the Berlin Conference of 1884–85, which set-out the doctrine of effective occupation. After the Berlin Conference, Portugal tried to establish a zone of effective occupation linking its colonies in Angola and Mozambique through expeditions making treaties that would establish protectorates over local peoples and obtaining recognition from other European powers. The relative success of these Portuguese efforts alarmed the British government of Lord Salisbury, which was also under pressure from missionaries in the Shire Highlands, and also Cecil Rhodes, who founded the British South Africa Company in 1888 with the aim of controlling as much of south-central Africa as it could. For these reasons, and in response to a minor armed conflict in the Shire Highlands, Lord Salisbury issued the 1890 British Ultimatum which required Portugal to evacuate the areas in dispute. Lord Salisbury refused the Portuguese request for arbitration and, after an abortive attempt to fix the boundaries of their respective territories in 1890, the Anglo-Portuguese Treaty of 1891 was accepted by Portugal under duress.

== Origins of the Anglo-Portuguese conflict ==
At the start of the 19th century, effective Portuguese governance in Africa south of the equator was limited, in Portuguese Mozambique to the Island of Mozambique and several other coastal trading as far south as Delagoa Bay, and in Portuguese Angola to Luanda and Benguela and a few outposts, the most northerly of which was Ambriz Portugal had occupied the coast of Mozambique from the 16th century, and later initiated the Prazo system of large leased estates under nominal Portuguese rule in the Zambezi valley. By the end of the 18th century, the valleys of the Zambezi and lower Shire River were controlled by four families that claimed to be Portuguese but which were virtually independent, and from 1853 the Portuguese government embarked on a series of military campaigns to bring these under its effective control. In the second half of the 19th century, various European powers had an increasing interest in Africa. The first challenge to Portugal's wider claims came from the Transvaal Republic, which in 1868 claimed an outlet to the Indian Ocean at Delagoa Bay. Although in 1869 Portugal and the Transvaal reached agreement on a border under which all of Delagoa Bay was Portuguese, Britain then lodged a claim to the southern part of that bay. This claim was rejected after arbitration by President MacMahon. His award made in 1875 upheld the border agreed in 1869. A second challenge came from the foundation of a German colony at Angra Pequena, now known as Lüderitz, in Namibia in 1883. Although there was no Portuguese presence there, Portugal had claimed it on the basis of discovery.

During the 1850s, the areas south of Lake Nyasa (now Lake Malawi) and west of the lake were explored by David Livingstone, and several Church of England and Presbyterian missions were established in the Shire Highlands in the 1860s and 1870s. In 1878 the African Lakes Company was established by businessmen with links to the Presbyterian missions. Their aim was to set up a trading company that would work in close co-operation with the missions to combat the slave trade by introducing legitimate trade and to develop European influence in the area. A small mission and trading settlement was established at Blantyre in 1876.

Portugal attempted to secure its position in Africa through the expeditions of Alexandre de Serpa Pinto first to the eastern Zambezi in 1869, then to the Congo and upper Zambezi from Angola in 1876 and lastly in 1877–79 crossing Africa from Angola, with the intention of claiming the area between Mozambique and Angola. In addition to these expeditions, Portugal attempted bi-lateral negotiations with Britain and in 1879, as part of talks on a treaty on freedom of navigation on the Congo and Zambezi rivers and the development of trade in those river basins, the Portuguese government made a formal claim to the area south and east of the Ruo River (which forms the present south-eastern border of Malawi). The 1879 treaty was never ratified, and in 1882 Portugal occupied the lower Shire River valley as far as the Ruo and again asked the British government to accept this territorial claim. Further bi-lateral negotiations, led to a draft treaty in February 1884, which would have included British recognition of Portuguese sovereignty over the mouth of the Congo in exchange for freedom of navigation on the Congo and Zambezi rivers but the opening of the Berlin Conference of 1884–85 ended these discussions, which could have led to British recognition of Portuguese sovereignty stretching across the continent. Portugal's efforts to establish this corridor of influence between Angola and Mozambique were hampered by one of the articles in the General Act of the Berlin Conference requiring effective occupation of areas claimed rather than historical claims based on discovery or claims based on exploration as used by Portugal.

To establish further Portuguese claims, Serpa Pinto was appointed as its consul in Zanzibar in 1884, with a mission to explore the region between Lake Nyasa and the coast from the Zambezi to the Rovuma River and secure the allegiance if the chiefs in that area. His expedition reached Lake Nyasa and the Shire Highlands, but failed make any treaties of protection with the chiefs in territories west of the lake. At the northwest end of Lake Nyasa around Karonga, the African Lakes Company made, or claimed to have made, treaties with local chiefs between 1884 and 1886. Its ambition was to become a Chartered company and control the route from the Lake along the Shire River. Any ambition it may have had to control the Shire Highlands was given up in 1886, following protests from local missionaries that it could not police this area effectively.

== Background to the 1890 British Ultimatum ==
Despite the outcome of the Berlin Conference, the idea of a trans-African Portuguese zone was not abandoned. In 1885, the Portuguese Foreign Minister prepared what became known as the Rose Coloured Map representing a claim stretching from the Atlantic to the Indian Ocean. Portugal also signed treaties with France and Germany in 1886. The French treaty "noted" the Rose Coloured Map, and the German treaty noted Portugal's claim to territory along the course of the Zambezi linking Angola and Mozambique. The act of "noting" Portuguese claims did not amount to accepting them, only that Portugal had made them. In 1887, the British Minister in Lisbon proposed that the Zambezi should be recognised as the northern limit of British influence, which would have left the Scottish missionaries in the Shire Highlands within the Portuguese zone and created a band of Portuguese territory linking Angola and Mozambique. This was rejected by Portugal because the Shire Highlands and their missions could at that time only be accessed through coastal areas acknowledged as Portuguese, and because the proposal would involve giving up the southern and more valuable half of the transcontinental zone of the Rose Coloured Map for little in return. However, by 1889 the Portuguese government felt less confident and its Foreign Minister, Barros Gomez proposed to the British government that it was willing to abandon its claim to a zone linking Angola and Mozambique in exchange for recognition of its claim to the Shire Highlands. This time, it was the British government that rejected the proposal, firstly because of the opposition of those supporting the Scottish missions, and secondly, because the Chinde River entrance to the Zambezi had been discovered in April 1889. As the Zambezi could now be directly entered by ocean-going shops, it and its tributary the Shire River could be regarded as an international waterway giving access to the Shire Highlands.

North of the Zambezi, the Portuguese claims, were opposed both by the African Lakes Company and the missionaries. To the south, the main opposition to Portuguese claims came from Cecil Rhodes, whose British South Africa Company was founded in 1888. As late as 1888, the British Foreign Office declined to offer protection to the tiny British settlements in the Shire Highlands. However, it did not accept an expansion of Portuguese influence, and in 1889 it appointed Henry Hamilton Johnston as British consul to Mozambique and the Interior, and instructed him to report on the extent of Portuguese rule in the Zambezi and Shire valleys. He was also to make conditional treaties with local rulers outside Portuguese control. These conditional treaties did not establish a British protectorate, but prevented the rulers from accepting protection from another state.

In 1888, the Portuguese government instructed its representatives in Mozambique to make treaties of protection with the Yao chiefs southeast of Lake Nyasa and in the Shire Highlands. Two expeditions were organised, one under Antonio Cardoso, a former governor of Quelimane, set off in November 1888 for Lake Nyasa. The second expedition under Serpa Pinto, (now governor of Mozambique) moved up the Shire valley. Between them, these two expeditions made over 20 treaties with chiefs in what is now Malawi. The expedition led by Pinto was well armed, partly in response to a request from the Portuguese resident on the lower Shire for help in resolving disturbances caused by the Makololo chiefs. The Makololo had been brought into the area by David Livingstone as part of his Zambezi expedition, and remained on the Shire north and west of the Ruo river when it ended in 1864. They claimed to be outside Portuguese control, and asked for British assistance to remain independent. Serpa Pinto met Johnston in August 1889 east of the Ruo, when Johnston advised him not to cross the river into the Shire Highlands.

However, it is likely that members of the British community in the Shire Highlands encouraged the Makololo to attack Serpa Pinto's camp, which led to a minor battle between Pinto's Portuguese troops and the Makololo on 8 November 1889 near the Shire river. Although Serpa Pinto had previously acted with caution, he now crossed the Ruo into what is now Malawi. Serpa Pinto occupied much of Makololo territory after this minor clash, at which Johnston's vice-consul, John Buchanan, accused Portugal of ignoring British interests in this area and declared a British protectorate over the Shire Highlands in December 1889, despite contrary instructions. Shortly after this, Johnston himself declared a further protectorate over the area to the west of Lake Nyasa, also contrary to his instructions, although both protectorates were later endorsed by the Foreign Office. These actions formed the background to an Anglo-Portuguese Crisis in which a British refusal of arbitration was followed by the 1890 British Ultimatum.

== The 1890 British Ultimatum ==
The Ultimatum refers to a memorandum sent to the Portuguese Government by Lord Salisbury on 11 January 1890 in which he demanded the withdrawal of the Portuguese troops from Mashonaland and Matabeleland (now Zimbabwe) and the area between the Shire river north of the Ruo and Lake Nyasa (including all the Shire Highlands), where Portuguese and British interests in Africa overlapped. It meant that Britain was now claiming sovereignty over territories, some of which had been claimed by Portugal for centuries. There was no dispute regarding the borders of Angola, as neither country had effectively occupied any part of the sparsely populated border area.

The Ultimatum caused violent anti-British sentiments in Portugal and demonstrations leading to riots. The Portuguese Republicans used it as an excuse to attack the government, and riots eventually led to a Republican coup d'état in Porto in January 1891, when the first attempt at a treaty to resolve the dispute was published. Although much attention has been paid to the Portuguese reaction to the Ultimatum, less has been given to the attitude of the British government in using tactics that could have led to war, and it has been plausibly argued that Lord Salisbury, whose government was diplomatically isolated, feared being humiliated by a Portuguese success. The British government had also granted a Royal Charter to Rhodes' British South Africa Company in October 1889, before it received news of Serpa Pinto's skirmish with the Makololo. This allowed the company to claim Mashonaland and also Manicaland and the Zambezi valley above Zumbo. Only Portugal had any claim to effective occupation of any part of the latter two areas.

== The 1891 Treaty ==
Although the Ultimatum required Portugal to cease from activity in the disputed areas, there was no similar restriction on further British occupation there. Agents for Rhodes were active in Mashonaland and Manicaland and in what is now eastern Zambia, and John Buchanan asserted British rule in more of the Shire Highlands. There were armed clashes between Rhodes' men and Portuguese troops who were already in occupation in Manicaland in 1890 and 1891, which only ceased when areas that had been allocated to Portugal in the unratified 1890 treaty were reassigned to Rhodes' British South Africa Company in the 1891 treaty, with Portugal being given more land in the Zambezi valley in compensation for this loss.

The General Act of the Berlin Conference required disputes to go to arbitration and issuing the Ultimatum was a breach of this rule. After the Ultimatum Portugal asked for arbitration, but because the 1875 Delagoa Bay arbitration had been in favour of Portugal, Lord Salisbury refused and demanded a bi-lateral treaty. Talks started in Lisbon in April 1890, and in May the Portuguese delegation proposed joint administration of the disputed area between Angola and Mozambique. The British government refused this, and drafted a treaty that imposed boundaries that were generally favourable to Britain.

These proposals were included in an agreement over Portuguese African borders signed on 20 August 1890 but never ratified by the Portuguese Parliament. When the treaty was presented to that parliament on 30 August, it led to a wave of protests and the downfall of the Portuguese government. Not only was it never ratified by the Portuguese Parliament, but Cecil Rhodes, whose plans of expansion it affected, also opposed this treaty. A new treaty was negotiated which gave Portugal more territory in the Zambezi valley than the 1890 treaty, but what is now the Manicaland Province of Zimbabwe passed from Portuguese to British control. This treaty, which also fixed the borders of Angola, was signed in Lisbon on 11 June 1891, and in addition to defining boundaries allowed freedom of navigation on the Zambezi and Shire rivers and allowed Britain to lease land for a port at Chinde at the mouth of the Zambezi.

The other boundaries of the Central Africa Protectorate were also agreed around this time. The northern border was fixed at the Songwe River as part of an Anglo-German Convention in 1890. Its western border with Northern Rhodesia was fixed in 1891 at the drainage divide between Lake Malawi and the Luangwa River by agreement with the British South Africa Company, which governed what is today Zambia under Royal Charter until 1924.

== 1897 Boundary Arbitration ==
Differing interpretations of the treaty language by the governments of the UK and Portugal revived a dispute over the boundary through the Manica Plateau, which lies between the Zambezi and Save rivers. The boundary dispute was arbitrated by Paolo Onorato Vigliani, an assistant to the King of Italy. The arbitration was completed on 30 January 1897, finally establishing the international boundary between the British colony of Southern Rhodesia and Portugal's Mozambique colony.

== See also ==
- British Central Africa Protectorate
- Nyasaland
- Portuguese Mozambique
- Berlin Conference
- Cecil Rhodes
- British South Africa Company
- Treaty of Windsor (1899)
- Anglo-Portuguese Treaty of 1878

== Sources ==
- M Newitt, (1995). A History of Mozambique, London, Hurst & Co. ISBN 1-85065-172-8.
- R Oliver and A Atmore, (1986). The African Middle Ages, 1400–1800, Cambridge University Press. ISBN 0-521-29894-6.
- M Newitt, (1969). The Portuguese on the Zambezi: Am Historical Interpretation of the Prazo system, Journal of African History Vol X, No 1.
- H. Livermore (1992), Consul Crawfurd and the Anglo-Portuguese Crisis of 1890 Portuguese Studies, Vol. 8.
- J G Pike, (1969). Malawi: A Political and Economic History, London, Pall Mall Press.
- C E Nowell, (1947). Portugal and the Partition of Africa, The Journal of Modern History, Vol. 19, No. 1.
- J McCraken, (2012). A History of Malawi, 1859–1966, Woodbridge, James Currey. ISBN 978-1-84701-050-6
- Teresa Pinto Coelho, (2006). Lord Salisbury's 1890 Ultimatum to Portugal and Anglo-Portuguese Relations, p. 2. http://www.mod-langs.ox.ac.uk/files/windsor/6_pintocoelho.pdf
- R I Rotberg, (1965). The Rise of Nationalism in Central Africa: The Making of Malawi and Zambia, 1873–1964, Cambridge (Mass), Harvard University Press.
- F Axelson, (1967). Portugal and the Scramble for Africa, Johannesburg, Witwatersrand University Press.
