= Treaty of Windsor =

Several treaties are named Treaty of Windsor. The most famous is the treaty of 1386 between England and Portugal, the world's oldest recorded allegiance between two nations.

- Treaty of Windsor (1175) between England and Ireland
- Treaty of Windsor (1386) between England and Portugal
- Treaty of Windsor (1522) between England and the Holy Roman Empire
- Treaty of Windsor (1899) between England and Portugal
