= Cashel South African Air Force Alouette crash =

1975 helicopter crash

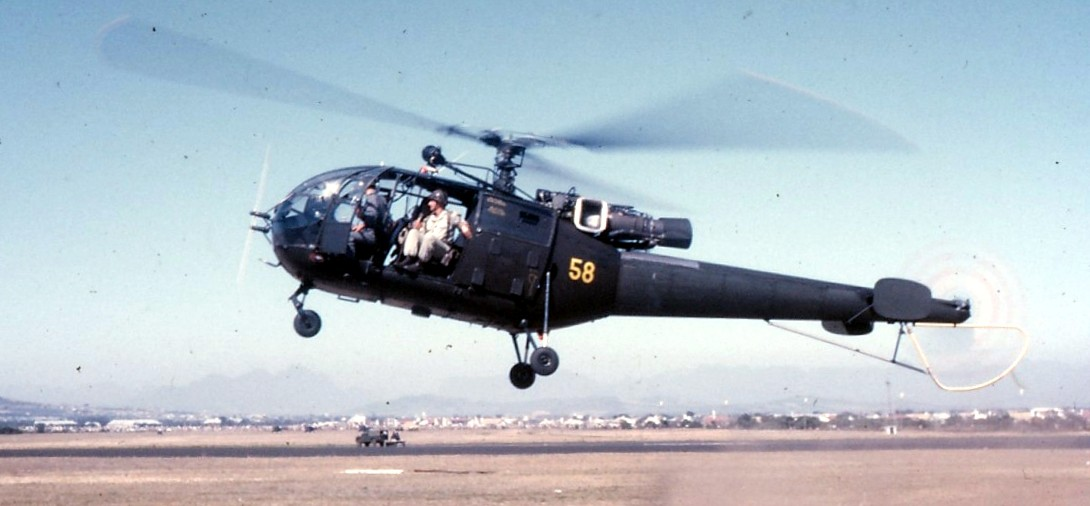
- An Aerospatiale SA-316 Alouette III of the SAAF, 1970s.

Accident
- Date: 23 December 1975
- Summary: Crashed after flying into a hawser cable
- Site: Cashel, Rhodesia

Aircraft
- Aircraft type: Aérospatiale Alouette III helicopter
- Operator: South African Air Force
- Flight origin: Umtali
- Destination: Melsetter
- Occupants: 6
- Crew: 6
- Fatalities: 5
- Injuries: 1
- Survivors: 1

On 23 December 1975, an Aérospatiale Alouette III helicopter of the South African Air Force carrying a two-man crew and four Rhodesian Army officers crashed near Cashel in Rhodesia after it collided with a hawser cable mid-flight. The accident dealt a severe blow to the Rhodesian Security Forces, then fighting bitterly against ZANLA and ZIPRA insurgents in the Rhodesian Bush War, for the officers involved were some of its best and would prove difficult to replace.

== Accident ==
An Alouette III helicopter of the South African Air Force (SAAF) crewed by an SAAF pilot, Air Sub-Lieutenant Johannes van Rensberg, and a South African Air Force (SAF) flight technician, Sergeant Pieter van Rensberg, was flying from Umtali to Melsetter with four senior Rhodesian Army officers as passengers. These were Major General John Shaw, Colonel David Parker, Captain John Lamb and Captain Ian Robinson. The Alouette III was one of several on loan to Rhodesia to assist in counter-insurgency operations during the Bush War.

Flying at low altitude in accordance with procedure and en route to troops stationed on the border for a Christmas visit, the helicopter flew into a rusty, long-forgotten hawser cable at around 10 a.m. on Shinda Orchards Farm near Cashel, just south of Umtali and 3 km from the Mozambican border. The cable had years before been used to pass logs down a steep slope and was unmarked on any maps. The airframe began to break up as the helicopter spun out of control and crashed. All on board were killed except for the pilot, who was seriously injured, losing one of his legs. He was fitted with an artificial leg and got the nickname, Peg-a-Leg van Rensburg.

A combined funeral was held six days later, on 30 December, at St. Mary's Anglican Cathedral in Salisbury. A joint honour guard, unusual due to the rarity of four officers from four different regiments dying alongside one another, was provided by the Rhodesian Light Infantry (RLI) and the Rhodesian African Rifles (RAR). It was the largest Security Forces funeral ever held in Rhodesia, with a huge officer contingent taking part in the funeral procession. Behind the honour guard and the men's families, the top brass – army commander Lieutenant General Peter Walls, Minister of Defence and Minister of Foreign Affairs P. K. van der Byl, Commissioner Peter Sherren of the British South Africa Police (BSAP), Air Marshal Mick McLaren of the RhAF and the South African military attaché, Brigadier L. L. Gordon – led this slow march.

Sergeant Pieter van Rensburg body was flown to South Africa where he was buried on 28 December, with full military honors in the Voortrekker Heights cemetery in Pretoria. The service was held in the Zwartkops Airforce chapel.

== Impact ==
Shaw was the Rhodesian Army's Chief of Staff and thus second-in-command to Walls. Almost a month earlier, on 30 November, Parker had ended his tenure as commanding officer of the RLI whereupon he was promoted from Lieutenant-Colonel to the rank of Colonel. Robertson was the acting commanding officer of 5 Independent Company the Rhodesia Regiment, and Lamb served in the headquarters of 3 Brigade the RAR.

The historians Hannes Wessels and P. J. H. Petter-Bowyer agree that the deaths of the Rhodesian officers, in particular the death of Parker, affected the course of the Bush War in the guerrillas' favour: Shaw was Rhodesia's "next Army Commander", says Petter-Bowyer, and Parker "its finest field commander". The Colonel was "earmarked for bigger things", Wessels writes, "... his loss was a considerable blow to the Rhodesian war effort."

Likewise, Peter Godwin and Ian Hancock describe Shaw as a "controversial figure within Army circles, disliked—by some—for his drinking and his manners" but nevertheless Walls' "probable successor". They go on to say "the loss of Parker and Lamb, on the other hand, was generally regarded as a grievous blow."

== See also ==
- 1994 Mull of Kintyre Chinook crash
