= Chimanimani =

Chimanimani Melsetter
- Town
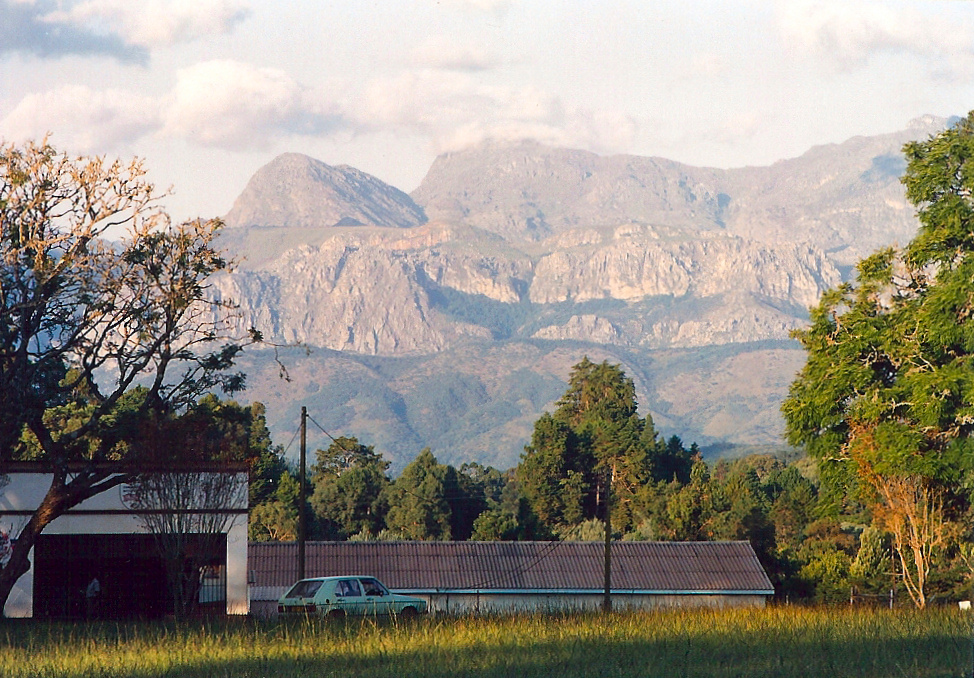
- View of the Chimanimani Mountains as seen from the town

- Location of Chimanimani in Zimbabwe
- Coordinates: 19°48′00″S 32°51′36″E
- Country: Zimbabwe
- Melsetter: 1892
- Chimanimani: 1982
- Elevation: 1,470 m (4,820 ft)

Population (2012 Census)
  - Total: 6,815
- Time zone: UTC+2 (CAT)
- Climate: Cwb
- Website: Homepage
- Dialling code: 26 (026 from within Zimbabwe)

Chimanimani, originally known as Melsetter, is a town in Zimbabwe.

== Location ==
Chimanimani is a village located in Manicaland Province, in south-eastern Zimbabwe, close to the border with Mozambique. The village lies about 120 kilometres (75 mi), by road, south of Mutare, the location of the provincial headquarters. Its location lies approximately 365 kilometres (227 mi), by road, southeast of Harare, the capital of Zimbabwe and the largest city in that country. The coordinates of the village of Chimanimani are: 19° 48' 0.00"S, 32° 51' 36.00"E (Latitude:19.8000; Longitude:32.8600).

Main Sights: Chimanimani has various nature-based attractions for visitors, most notably Bridal Veil Falls. The Bridal Veil picnic and camping site is located in a small national park about a 5 km (3.1 mi) walk, or a short drive, from the village. The falls itself plunges 50 m (160 ft) down a sheer rock face into a crystal clear pool. Close to the town are the Arboretum, Green Mount, and Pork Pie sanctuary.

The Chimanimani Mountains are a short 18 km (11 mi) drive from the village. There are numerous hiking trails throughout the rugged Chimanimani range. Local guides are available. For adventure activities there is an Outward Bound centre nearby. It offers a range of activities and life-skill programs, accommodation and camping facilities, and access to the Paradise Pool. Other attractions in the Chimanimani Mountain range include the Nyakwaha and Haroni Botanical Reserves, as well as the Haroni and Mukurupiri waterfalls.

== Climate ==
Chimanimani receives rainfall throughout the year. The average temperature is about 16 °C (61 °F).

== Economy ==
The local economy of Chimanimani is primarily based on agriculture, with crops such as maize, beans, and vegetables being grown. Livestock farming is also common in the area.

== History ==
Chimanimani was founded by the brothers Thomas Moodie and Dunbar Moodie in 1892. In 1895 it was moved to its current site and was officially called Melsetter after Moodie's family home in Orkney in Scotland. Following Zimbabwe's independence in 1980, the name of the town was changed to Mandidzudzure, in 1982. However, after consultation with the population, the name was changed to Chimanimani.

The city was badly hit by Cyclone Idai in 2019, and was cut off from the regional capital due to damage to roads. The primary school in Chikukwa was destroyed.

== Notable people from Chimanimani ==
- Samuel Undenge
- Munacho Mutezo
- Arthur Mutambara
- Tafataona Mahoso
- John Mangudya
- Tendai Chatara
- Learnmore Jonasi
- Joshua Sacco

== Population ==
The 1982 national census estimated the population of the town at 1,370. In 2004, the population of Chimanimani was estimated at 2,752. The next national population census in Zimbabwe is scheduled from 18 August 2012 through 28 August 2012. Most of the inhabitants of Chimanimani are of Ndau origin.

== See also ==
- Chimanimani District
- Manicaland Province
- Chimanimani National Park
