= Pink Map =

1886 Portuguese diplomatic document

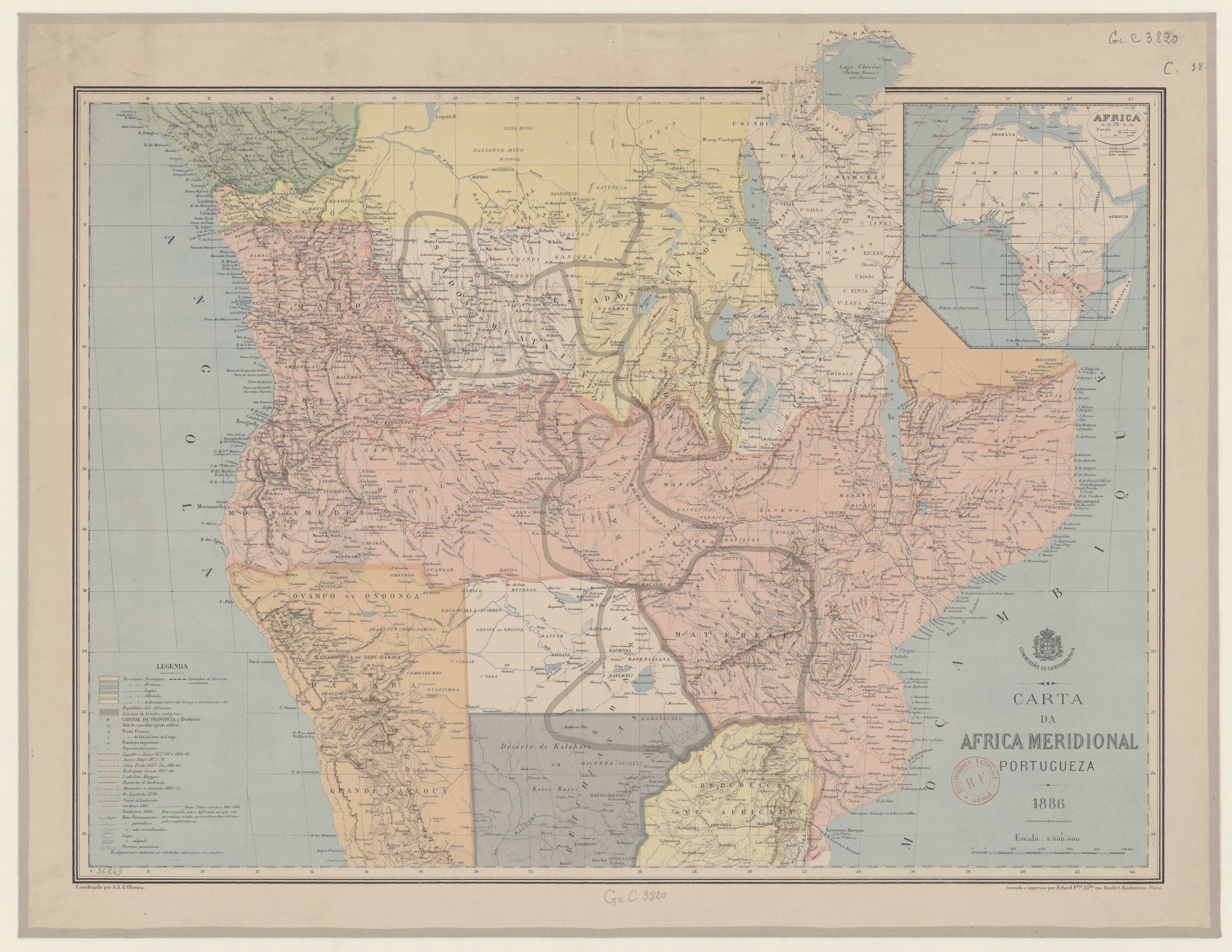
The original Pink Map (1886)

The Pink Map (Portuguese: Mapa cor-de-rosa, lit. 'Rose-coloured Map') was a map prepared in 1885 to represent the Kingdom of Portugal's claim of sovereignty over a land corridor connecting the Portuguese colonies of Angola and Mozambique during the Scramble for Africa. The area claimed included most of modern-day Zimbabwe and large parts of modern-day Zambia and Malawi.

In the first half of the 19th century, Portugal held total control over only a small number of coastal settlements in Angola and Mozambique. The Portuguese also claimed suzerainty over other de facto independent towns and nominal Portuguese subjects in the Zambezi valley, but could rarely enforce its claims; most of the territory now within Angola and Mozambique was entirely independent of Portugal's control. Between 1840 and 1869, Portugal expanded the area it controlled but felt threatened by the activities of other European colonial powers in the region.

The United Kingdom refused to acknowledge Portugal's claims in Africa which were not based on effective occupation, including a Portuguese offer in 1889 to abandon their claim to a transcontinental link in exchange for British recognition of other claims. The 1890 British Ultimatum ended Portuguese claims based on the discovery doctrine and recent exploration. The dispute seriously damaged the prestige of Portugal's monarchy among the Portuguese public, which rapidly turned to republicanism.

== Portuguese possessions 1800–1870 ==
The Rose-Coloured Map—Portugal's claim of sovereignty of the land between Portuguese Angola and Portuguese Mozambique.

=== In Angola ===
At the start of the 19th century, effective Portuguese governance in Portuguese Angola consisted of areas around Luanda and Benguela, and a few almost independent towns over which Portugal claimed suzerainty, the most northerly being Ambriz. In the late 18th and early 19th centuries, Angola's main function within the Portuguese Empire was supplying Brazil with slaves. This was facilitated first by the development of coffee plantations in southern Brazil from the 1790s onward, and second by the 1815 and 1817 agreements between the United Kingdom and Portugal limiting—at least on paper—Portuguese slave trading to areas south of the equator. This trade diminished after Brazilian independence in 1822 and more sharply following an 1830 agreement between Britain and Brazil by which the Brazilian government prohibited further imports of slaves. To find people for export as slaves from Angolan towns, Afro-Portuguese traders penetrated as far inland as Katanga and Kazembe, but otherwise few Portuguese moved inland and they did not attempt to establish control there. When the Brazilian slave trade declined, the Portuguese began using slaves for agricultural work on plantations stretching inland from Luanda along the Cuanza River, and to a lesser extent around Benguela. After the Portuguese founded Moçâmedes, south of Benguela, in 1840 and occupied Ambriz in 1855, Portugal controlled a continuous coastal strip from Ambriz to Moçâmedes, but little inland territory. Although Portugal claimed the Congo River estuary, Britain at best accepted limited Portuguese trading rights in the Cabinda enclave north of the river, although these rights did not make Cabinda Portuguese territory.

=== In Mozambique ===
Portugal had occupied parts of the Mozambique coast since the 16th century, but at the start of the 19th century Portuguese presence was limited to Mozambique Island, Ibo and Quelimane in northern Mozambique, outposts at Sena and Tete in the Zambezi valley, Sofala to the south of the Zambezi, and the port town Inhambane further south. Although Delagoa Bay was regarded as Portuguese territory, Lourenço Marques was not settled until 1781, and was temporarily abandoned after a 1796 French raid. In the late 18th century most of the people exported as slaves through Portuguese settlements in Mozambique were sent to Mauritius and Réunion, at that time both French colonies, but the Napoleonic Wars disrupted this trade, and by the early 19th century the Portuguese sent Mozambican slaves to Brazil. As was the case with Angola, slave exports declined after 1830 and were partly replaced by exports of ivory through Lourenço Marques from the 1840s onward.

The nadir of Portuguese fortunes in Mozambique came in the 1830s and 1840s when Lourenço Marques was sacked in 1833 and Sofala in 1835. Zumbo was abandoned in 1836 and the Gaza Empire forced Afro-Portuguese settlers near Vila de Sena to pay tribute. Although Portugal claimed sovereignty over Angoche and a number of smaller Muslim coastal towns, these were virtually independent at the start of the 19th century. However, after Portugal renounced the slave trade, these towns continued the practice. Fearing British or French anti-slavery interventions, Portugal began bringing these towns under stricter control. Angoche resisted and fought off a Portuguese warship attempting to prevent slave trading in 1847. It took another military expedition and occupation in 1860–1 to end Angoche's slave trade.

Portugal also initiated the Prazo system of large leased estates under nominal Portuguese rule in the Zambezi valley. By the end of the 18th century, the valleys of the Zambezi and lower Shire River were controlled by a few families who claimed to be Portuguese subjects but who were virtually independent. However, starting in 1840 the Portuguese government embarked on a series of military campaigns in an attempt to bring the prazos under its control. Portuguese troops suffered several major setbacks before forcing the last prazo to submit in 1869.

In other inland areas, there was not even the pretence of Portuguese control. In the interior of what is today southern and central Mozambique, Nguni people who had entered the area from South Africa under their leader Soshangane created the Gaza Empire in the 1830s and, up to Soshangane's death in 1856, dominated southern Mozambique outside the two towns of Inhambane and Lourenço Marques. Lourenço Marques only remained in Portuguese hands in the 1840s and early 1850s because the Swazi people vied with Gaza for its control. After Soshangane's death two of his sons struggled for succession, with the eventual winner Mzila coming to power with Portuguese help in 1861. Under Mzila the centre of Gaza power moved north to central Mozambique and came into conflict with the prazo owners who were expanding south from the Zambezi valley.

As in Angola, during the 18th century Afro-Portuguese traders employed by the Mozambican prazo owners penetrated inland from the Zambezi valley as far as Kazembe in search of ivory and copper. In 1798 Francisco de Lacerda, a Portuguese officer based in Mozambique, organised an expedition from Tete to the interior hoping to reach Kazembe, but he died en route in what is now Zambia. Antonio Gamitto tried to establish commercial relations with Kazembe peoples in the upper Zambezi valley in 1831 also without success. Apart from Lacerda's expedition, none of the trading ventures into the interior from Angola or Mozambique had official status and were not attempts to bring the area between Angola and Mozambique under Portuguese control. Even Lacerda's expedition was largely commercial in purpose, although it was later declared by the Lisbon Geographic Society to have established claim to the area it covered.

=== Elsewhere ===
After Brazilian independence and the loss of most Asian territories, Portuguese colonial expansion focused on Africa. In the late 1860s Lisbon had no effective presence in the area between Angola and Mozambique, and little presence in many areas lying within the present-day borders of those countries. By the second half of the 19th century, various European powers developed an increasing interest in Africa. The first challenge to Portugal's territorial claims came from the area around Delagoa Bay. The Boers who founded the South African Republic were concerned British occupation of the bay would threaten their independence, and to prevent this they claimed their own outlet to the Indian Ocean at Delagoa Bay in 1868. Although Portugal and the Transvaal reached agreement in 1869 on a border under which all of Delagoa Bay remained Portuguese, Britain then lodged a claim to the bay's southern part. This claim was rejected in 1875 after arbitration by French President MacMahon, which upheld the 1869 borders.

A further significant issue arose in the areas south and west of Lake Nyasa (now also known as Lake Malawi), which David Livingstone reached in the 1850s. In the 1860s and 1870s Anglicans and Presbyterians established several missions in the Shire Highlands, including a mission and small trading settlement founded at Blantyre in 1876. In 1878 businessmen linked to the Presbyterian missions established the African Lakes Company, which aimed to set up a trading venture that would work in close co-operation with the missions to combat the slave trade by introducing legitimate trade and to develop European influence in the area. Later, another challenge came from the foundation of a German colony at Angra Pequena (present-day Lüderitz) in Namibia in 1883. Although there was no Portuguese presence this far south Portugal claimed the Namibian coast, being the first European nation to have visited it.

== Portuguese exploration and early negotiation attempts ==
Though the Lacerda and Gamitto expeditions were largely commercial, the third quarter of the nineteenth century saw scientific African expeditions. The Portuguese government was suspicious of exploration by other European nations, particularly those whose leasers held an official (often consular) position as Livingstone had, which their home countries could use to claim territory Portugal regarded as its own. To prevent this the Lisbon Geographic Society and the Geographical Commission of the Portuguese Ministry of the Navy — at that time responsible for overseas territories as well as the navy— created a joint commission in 1875 to plan scientific expeditions to the area between Angola and Mozambique.

Although Minister of Foreign Affairs Andrade Corvo doubted Portugal's ability to achieve coast-to-coast empire, he sanctioned expeditions. Portuguese soldier and explorer Alexandre de Serpa Pinto led three such expeditions through which Portugal could attempt to assert its African territorial claims. The first was from Mozambique to the eastern Zambezi in 1869, the second to the Congo River and upper Zambezi from Angola in 1876, and the last in 1877–79 crossing Africa from Angola with the intention of claiming the area between Angola and Mozambique. In 1877 Portuguese explorers Hermenegildo Capelo and Roberto Ivens led an expedition from Luanda towards the Congo basin. Capelo made a second journey from Angola to Mozambique, largely following existing trade routes, in 1884–85.

During and after the Serpa Pinto and Capelo expeditions, the Portuguese government attempted bilateral negotiations with Britain. In 1879 as part of talks on a treaty on the freedom of navigation on the Congo and Zambezi rivers and the development of trade in those river basins, Portugal formally claimed the area south and east of the Ruo River (the present southeastern border of Malawi). The 1879 treaty was never ratified, and in 1882 Portugal occupied the lower Shire River valley as far as the Ruo, after which its government again asked Britain to accept this territorial claim, without success. Further bilateral negotiations led to a draft treaty in February 1884, which would have included British recognition of Portuguese sovereignty over the mouth of the Congo in exchange for freedom of navigation on the Congo and Zambezi rivers, but the Berlin Conference of 1884–85 ended these discussions which could have led to British recognition of Portuguese influence stretching across the continent. Portugal's efforts to establish a corridor of influence between Angola and Mozambique without gaining full political control were hampered by one of the articles in the General Act of the Berlin Conference requiring effective occupation of areas claimed rather than relying on historical claims based on early discovery or more recent claims based largely on exploration, as Portugal wished to use.

To validate Portuguese claims, Serpa Pinto was appointed as Portuguese consul in Zanzibar in 1884 with the mission of exploring the region between Lake Nyasa and the coast from the Zambezi to the Ruvuma River and securing the allegiance of chiefs in that area. His expedition reached Lake Nyasa and the Shire Highlands but failed to make treaties of protection with chiefs in territories west of the lake. At the northwest end of Lake Nyasa around Karonga the African Lakes Company made, or claimed to have made, treaties with local chiefs between 1884 and 1886. Its ambition was to become a chartered company and control the route from the lake along the Shire River. Its further ambition to control the Shire Highlands was given up in 1886 following protests from local missionaries that it could not police this area effectively.

== The Berlin Conference ==
The General Act of the Berlin Conference dated 26 February 1885 introduced the principle of effective occupation, potentially damaging Portuguese claims, particularly in Mozambique where other powers were active. Article 34 required a nation acquiring land on the coasts of Africa outside of its previous possessions to notify the other signatories of the Act so they could protest such claims. Article 35 of the Act provided that rights could only be acquired over previously uncolonised lands if the power claiming them had established sufficient authority there to protect existing rights and free trade. This implied making treaties with local rulers, establishing colonial administration, and exercising police powers. Initially Portugal claimed the Berlin Treaty did not apply to its territories and that Portugal was not required to issue notifications or establish effective occupation, as Portugal's claim to the Mozambique coast had existed unchallenged for centuries.

British officials did not accept this interpretation and in January 1884 Henry E. O'Neill, the British consul based at Mozambique Island, stated:

To speak of Portuguese colonies in East Africa is to speak of a mere fiction—a fiction colourably sustained by a few scattered seaboard settlements, beyond whose narrow littoral and local limits colonisation and government have no existence."

To forestall British designs on Mozambique and the interior that O'Neill claimed Portugal did not occupy, Portugal in 1884 commissioned its soldier Joaquim Carlos Paiva de Andrada to establish effective occupation. He was active in four areas: first, in 1884 he established the town of Beira and occupied Sofala Province. Also in 1884, he acquired a concession of an area within a 180-kilometre (110 mi) radius of Zumbo, west of where Afro-Portuguese families had traded and settled since the 1860s. Andrada only established colonial administration in 1889, when he founded an outpost beyond the confluence of the Zambezi and Kafue rivers and an administrative district based at Zumbo . In 1889 Andrada was granted another concession over Manica, covering today's Manica Province of Mozambique and Manicaland Province of Zimbabwe. Andrada obtained treaties over much of this area and established a rudimentary administration before he was arrested and expelled in November 1890 by the British South Africa Police (BSAP). Finally, in 1889 Andrada crossed northern Mashonaland (present-day Zimbabwe's Mashonaland Central Province) to obtain treaties. He failed to inform the Portuguese government of these treaties, so other powers were not formally notified of the claims as the Berlin Treaty required.

== The Pink Map ==
=== Portuguese transcontinental claims ===
Despite the outcome of the Berlin Conference and failed bilateral negotiations with Britain, Portugal continued pursuing a contiguous, transcontinental colonial territory. In 1885 the Portuguese Foreign Minister Barros Gomes published the so-called Pink or Rose-Coloured Map, a map representing a formal Portuguese claim to sovereignty over an area stretching from the Atlantic to the Indian Ocean. Portugal attempted to solidify the claim by signing treaties with France and Germany in 1886. To obtain the French treaty, Portugal relinquished its claim to the area around the Casamance River in Guinea in exchange for vague recognition of the Portuguese claim to an undefined area between Angola and Mozambique, with the Rose-Coloured Map attached to the treaty for information. To obtain a similar treaty with Germany, Portugal agreed to a southern boundary for Angola and northern boundary for Mozambique favourable to Germany. France and Germany's "noting" the Portuguese claims did not amount to their accepting the claims, only recognition that Portugal made such claims.

=== Post–Pink Map negotiation attempts ===
British Prime Minister Lord Salisbury formally protested the Rose-Coloured Map, but initially made no claim to the territories it represented. In July 1887 Salisbury stated the British government would not accept any Portuguese claim unless there were sufficient Portuguese forces in the claimed area to maintain order. The Portuguese government thought this meant Britain would accept a claim backed by effective occupation. Later in that year, the British minister in Lisbon proposed the Zambezi as the northern limit of British influence. This would have stranded Scottish missionaries in the Shire Highlands within the Portuguese zone and created a band of Portuguese territory linking Angola and Mozambique, though one significantly smaller than the Rose-Coloured Map proposed, as all of what is now Zimbabwe would be British territory. Portugal rejected the proposal because the Shire Highlands and Scottish missions could only be accessed through Portuguese coastal areas, and because the proposal would involve giving up the southern and more valuable half of the transcontinental zone claimed in the Rose-Coloured Map, apparently for little in return.

By 1889 the Portuguese government felt less confident and its Foreign Minister Barros Gomes informed the British government Portugal was willing to abandon its claim to a zone linking Angola and Mozambique in exchange for recognition of its claim to the Shire Highlands. This time the British government rejected the proposal, partly because of the strong opposition of the Scottish missions, and partly because the Chinde River entrance to the Zambezi was discovered in April 1889. This meant oceangoing ships could now enter the Zambezi and its tributary the Shire River, making them international waterways with access to the Shire Highlands.

=== British and Portuguese courting of local influence ===
Later popular perception in Britain suggested the Rose-Coloured Map was a direct challenge to Cecil Rhodes's vision of a "Cape to Cairo Red Line". The Cape to Cairo idea was first put forward by Henry "Harry" Hamilton Johnston in an August 1888 newspaper article three years after the Pink Map's publication and only later adopted by Rhodes. His British South Africa Company (BSAC) was founded in October 1888 and only received its royal charter enabling it to trade with local rulers; to buy, sell, and own land; and to operate a police force in Matabeleland and adjacent areas south of the Zambezi River in October 1889. From the incorporation of the BSAC, Rhodes and the company opposed Portuguese claims south of the Zambezi, and Rhodes made no secret of his intention to seize part of Mozambique to gain an outlet to the Indian Ocean. North of the Zambezi, Portuguese claims to the Shire Highlands were opposed by the African Lakes Company and the missionaries, the latter supported by public opinion, especially in Scotland. As late as 1888 the British Foreign Office declined protection to the tiny British settlements in the Shire Highlands. It did not accept expansion of Portuguese influence there, and in 1889 it appointed Harry Johnston as British consul to Mozambique and the Interior, instructing him to report on the extent of Portuguese presence in the Zambezi and Shire valleys. He was also to make conditional treaties with local rulers outside Portuguese control. These conditional treaties did not establish a British protectorate, but prevented the rulers from accepting protection from another state.

In 1888 Portuguese government representatives in Mozambique organised two expeditions to make treaties of protection with the Yao chiefs southeast of Lake Nyasa and in the Shire Highlands to establish Portuguese territorial claims. The first expedition under António Cardoso, former governor of Quelimane, set off in November 1888 for Lake Nyasa. The second expedition under Serpa Pinto, now governor of Mozambique, moved up the Shire Valley. The two expeditions resulted in over 20 treaties with chiefs in what is now Malawi. Serpa Pinto's expedition was well armed, partly in response to a Portuguese resident's request for help in resolving disturbances caused by the Makololo chiefs on the lower Shire River. David Livingstone had brought the Makololo into the area during his Zambezi expedition, and they remained on the Shire north and west of the Ruo River when the expedition ended in 1864. The Makololo claimed to be outside Portuguese control, and asked for British assistance to remain independent. Serpa Pinto met with British consul Harry Johnston in August 1889 east of the Ruo, when Johnston advised him not to cross the river into the Shire Highlands.

British settlers living in the Shire Highlands probably encouraged the Makololo to attack Serpa Pinto, resulting in a minor battle between Pinto's Portuguese troops and the Makololo on 8 November 1889 near the Shire River. Although Serpa Pinto had previously acted with caution, he then crossed the Ruo into what is now Malawi. When Pinto occupied much Makololo territory, Johnston's vice-consul John Buchanan accused Portugal of ignoring British interests in this area and declared a British protectorate over the Shire Highlands in December 1889, despite contrary instructions. Shortly after this, Johnston declared a further protectorate over the area to the west of Lake Nyasa, also contrary to his instructions, although both protectorates were later endorsed by the Foreign Office. These actions formed the background to an Anglo-Portuguese crisis in which a British refusal of arbitration was followed by the 1890 British Ultimatum.

== Resolution ==
=== 1890 ultimatum ===
The 1890 British Ultimatum is a memorandum Prime Minister Lord Salisbury sent to the Portuguese government on 11 January 1890 in which he demanded the withdrawal of Portuguese troops from Mashonaland and Matabeleland (now Zimbabwe) and from the area between the Shire River north of the Ruo and Lake Nyasa (including all the Shire Highlands), where Portuguese and British interests overlapped. The ultimatum meant Britain now claimed sovereignty over territories Portugal had claimed for centuries. There was no dispute regarding the borders of Angola, as neither country effectively occupied any part of the sparsely populated border area. Historians have argued that Lord Salisbury's diplomatically isolated government used tactics that could have led to war because they feared humiliation from Portuguese success. King Carlos I of Portugal accepted the ultimatum, causing anti-British demonstrations and riots in Portugal. Portuguese republicans used it as an excuse to attack the government, and staged a failed January 1891 coup d’état in Porto.

Though the ultimatum required Portugal cease activity in the disputed areas, it did not restrict further British occupation there. Between the British issuing the ultimatum and the signing of a treaty in Lisbon on 11 June 1891, both Britain and Portugal tried to occupy more of the disputed areas and assert their authority. Although the Portuguese established rudimentary administration in Manicaland in 1884 and strengthened this in 1889 before there was BSAC presence in the area, in November 1890, BSAP personnel arrested and expelled the Portuguese officials in an attempt to gain access to the coast and there were armed clashes between Rhodes's men and Portuguese troops already in Manicaland. The British government refused to accept existing Portuguese administration; fighting only stopped when Rhodes's company was awarded part of Manicaland. Buchanan further asserted British sovereignty over the Shire Highlands by executing two Afro-Portuguese cipais (soldiers), claiming they were within British jurisdiction.

=== Bilateral treaty ===
The General Act of the Berlin Conference required arbitration of disputes. After the ultimatum Portugal requested arbitration, but because the 1875 Delagoa Bay arbitration had favoured of Portugal, Lord Salisbury refused and demanded a bilateral treaty. Talks started in Lisbon in April 1890, and in May the Portuguese delegation proposed joint administration of the disputed area. The British government refused, drafting a treaty that imposed boundaries generally unfavourable to Portugal. This led to a wave of protests and dissolution of the Portuguese Parliament when the draft treaty was published. This treaty did grant Portugal rights to build a railway, road, and telegraph line along the Zambezi River's north bank, which would have provided a limited link between Angola and Mozambique.

The new Portuguese Parliament refused to ratify the agreement in August 1890, leading to further negotiations. The 1891 draft treaty granted Portugal more territory in the Zambezi Valley than the 1890 treaty, in exchange for Portugal's giving up what is now the Manicaland Province of Zimbabwe. This treaty also set Angola's borders and provided for freedom of navigation on the Zambezi and Shire rivers. Britain and Portugal signed the treaty in Lisbon on 11 June 1891. However, it gave Portugal no special rights along the Zambezi's northern bank, effectively ending Portugal's Pink Map project.

== See also ==
- Campaigns of Pacification and Occupation

== General and cited sources ==
- Axelson, Eric (1967). Portugal and the Scramble for Africa. Johannesburg: Witwatersrand University Press. LCCN 67102937. OCLC 476312.
- Berlin Conference (January 1909). "General Act of the Conference of Berlin Concerning the Congo". American Journal of International Law. 3 (1). New York: Baker, Vorhees for the American Society for International Law: 7–25. doi:10.2307/2212022. JSTOR 2212022.
- Clarence-Smith, William Gervase (1985). The Third Portuguese Empire 1825–1975: A Study in Economic Imperialism. Manchester: Manchester University Press. ISBN 978-0-719-01719-3.
- Hammond, R. J. (1966). Portugal and Africa 1815–1910: A Study in Uneconomic Imperialism. Stanford, California: Stanford University Press. ISBN 0-804-70296-9. LCCN 66017561.
- Keppel-Jones, Arthur (1983). Rhodes and Rhodesia: The White Conquest of Zimbabwe 1884–1902. Kingston & Montreal: McGill-Queen's University Press. ISBN 978-0-773-56103-8..
- Livermore, H. V. (1966). A New History of Portugal. Cambridge: Cambridge University Press. LCCN 65019147.
- Livermore, Harold (1992). "Consul Crawfurd and the Anglo-Portuguese Crisis of 1890". Portuguese Studies. 8. Cambridge: Modern Humanities Research Association: 170–188. doi:10.2307/41105738. ISSN 0267-5315. JSTOR 41105738.
- Lovejoy, Paul E. (2012). Transformations in Slavery: A History of Slavery in Africa. African Studies Series, no. 117 (3rd ed.). Cambridge: Cambridge University Press. ISBN 978-1107002968.
- McCraken, John (2012). A History of Malawi, 1859–1966. Woodbridge, United Kingdom: James Currey. ISBN 978-1-84701-050-6.
- Newitt, Malyn D. D. (1969). "The Portuguese on the Zambezi: An Historical Interpretation of the Prazo system". The Journal of African History. 10 (1). Cambridge: Cambridge University Press: 67–85. doi:10.1017/S0021853700009282. ISSN 0021-8537.
- Newitt, Malyn (1995). A History of Mozambique. Bloomington: Indiana University Press. ISBN 978-0253340061.
- Nowell, Charles E. (March 1947). "Portugal and the Partition of Africa". The Journal of Modern History. 19 (1). Chicago: University of Chicago Press: 1–17. doi:10.1086/237079.
- Nowell, Charles E. (1982). The Rose-Coloured Map: Portugal's Attempt to Build an African Empire from the Atlantic to the Indian Ocean. Lisbon: Junta de Investigações Científicas do Ultramar. OCLC 1242924137.
- Paiva de Andrada, Joaquim Carlos (1885). Relatorio de uma viagem ás terras dos Landins [Report of a trip to the lands of the Landins] (in Portuguese). Lisbon: Imprensa Nacional.
- Paiva de Andrada, Joaquim Carlos (1886). Relatorio de uma viagem ás terras do Changamira [Report of a trip to the lands of the Changamira] (in Portuguese). Lisbon: Imprensa Nacional.
- Pike, John G. (1969). Malawi: A Political and Economic History. Praeger Library of African Affairs. New York: Frederick A. Praeger. LCCN 68-021904.
- Rotberg, Robert I. (1965). The Rise of Nationalism in Central Africa: The Making of Malawi and Zambia, 1873–1964. Cambridge: Harvard University Press. LCCN 65-19829.
- Rotberg, Robert I. (1988). The Founder: Cecil Rhodes and the Pursuit of Power. New York: Oxford University Press. ISBN 978-0195049688.
- Tamburini, Francesco (2014). "Il ruolo dell'Italia nella vertenza anglo-portoghese sui territori dell'Africa australe: dal mapa-cor-de-rosa al Barotseland (1886–1905)" [Italy's role in the Anglo-Portuguese dispute over territories in Southern Africa: From the "Pink Map" to Barotseland (1886–1905)]. Africana: Rivista di studi extraeuropei (in Italian). doi:10.4399/97888548765219. ISSN 1592-9639.
