= Mutambara, Manicaland =

Mutambara
- Village
- Location within Zimbabwe
- Coordinates: 19.553187450025536°S 32.65568714597427°E
- Country: Zimbabwe
- Province: Manicaland
- District: Mutare
- Time zone: UTC+2 (Central Africa Time)

Mutambara is a village in Manicaland Province, Zimbabwe located 16 km west of Cashel. It is the administrative centre of the Mutambara communal land.

The East Central Africa Mission Conference of the Methodist Episcopal Church established a mission there in 1905. The government of Southern Rhodesia had set aside the land for the settlement of Africans. John Wesley Zwomunondiita Kurewa reports in his history of the Methodist mission in Zimbabwe that "the area was populous fertile, and well watered by two rivers." Stephen Tiki, a man from the area, was appointed by the Methodist church to preach there and American missionaries A.L. Buckwalter, his wife M.B. Spears, and another woman, Edith Bell, arrived in 1908. The new arrivals started a school.

Irrigation in the area began in 1908, with a project intended to irrigate 200 acres. By 1961, 300 acres were irrigated from the Umvumvumvu River. In the 1990's, partly due to decreased rainfall, there was conflict in the area over water rights among the Mutumbara Mission, the Mutumbara Irrigation Scheme and other water users in the Umvumvumvu River watershed.
