= Treaty of Windsor (1899) =

1899 treaty between the United Kingdom and Portugal

The Treaty of Windsor was a secret colonial declaration between the United Kingdom and Portugal in 1899. It was named after the earlier Treaty of Windsor (1386) though actually signed in London on 14 October 1899 by the British Prime Minister Lord Salisbury and the Portuguese ambassador Marquis of Soveral.

Anglo-Portuguese relations in Africa had been strained by the 1890 British Ultimatum which had blocked Portugal from joining its colonies in Angola and Mozambique across what later became Malawi, Zambia and Zimbabwe leading to the Anglo-Portuguese Treaty of 1891, and by an Anglo-German understanding in 1898 that, if Portugal relinquished its African colonies, Germany could expand German South West Africa northwards and German East Africa southwards while Great Britain could expand its South African territory eastwards and control Portugal's Atlantic islands.

The 1899 declaration reaffirmed former treaties between the two countries, including those of 1642 and 1661. Great Britain agreed to defend Portuguese colonies from their "future and present" enemies. Portugal agreed to not declare neutrality officially in the forthcoming Second Boer War and to prevent Boer movement of arms and troops through Lourenço Marques and Mozambique to the Transvaal.
