= Public Order and Security Act (Zimbabwe) =

The Public Order and Security Act (POSA) is a piece of legislation introduced in Zimbabwe in 2002 by a ZANU-PF dominated parliament. The act was amended in 2007 and repealed in 2018, after being replaced by the Maintenance of Peace and Order Act.

Jonathan Moyo is reported as having been one of the chief architects of the act, as he served as the Minister of Information and Publicity. Moyo has denied such an accusation citing the fact he has never held office in the relevant ministry (law and order legislations come from the Ministry of Home Affairs). Other individuals allegedly involved in the bill's passage include President Emmerson Mnangagwa, Dr. Dumiso Dabengwa, and John Landa Nkomo.

Many regard POSA as an act that helped Robert Mugabe consolidate his power. The law gave untold powers to the police, the Zimbabwe Republic Police (ZRP) and enabled them to squash political dissent at a large scale.

POSA has since been applied against demonstrations by the government. On 1 August 2018 the law was invoked, resulting in the army fatally shooting protesters against alleged rigging of the Zimbabwean general election, 2018. Although the law has since been repealed, its main provisions were retained and incorporated into the 2019 Maintenance of Peace and Order Act.

== Historical roots of POSA ==
When POSA was passed by the ZANU-PF dominated parliament in 2002, it was not an entirely new law, as it served to replace the Law and Order Maintenance Act of 1960 (LOMA). This law predated the independence of Zimbabwe, and is a relic of oppressive Rhodesian era legislation. Although the law intended to serve the white minority in Rhodesia, its broad application proved useful to Mugabe who used the law to suppress dissent after he came to power. While LOMA originated in the 1960s, efforts to pass the Public Order and Security Bill began in 1988 when a version was passed in Parliament, though it initially faced opposition from President Mugabe. This version was spearheaded by Emmerson Mnangagwa who, as Justice Minister, worked alongside Dr. Dumiso Dabengwa, who served as Home Affairs Minister. However, as this version rejected by President Mugabe, they can only be credited for the early version of the bill, that later underwent major revisions before it was reintroduced in 2001 and ultimately signed into law by Mugabe in 2002. In a 2018 article for The Chronicle, Dabengwa claimed to be the "brain child" of POSA, however he suggests that the changes made by his predecessor John Nkomo diluted his version of the bill, and made it more similar to the original piece of Rhodesian legislation LOMA.

== Controversies and legislative challenges ==
In 2005, ahead of the general election, Trocaire, an international NGO dedicated to serving vulnerable communities globally, published a report on Zimbabwe's obstacle to democracy, in which they point to POSA as inhibiting the democratic process and a free and fair election. POSA poses challenges to a free press ahead of the election, as it enables police to ban public demonstrations in a given area for up to three months, if they believe it would prevent public disorder.

In 2007 Human Rights Watch reported their concern over the usage of the Public Order and Security Act to arrest individuals in violation of their rights. They claim the law has been employed to squash peaceful protests, and surveil the community. Its usage to violate human rights is also linked to other laws such as the Miscellaneous Offences Act (MOA), the Access to Information and Protection of Privacy Act (AIPPA), and the Criminal Law (Codification and Reform) Act.

A Human Rights Report was issued by the U.S Department of State in the wake of the 2018 Zimbabwean uprising that occurred as a result of the general election that took place in July 2018. The results of the election enshrined a ZANU–PF majority in both the National Assembly and the Senate, as well as the appointment of incumbent President Emmerson Mnangagwa. The legitimacy of the election was called into question, considering the 2017 coup, which appointed Emmerson Mnangagwa as the interim leader. Members of the public and international community pointed to inconsistencies in the voter roll, and with fears that the election would provide legitimacy to the 2017 coup. The report noted POSA had been enacted following a demonstration that saw the death of seven opposition protestors on 1 August 2018. The Act was further invoked to prevent political dissidents from holding public events that could oppose the positions of the majority ZANU-PF government.

Later in 2018, the Zimbabwe Constitutional Court ruled that Section 29 of POSA was unconstitutional, as this section specifically allowed local law enforcement to prohibit public demonstrations in their jurisdictions for an indefinite period. This provision was deemed unconstitutional because it violated the constitution's protections of both the right to peacefully assemble and the right to protest.

== Amendments to POSA ==
The Public Order and Security Act was first amended in 2007 to provide organizers with greater flexibility in appealing meeting bans, shifting the appeal process from the Home Affairs Minister to the local magistrate court.

In 2018 lawmakers proposed amending the POSA, in order to align the provisions of the bill with their existing constitution. The Minister of Justice Legal and Parliamentary Affairs, Ziyambi Ziyambi, criticized the Home Affairs Ministry of not complying with the constitution and created a bill tracker that identified the laws that need amending to flag them to the Attorney General. In Vision 2030, also published in 2018, the government formally announced amending POSA, in addition to the Citizens Act, and the Access to Information and Protection of Privacy Act (AIPPA).

The process to amend POSA came to head in November in 2019, when the law was replaced by a new piece of legislation, known as the Maintenance of Peace and Order Act. While the Act repealed many provisions of POSA, it maintained its purpose of setting limitations on public demonstrations and gathering, effectively regulating citizens' ability to engage in free speech.

What does the Maintenance of Peace and Order Act do?

- Created regulations on assemblies that apply to public demonstrations and public meetings, which can be defined as a gathering of more than 15 people that is accessible to members of the public.
- Limits the proximity of demonstrations near Parliament, courts, and other protected places, with exceptions for gatherings that receive written permission.
- Sets a list of requirements for who needs to be notified if a gathering or public demonstration is taking place
- Imposes a series of fines and penalties for failing to comply with the provisions of the law, varying in severity.

The Maintenance of Peace and Order Act is simply a new iteration of POSA that poses new challenges to freedom of speech within Zimbabwe, and has seen a new wave of criticism since its passage and implementation in 2019. Critics of the Act have suggested that similarly to POSA, the new law violates provisions of the constitution, and enables potential human rights violations. An MP for the Harare East constituency, Tendai Biti called the bill "fundamentally flawed” and claims “It seeks to protect the regime through the guise of law and order yet the key right to be protected is the right to petition and demonstrate spelt out in section 59 of the constitution. It’s therefore a worse version of LOMA and POSA".
