= Bridal Veil Falls (Chimanimani) =

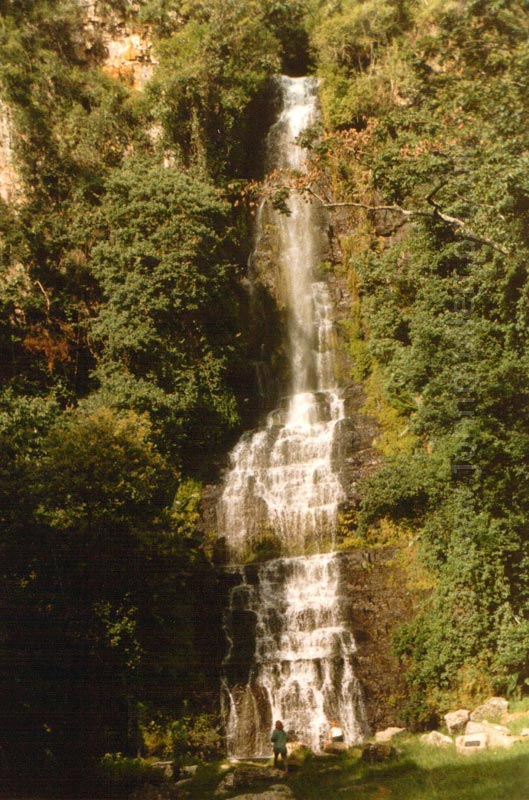
- Bridal Veil Falls in 2006

- Location within Zimbabwe
- Location: Chimanimani, Chimanimani District, Zimbabwe
- Coordinates: 19.7673°S 32.9849°E

Bridal Veil Falls, also known as Bridalveil Falls, is a waterfall in Chimanimani, Zimbabwe. Located within the boundaries of Chimanimani National Park, the waterfall is famed for its natural beauty.

== Description ==
Bridal Veil Falls is located in the mountains above the Zimbabwean town of Chimanimani. They are famed for their beauty and relative remoteness; as such, the site has become a destination for photographers and ecotourists. In 2019, it was feared that heavy rains brought on by Cyclone Idai had destroyed the falls—reports later confirmed that the waterfall had survived the storm, albeit with much of the surrounding vegetation having been destroyed in the flooding.
