= Chinde =

- Location within Mozambique
- Coordinates: 18°35′S 36°28′E
- Country: Mozambique
- Provinces: Zambezia Province
- District: Chinde District

Chinde is a town of Mozambique, and a port for the Zambezi valley. It is located on the Chinde River, and is an important fishing center. It exports copra and sugar, and had a population of 16,500 in 1980. Chinde lies in Chinde District of Zambezia Province.

== History ==
The small town of Chinde, located approximately 40 miles south of Quelimane, developed as the main point of entry for passengers and goods for the British Central Africa Protectorate which was proclaimed in 1891. Because of its favourable location on the Chinde River, part of the Zambezi River delta, it had potential for growth, and superseded both Quelimane and Conceição as the most suitable port of entry .

Until the third quarter of the 19th century, Quelimane, which was linked to the Zambezi river by a shallow channel, was the main port giving access to Central Africa. The Congress of Berlin in 1884 established free navigation of the Zambezi and its tributary rivers, and a number of British missionaries and traders who had started to visit and settle in what is now Malawi traveled there using the Zambezi and Shire River. When the channel from Quelimane became blocked, the search for an alternative route led to the discovery of the Chinde mouth of the Zambezi in 1889. As part of the Anglo-Portuguese Treaty of 1891, the Portuguese government granted the British government the Chinde Concession for 99 years to establish a port where seagoing ships could transfer their cargoes to river steamers. The Inner Concession, which was exempt from Portuguese custom duties, had an area of 10 hectares, with a river frontage of 420 yards. This contained the government offices and the commercial warehouses, workshops and stores. A further 50 hectares without customs exemption, the Outer Concession, was designed to house the slowly growing population of Chinde. The site selected was a sandspit with the Indian Ocean to the south and the Chinde river to the north. A tidal creek virtually separated the Concession from the mainland, making it more of an island than a peninsula.

Chinde briefly flourished as the port for British Central Africa, which became Nyasaland in 1907. At the end of the 19th century, ocean-going ships of the Union Castle and German East Africa lines were met at Chinde by small river steamers which took passengers and goods up to the head of navigation on the Shire River at Katunga, the closest point on the river to Blantyre, the main town in the British Central Africa Protectorate, a journey of around seven days. The African Lakes Company had trading station at the Concession and maintained around six steamers of up to 40 tons on the Zambezi and Shire rivers. Two other British companies had five more steamers of 20 to 30 tons in this route.

For several years before 1922, the erosion of the soft sand in which the Concession was built became an increasing problem. Many of the earlier buildings had to be taken down and re-erected to avoid being washed away or replaced. By the time the port was severely damaged by a cyclone in February 1922 it was already in decline because only relatively small ships could use it and the port of Beira was a better alternative. It would have been difficult and very expensive to restore Chinde fully, but some attempt was made to repair the worst of the damage. However, once the rail link from Nyasaland to Beira was completed in 1922, the main purpose for the existence of the Concession was removed. The British Concession was abandoned and the lease was cancelled in 1923. Chinde returned to Portuguese control: it ceased to serve as a port for Nyasaland, but continued to act as a local port, particularly for the sugar exports of Sena Sugar Estates from the Zambezi valley.
