= Gaza people =

Ethnic group in Southern Africa

The Gaza were Nguni people who left what is now South Africa in 1889 and settled in Gazaland in what is now Southern Mozambique. An early leader was Soshangane (c. 1828), under whom they migrated somewhat further North to the Save River area.
