= Tobaiwa Mudede =

Registrar-General of Zimbabwe
- Incumbent
- Assumed office 1980
- President: Canaan Banana
- Prime Minister: Robert Mugabe
- President: Robert Mugabe

Personal details
- Born: 11 January 1944 (age 82) Zvimba, Rhodesia and Nyasaland
- Party: ZANU-PF
- Spouse: Sarah

Tobaiwa Mudede was the Registrar-General of Zimbabwe for Robert Mugabe's government. Mudede has been accused by international human rights organizations of falsifying voting records to ensure Mugabe remains in power. Mudede gained a reputation from foreign journalists as a key player in press censorship and a culpable member of the Mugabe regime for human rights violations.

== Elections ==
Tobaiwa Mudede has been in charge of all elections held in Zimbabwe since 1980. His critics charge him with manipulating the elections to favor President Mugabe and ZANU-PF, a charge he denies.

== Family ==
Tobaiwa Mudede is related to writer and filmmaker Charles Mudede.
