= Samuel Undenge =

Zimbabwean politician (born 1956)

Samuel Undenge (born 1956) is a Zimbabwean politician. He is the former Energy and Power Development Minister. Until 2018 he was a member of parliament from the Chimanimani East constituency in Manicaland Province. He was formerly the Minister of Energy and Power Development and before that the Deputy Minister of Economic Planning and Investment Promotion.

Until November 2017 he was a member of the ZANU-PF political party. As member of the Generation 40 faction led by former first lady Grace Mugabe, Undenge and other Generation 40 politicians, including Grace Mugabe, were expelled from ZANU-PF by the party's central committee on 19 November 2017.

== Imprisonment ==
On 5 January 2018 Undenge was arrested on charges of corruption for awarding, during his tenure as Minister of Energy and Power Development, a $12,650 public relations contract to a private company, Fruitful Communications, without due tender. He was granted bail and his trial commenced in April 2018. In July he was convicted and sentenced to 5 years in prison. His case and sentence are on appeal.
