= Chinde River =

River in Mozambique

Coordinates: 18°35′S 36°28′E

The Chinde River is a distributary of the Zambezi river delta in Mozambique. The town of Chinde is located on its banks.
