= Thomas Moodie (Rhodesian settler) =

Thomas Moodie (29 November 1839 – 30 April 1894) was a pioneer who in 1892 led a party of mostly Afrikaner farmers from the Orange Free State to settle in Rhodesia. Moodie, known as "Groot Tom", left Bethlehem on 5 May 1892 with his party, and settled on 4 January 1893, establishing the town of Melsetter, named after the Moodie ancestral home in the Orkney Islands. Thomas Moodie was buried in the Melsetter area. After his death, his wife Cecelia Moodie returned to her relatives in the South African Republic, where she died in 1905 and was buried on the farm Rietvlei, today known as the Rietvlei Nature Reserve, south of Pretoria.
