= Access to Information and Protection of Privacy Act (Zimbabwe) =

2002 law

Parliament of Zimbabwe
- Long title: An Act to provide members of the public with a right of access to records and information held by public bodies; to make public bodies accountable by giving the public a right to request correction of misrepresented personal information; to prevent the unauthorised collection, use or disclosure of personal information by public bodies; to protect personal privacy; to provide for the regulation of the mass media; to establish a Media and Information Commission and to provide for matters connected therewith or incidental to the foregoing.
- Citation: Chapter 10:27
- Enacted by: Parliament of Zimbabwe
- Commenced: 15 March 2002
- Repealed: 1 July 2020

Amends
- Official Secrets Act

Repealed by
- Freedom of Information Act, 2020
- Status: Repealed

The Access to Information and Protection of Privacy Act (AIPPA) was passed in 2002 by the Zimbabwean Parliament under the majority of the Zimbabwe African National Union – Patriotic Front (ZANU–PF) and Former President Robert Mugabe.

Amendments were made in 2003 concerning the definition of mass media services, journalistic abuses and heads of offices (Media Institute of Southern Africa, 2003) and 2005 with regard to the imprisonment of journalists According to the official Zimbabwean government position, Canada’s information legislation served as an inspiration for the AIPPA However, the non-governmental organisation ARTICLE 19 suggests, it was rather the context of the growing opposition party and the nearly electoral defeat of the ruling ZANU-PF in 2000 pushing for more restrictive laws on independent and government media.

The AIPPA shall provide a legal framework for the access and conduct of requesting information from public bodies and privacy as well as for the regulation of mass media by the establishment of a Media and Information Commission. Especially the latter is subject to harsh critique from various governments, non-governmental organisations and the UN Special Rapporteur on Freedom of Opinion and Expression because of severe media restrictions. Following the massive critique, David Banisar stated that AIPPA is a rather cynic name for a media suppressing law.

== Access to Information ==
In terms of entitlement, only citizens of Zimbabwe, permanently residents or holders of temporary employment, residence permit or students permit are eligible to make a request. Foreign nationals and agencies as well as unregistered mass media are excluded. This contrasts with chapter four of the African Commission on Human and Peoples’ Rights stating that everyone should have the right to access information held by public bodies Declaration of Principles on Freedom of Expression in Africa. After the request is made, a response on behalf of the public office regarding the applicability should be sent within 30 days. However, these 30 days can be extended on the grounds of various reasons with the agreement of the Media and Information Commission. One possible reason might be that the request is not in the public interest.

== Exemptions ==
There is a variety of exemptions where information can always be withheld ranging from deliberation of the cabinet, details of policy advice to national security. However, whether information regarding heritage sites, economic interests, public interests and governmental relations should be disclosed, is subject to the public office’s discretion This reverses the openness approach where public interest is considered being a driving factor for disclosing documents. According to the non-governmental organisation ARTICLE 19, the right of information can be considered largely “illusory” due to the extensive list of exemptions as well as due to the fact that appeals against refusals procedure rely on the government dependent Media and Information Commission.

== The Media and Information Commission ==
The establishment and functions of the Media and Information Commission are laid out in Part IV of AIPPA. The Media and Information Commission is organised by a board where all members are appointed by the Minister responsible for information, after having consulted the president. Regarding the access of information, it is up to the Commission to decide about appeals against refusals regarding requests on access of information and to authorise public bodies to disregard requests that might interfere with the operation of the respective body. Its other main functions are to ensure the access of Zimbabweans to mass media information on the grounds of ethical and professional standards by exercising control on respective services. Therefore, the commission is entitled to conduct investigations, decide upon journalists’ accreditation as well as to regulate mass media services.

In terms of regulation, AIPPA restricts the ownership or shareholding of mass media services to anyone other than Zimbabwean citizens or permanent residents. Similar provisions can be found within the matter of journalists’ accreditation, also just limited to Zimbabwean citizens or permanent residents. Furthermore, all mass media services have to register with the commission in order to obtain a certificate and to reapply for its renewal after two years. Mass media operating without a certificate and abuse of journalistic privileges are penalised with a fine and up two years of imprisonment. Abuse of journalistic privileges is further defined by intentional and unintentional false information or statements threatening the interests of defence, public safety, public morality or economic interests.

In this context, terms such as public morality are not further defined. Critics of the Media and Information Commission span from its comprehensive authority and competences to its organisation. The organisation structure is subject to concern for critics suggesting that the strong government ties reduce the Commission’s neutrality and independence which is one of the Declaration of Principles on Freedom of Expression in Africa principles. The Zimbabwe Lawyers for Human Rights and The Legal Resources Foundation versus The President of the Republic of Zimbabwe and the Attorney-General case indicates that the decision on whether to disclose publicly held information is rather a policy decision made by politicians and not by the courts and set a wrong precedent to those that might think of appealing against refusals by heads of public offices.

Furthermore, the outlined process of registering does not correspond to the UN Special Rapporteur on Freedom of Opinion and Expression, the OSCE Representative on Freedom of the Media and the OAS Special Rapporteur on Freedom of Expression as stated in a Declaration of 18/12/2003:

“Imposing special registration requirements on the print media is unnecessary and may be abused and should be avoided. Registration systems which allow for discretion to refuse registration (…) which are overseen by bodies which are not independent of government are particularly problematical (p. 31).

Remarkably, the provision on registering are rather broad, covering even the smallest and irregular forms as well as all forms of digital and electronic publications. According to ARTICLE 19, there are also serious concerns regarding the sanctioning of breaches of the AIPPA granting considerate discretion to political actors such as the minister. Furthermore, it is feared that the deterring effect of this strict, normally “last resort” sanctions such as termination and suspension will have a negative impact of the freedom of expression.

== Application ==
Due to the non-transparent nature of the Information and Media Commission it is rather difficult to gather reliable data regarding the number of people who were granted access to information under AIPPA. However, it is worth noting that as of 2006, there could be just one successful case be identified where the opposition party was granted access to data.

Information gathering difficulties and small numbers of successful requests can be contrasted with high numbers of independent newspapers being shut down and journalists arrested in the aftermaths of AIPPA. According to Freedom House, more prominent example are the British Broadcasting Cooperation (BBC) and the Cable News Network (CNN) that were banned in 2002 until the ban was lifted in 2009. The government made use of AIPPA and the 2004 Criminal Law to prosecute critical journalists and activists during the 2008 election crisis. More recently, AIPPA enabled the detainment of seventeen journalists in 2013.
