= Eastern Highlands =

Mountain range in Zimbabwe and Mozambique

Coordinates: 18.723°S 32.842°E

Eastern Highlands Eastern Zimbabwe montane forest-grassland mosaic
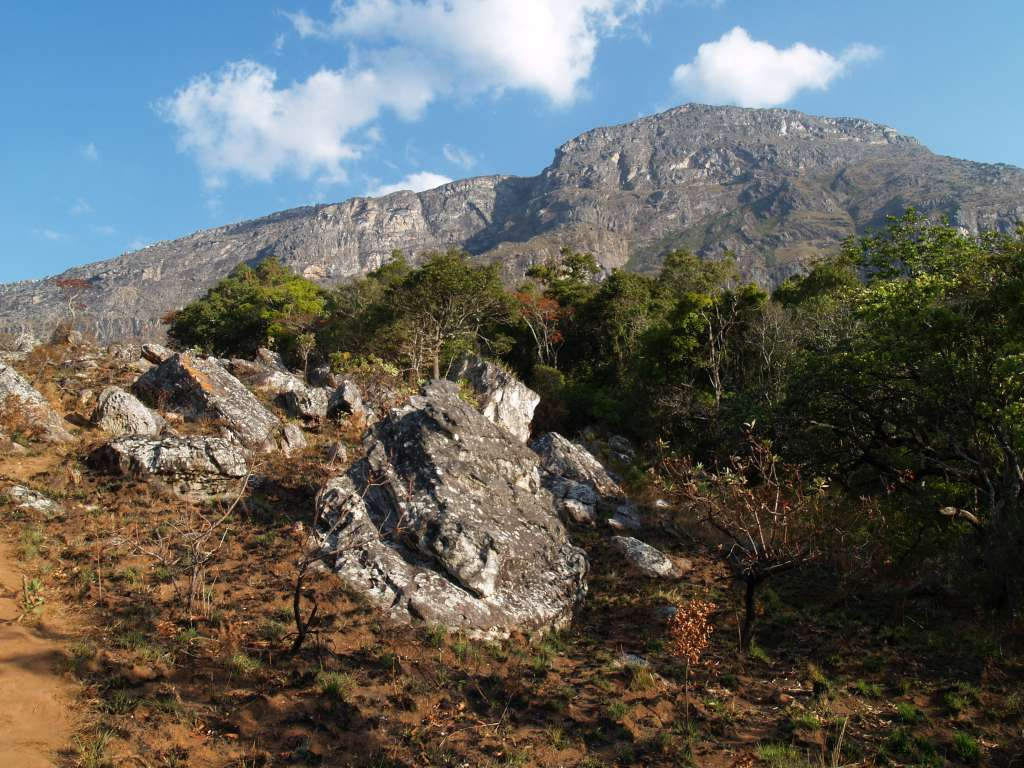
- North face of Monte Binga in the Chimanimani Mountains

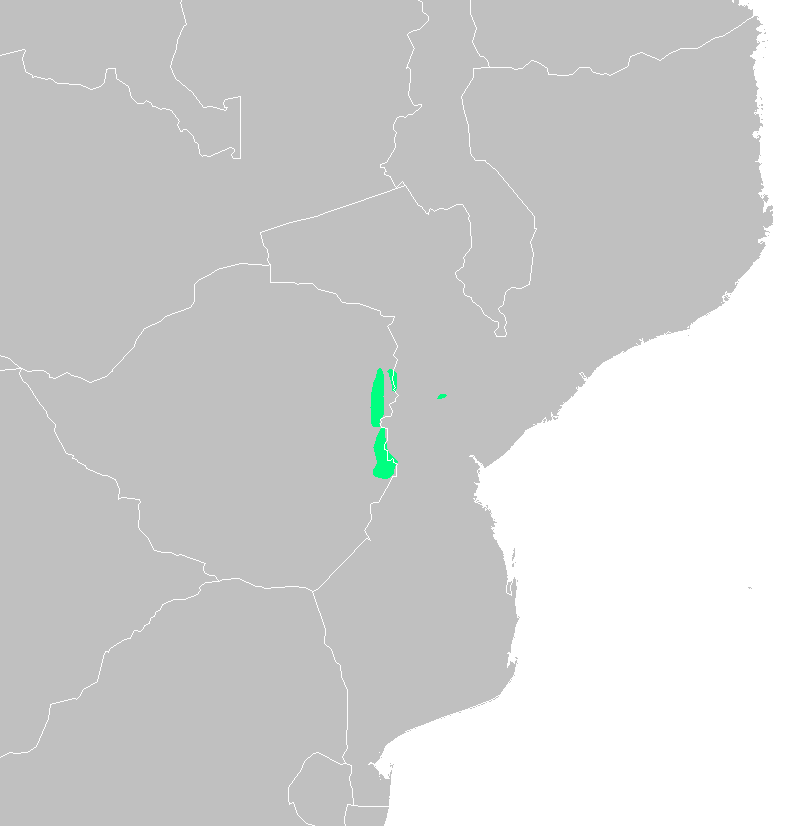
- Extent of the Eastern Zimbabwe montane forest-grassland mosaic

Ecology
- Realm: Afrotropical
- Biome: Montane grasslands and shrublands

Geography
- Area: 7,770 km^{2} (3,000 mi^{2})
- Countries: Mozambique; Zimbabwe

Conservation
- Conservation status: critical/endangered
- Protected: 14.13%

"Eastern Highlands" also refers to Eastern Highlands Province in Papua New Guinea, and part of the Great Dividing Range, Australia.

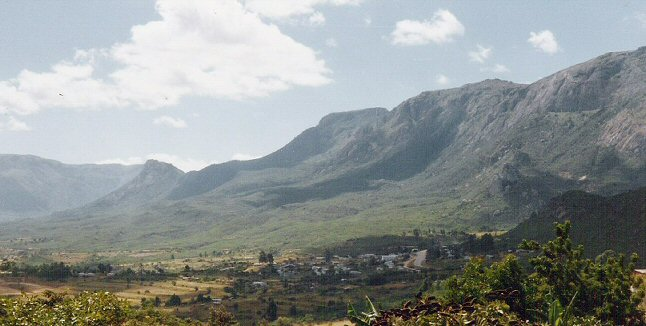
Northern part of the Eastern Highlands range as seen from Nyanga town

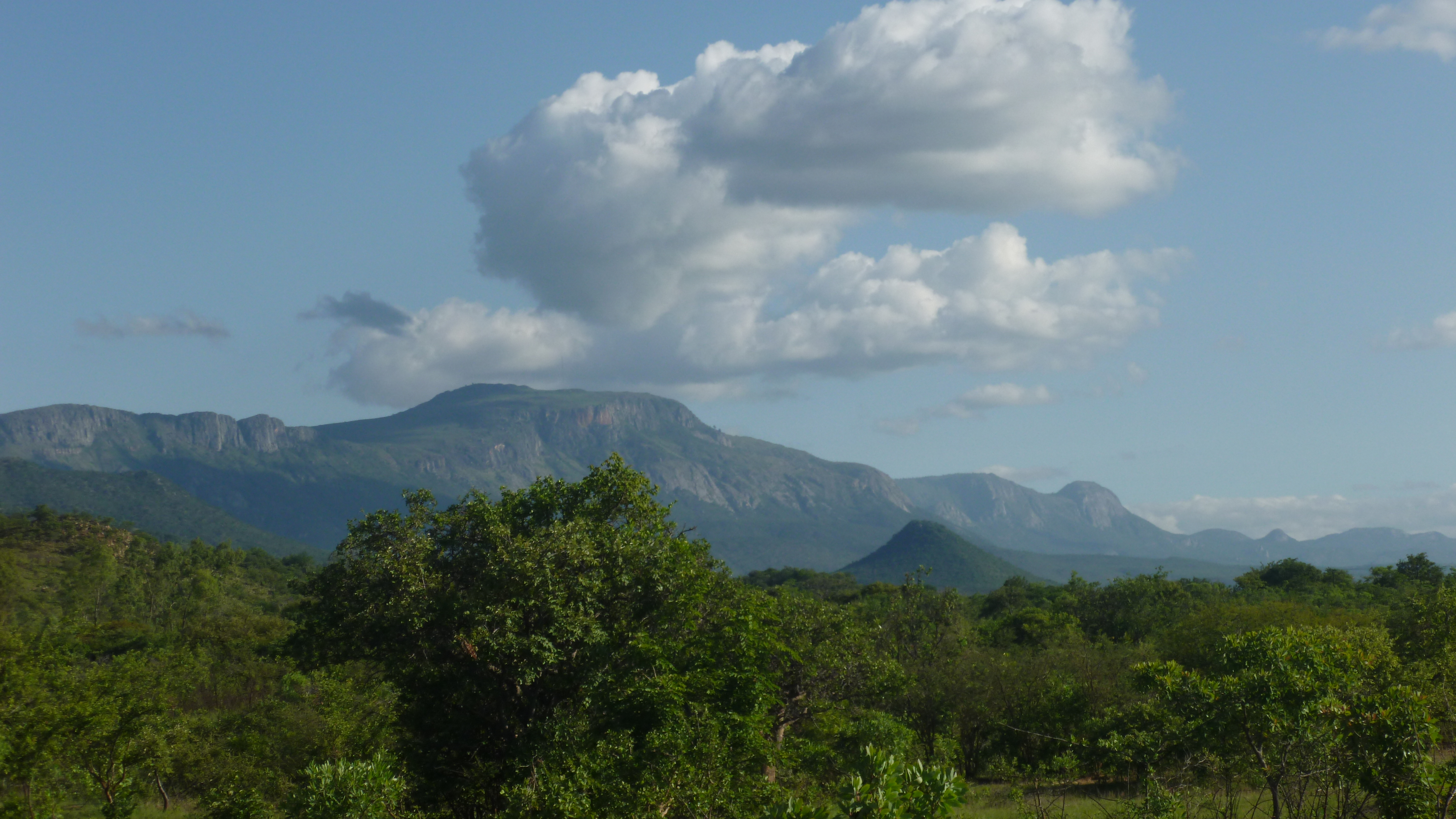
Eastern Highlands looking south towards Nyanga

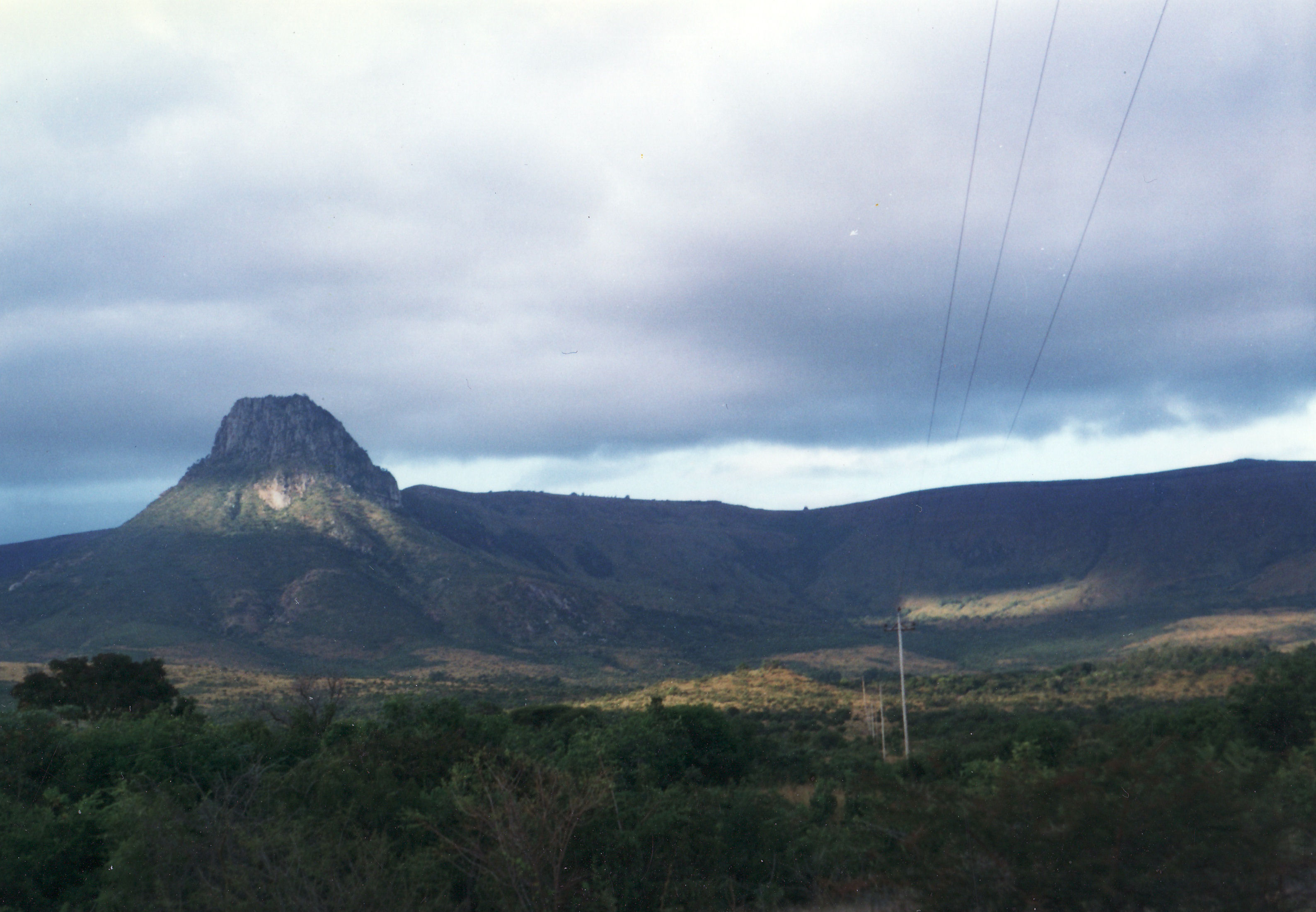
Mt. Mozi is a prominent peak at the Northern limit of the range

The Eastern Highlands, also known as the Manica Highlands, is a mountain range on the border of Zimbabwe and Mozambique. The Eastern Highlands extend north and south for about 300 kilometres (190 mi) through Zimbabwe's Manicaland Province and Mozambique's Manica Province.

The Highlands are home to the Eastern Zimbabwe montane forest-grassland mosaic ecoregion. The ecoregion includes the portion of the highlands above 1,000 meters elevation, including the Inyangani Mountains, Bvumba Mountains, Chimanimani Mountains, Chipinge Uplands, and the isolated Mount Gorongosa further east in Mozambique. The Southern miombo woodlands ecoregion lies at lower elevations to the east and west of the highlands.

The highlands have a cooler, moister climate than the surrounding lowlands, which support distinct communities of plants and animals. The ecoregion is home to several plant communities: submontane and montane grasslands, moist evergreen forest, dry montane forest, miombo woodlands, and heathlands.

== Geography ==
The highlands consist of three main mountain groups – the Nyanga, Bvumba, and Chimanimani mountains – and several smaller ranges. The mountains are mostly sparsely populated, covered in rich grasslands, shrublands, woodlands and forests.

The Nyanga Mountains in the north contain Zimbabwe's highest mountain Mount Nyangani (2,592 m), and Mutarazi Falls, Africa's second-longest waterfall. The Choa Mountains rise northeast of the Nyanga mountains in Mozambique. Zimbabwe's agricultural Honde Valley lies southeast of the Nyanga range, and leads into Mozambique.

Mutare is the largest city in the highlands. It is located on the Zimbabwean side of the Mutare Gap, a saddle between the Nyanga and Bvumba mountains. The main east-west road through the highlands is the A3 (Zimbabwe) - N6 (Mozambique), which connects the port of Beira in Mozambique to Zimbabwe's capital Harare via Chimoio, Manica, and Mutare, with a border crossing at Machipanda. The Beira–Bulawayo railway also crosses the highlands at Machipanda.

The Bvumba Mountains are centrally situated south of Mutare. They lie mostly in Zimbabwe, but a northeastern spur, Monte Vumba, reaches into Mozambique. Agricultural Burma Valley lies south and east of the Bvumba Mountains.

South of Burma Valley, the Tsetsera, Gweni, and Tandara plateaus lie along the border, separated by east-west river valleys lying in fault rifts.

The Chimanimani Mountains lie south of the Mussapa Pequeno River, which divides them from the Tandara plateau. The Chimanimani range consists of a high plateau with several ridges running north and south. Monte Binga on the border is the highest peak in Mozambique and the second-highest in Zimbabwe. Mussapa Gap is a pass through the mountains that follows the eastward-flowing Mussapa Grande River and westward-flowing Nyanyadzi River. Mussapa Gap was an important trade and migration route through the highlands for centuries.

The Rusitu-Tanganda fault, an east-west rift that carries the eastward-flowing Rusitu River and the westward flowing Tanganda River, marks the southern end of the Chimanimani Mountains. A hilly upland extends south from the fault into Chipinge District, and the highest point is Mount Selinda at 1230 meters.

The Eastern Highlands are part of the East African Highlands, one of four distinct physiographic divisions on the African continent. The East African Highlands physiographic division consists of the East African Rift and Abyssinian physiographic provinces, part of the long chain of mountains that runs down East Africa. The mountains and mountain ranges that make up the East African Highlands share many common plant and animal species and communities, known as Afromontane flora and fauna.

== Climate ==
The Highlands have a more equable climate than Zimbabwe's central plateau, with higher rainfall, low cloud and heavy mists and dew as moisture moves inland from the Indian Ocean. Many streams and rivers originate in these mountains. The northern portion is drained by tributaries of the Zambezi River, while the southern portion is drained by tributaries of the Save River. The eastern slope is drained by Mozambique's Buzi and Pungwe rivers.

== Flora ==
Much of the small area consists of rolling hills covered with grassland, which are renewed annually following the fires that occur at the end of the dry season. At lower elevations, Themeda triandra is the predominant grass on the more fertile red soils, and Loudetia simplex is common on less-fertile white sandy soils. At higher elevations are montane grasslands made up mostly of short, tufted grasses, including Loudetia simplex, Trachypogon spicatus, Exotheca abyssinica, and Monocymbium ceresiiforme.

Some valleys and east-facing slopes contain areas of subtropical rainforest, with a high canopy, lianas, and a rich undergrowth. There are larger areas of dry forest at higher altitudes in places where the ground is well watered and on drier slopes patches of miombo woodland (Brachystegia spiciformis, Brachystegia tamarindoides and Uapaca kirkiana) and areas of heathland at higher elevations. There are patches of the tall, evergreen mobola plum Parinari curatellifolia near the town of Chipinge and on the western slopes of the Nyanga Highlands.

In the Chimanimani Mountains and Mount Gorongosa, heathlands are found on poor, acidic sandy soils derived from quartzite. The heathlands are of two types, ericaceous and proteaceous. The ericaceous heathlands are dominated by Erica mannii, Erica hexandra, Phylica ericoides, Passerina montana, Erica pleiotricha, Erica lanceolifera, and Erica johnstoniana. Protea gazensis, Protea welwitschii, and Leucospermum saxosum are common in the proteaceous heathlands.

A number of indigenous monocot lilies with small distribution ranges occur in the highlands. Cryptostephanus vansonii, Cyrtanthus rhodesianus, and Scadoxus pole-evansii are popular with rare plant collectors.

== Fauna ==
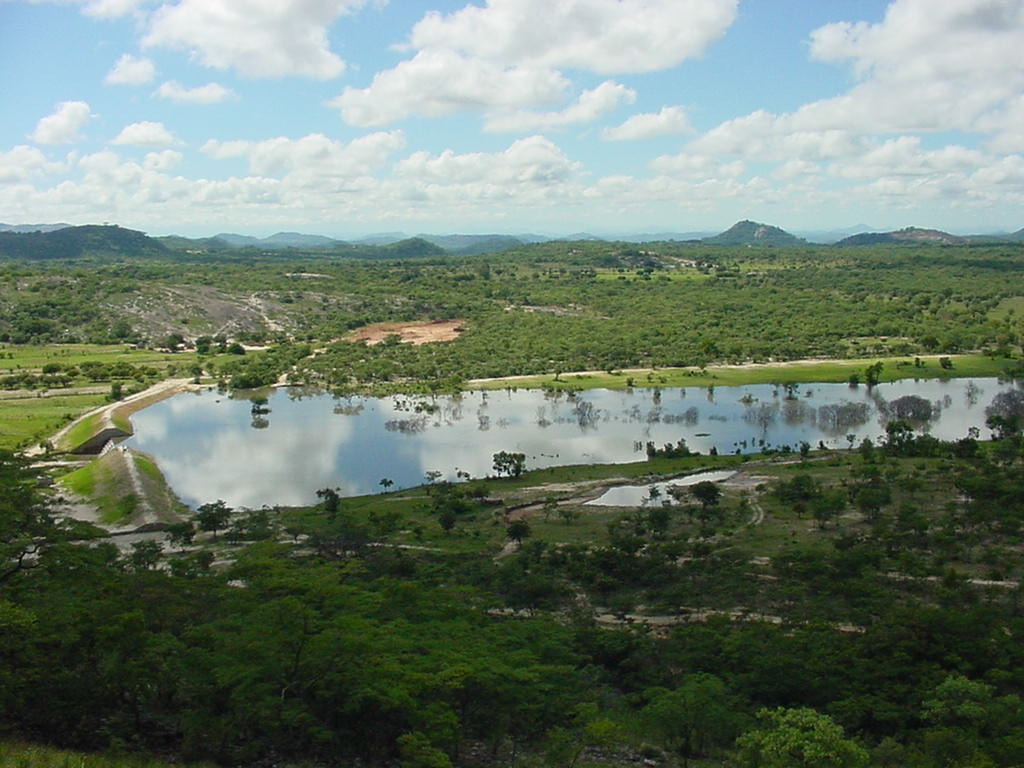
Lake at Mother of Peace orphanage in the Eastern Highlands

This variety of different types of habitat results in a richness of animal life too. Animals found in the highlands include Sykes' monkey (Cercopithecus albogularis), East African little collared fruit bat (Myonycteris relicta) and Marshall's pygmy chameleon (Rhampholeon marshalli). Many of its animals are found throughout East Africa.

The highlands are also rich in birdlife including trumpeter hornbill (Bycanistes bucinator), Livingstone's turaco (Tauraco livingstonii), purple-crested turaco (Tauraco porphyreolophus), crested guineafowl (Guttera pucherani) and crowned eagle (Stephanoaetus coronatus). Two species, the Chirinda apalis (Apalis chirindensis) and Roberts's warbler (Oreophilais robertsi), are endemic to the Eastern Highlands. The Chirinda apalis lives deep in the evergreen forests, while Roberts's warbler inhabits the forest edge.

The forests are also full of butterflies, most notably swallowtails such as the emperor swallowtail (Papilio ophidicephalus) and the citrus swallowtail (Papilio demodocus) and the forest undergrowth in particular shelters a variety of reptiles including skinks, geckos, lizards, frogs, toads, and snakes.

== Freshwater ==
Numerous streams have their headwaters in the Eastern Highlands. Over time streams have deeply dissected the highlands, forming deep ravines and gorges. Some eastward-flowing streams form high waterfalls as they descend the escarpment into Mozambique.

The highlands' cool, high-altitude, rapidly-flowing streams create aquatic habitats distinct from the surrounding lowlands, and the highlands are home to several endemic species. Four species of fish – Labeo baldasseronii, Amarginops hildae, Varicorhinus pungweensis, and Parakneria mossambica – are endemic to the highlands.

== Threats and preservation ==
The mountain forests are vulnerable to logging and the grasslands susceptible to fire and the rainforests, which by definition grow on well-watered fertile land, to clearance for agriculture. The moist climate is ideal for planting tea, coffee and hardwoods. However, much of the original vegetation remains, especially at higher altitudes, which are not suitable for farming.

Large areas of the highlands are protected, including Nyanga National Park in the Nyanga Mountains, Bunga Forest Botanical Reserve in the Bvumba Mountains, and Zimbabwe's 171 km^{2} Chimanimani National Park and Mozambique's Chimanimani National Reserve in the Chimanimani Mountains. The Chimanimani park and reserve together form the core of the Chimanimani Transfrontier Conservation Area.

== See also ==
- Zimbabwean Plateau
- Nyanga National Park
- Mutarazi Falls
