= Chimanimani Mountains =

Mountain range in Mozambique and Zimbabwe

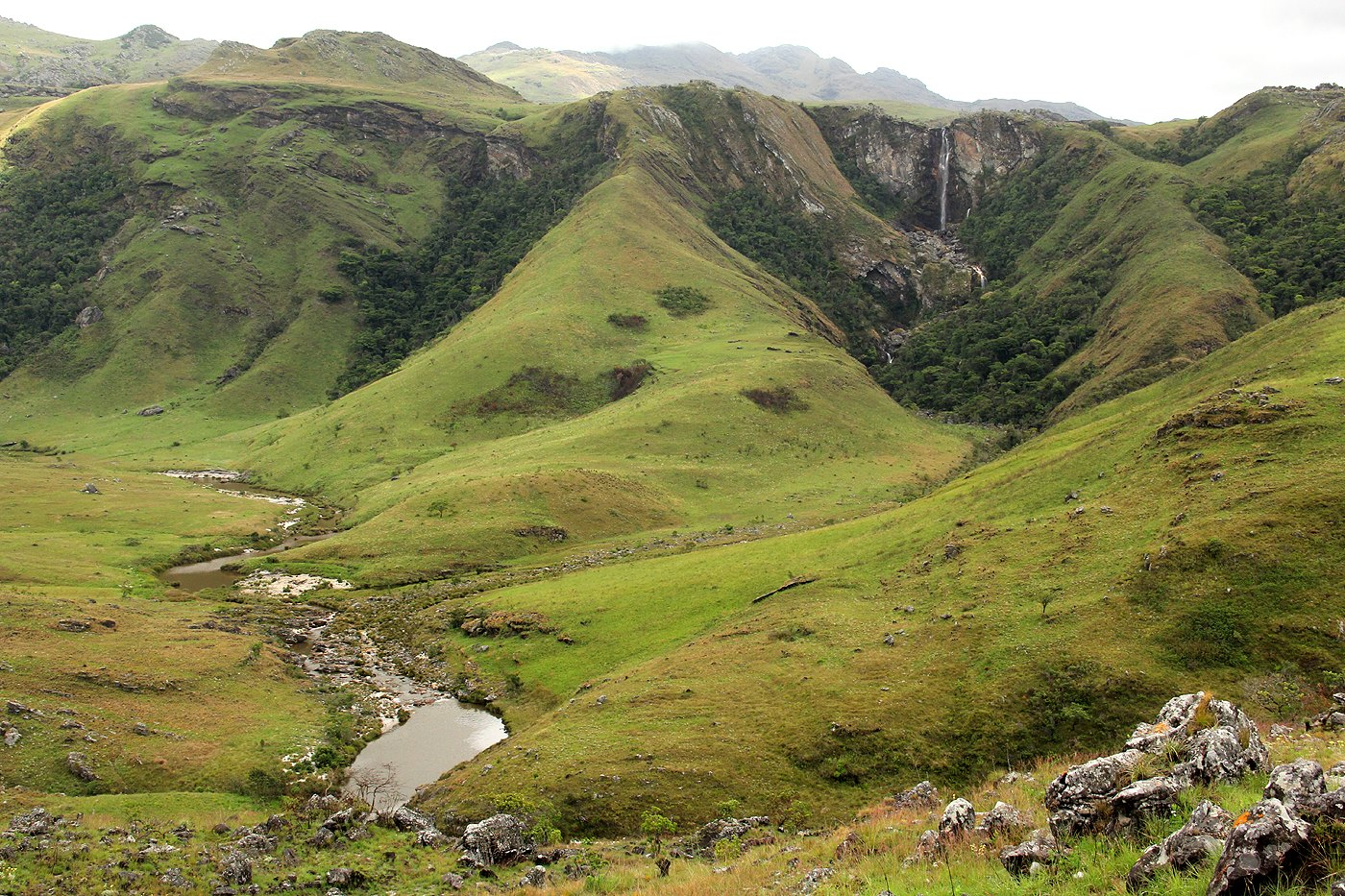
Tucker's Falls in the Chimanimani Mountains, Mozambique

The Chimanimani Mountains are a mountain range on the border of Zimbabwe and Mozambique. The mountains are in the southern portion of the Eastern Highlands, or Manica Highlands, a belt of highlands that extend north and south along the international border, between the Zambezi and Save rivers.

The Chimanimani Mountains include Monte Binga (2,436 m), the highest peak in Mozambique and the second-highest in Zimbabwe. The mountains are home to diverse forests, savannas, montane grasslands, and heathlands. Zimbabwe's Chimanimani National Park and Mozambique's adjacent Chimanimani National Reserve protect parts of the range. These two parks, together with a larger buffer zone, constitute the Chimanmani Transfrontier Conservation Area.

== Geography ==
Much of the range is composed of quartzite ridges running north and south, with Monte Binga (2,436 m) as the highest point. Other peaks include Mt. Peza (2152 m), Mt. Dombe (2188 m), and Mawenje or Turret Towers (2362 m) in Zimbabwe, and Mt. Nhamadimo (2144 m) in Mozambique. The mountains are drained by tributaries of the Buzi River, including the Rusitu (called the Lucite in Mozambique) and the Mussapa.

The mountains are in Chimanimani District of Zimbabwe's Manicaland Province, and Sussundenga District of Mozambique's Manica Province.

== Climate ==
The mountains rise out of the low Mozambican plain, and the eastward-facing slopes intercept moisture-laden winds from the Indian Ocean, creating much orographic precipitation. There are no weather stations in the wetter Mozambican portion of the range. The western slopes on the Zimbabwean side of the range are in the mountains' rain shadow, and generally drier. Zimbabwean stations at Chimanimani and Chisengu reported 1,074 mm and 1,406 mm, respectively.

The summer rainy season extends from November to late March or April. Above 1500 meters elevation rain can fall in any season, and frequent mists and overcast days during the dry season reduce stress on plants.

The mean average temperature ranges from 22º C in the southeastern lowlands to less than 18º C in the high mountains. Frosts occur above 1500 meters in elevation.

== Ecology ==
The mountains above 1000 meters are part of the Eastern Zimbabwe montane forest-grassland mosaic ecoregion.

=== Montane plant communities ===
Montane plant communities (generally above 1000 meters elevation) include grassland, scrub (shrublands), woodland, forest, and lithophytic vegetation. The Chimanimani Mountains' montane plant communities are Afromontane, and share many species with other high-elevation mountain regions scattered from South Africa to Ethiopia. 70 montane plant species are endemic to the Chimanimani Mountains.

==== Grasslands ====
Grassland is most widespread vegetation, found on level and rolling terrain. Grasslands are of three main types - quartzite grasslands, schist grasslands, and wet or hydromorphic grasslands. The quartzite and schist grassland types are determined by the underlying geology.

The quartzite grasslands generally grow low, with tufted grasses. Common grasses are Loudetia simplex, Sporobolus festivus, Panicum brazzavillense, Elionurus muticus, Monocymbium ceresiiforme, Panicum ecklonii, Rhytachne rottboellioides and Trachypogon spicatus. Quartzite grasslands cover an area of 50 to 100 km^{2}.

Schist grasslands grow on soils derived from schist, which are generally red in color and deeper and more nutrient-rich than quartzite-derived soils. Schist grasslands grow taller and denser, with Themeda triandra as the dominant grass, along with the grasses Loudetia simplex, Tristachya hispida, Monocymbium ceresiiforme'', and the sedge Bulbostylis contexta. The shrubs Protea afra subsp. gazensis, Indigofera cecilii, and Myrica chimanimaniana and the bracken fern Pteridium aquilinum are also typical. Schist grasslands cover an area of approximately 150 km^{2}.

==== Shrublands ====
Shrublands grow on steeper slopes, are of two main types, Ericaceous and Proteaceous.

Ericaceous scrub is found on quartite-derived soils above 1200 meters elevation. It is characterized by shrubs in the heath family Ericaceae, including Erica hexandra, E. simii, E. pleiotricha, E. johnstonii, and E. lanceolifera. The ericaceous scrubland includes many other species, including many of the species endemic to the Eastern Highlands and Chimanimani Mountains.

Proteaceous scrub is found on schist-derived soils between 1100 and 1800 meters elevation, interspersed with schist grasslands. Dominant shrubs are from the protea family (Proteaceae), including Protea afra, P. welwitschii, P. wentzeliana, and Leucospermum saxosum, together with smaller shrubs, herbs, and grasses.

Other shrubland types are mixed sclerophyll scrub, which contains a mix of Ericaceous and Proteaceous species, and bracken scrub, characterized by the bracken fern Pteridium aquilinum together with shrubs and tall grasses. Bracken scrub is found on richer soils near forest patches.

==== Woodlands ====
The mountains are home to three types of miombo woodland. Trees are generally 4 to 8 meters high, with 20 to 60% canopy cover, with grasses and bracken covering the ground.

Mzhenje (Uapaca kirkiana) woodland is found on east-facing slopes below 1200 meters elevation, typically on schist-derived soils. Mzhenge is accompanied by the trees Brachystegia utilis, Pterocarpus angolensis, and Pericopsis angolensis at lower elevations.

Msasa (Brachystegia spiciformis) woodland is also found on schist soils. Trees tend to grow low (2 to 4 meters high) and widely scattered at higher elevations. At lower elevations the trees grow higher and closer, and Uapaca kirkiana and Faurea saligna accompany msasa.

Woodland of Brachystegia tamarindoides subsp. microphylla grows on quartzite outcrops and rocky slopes. The trees grow low and spreading, and are draped with tassels of Usnea lichen.

==== Forests ====
Montane forests occur in scattered patches, typically in sheltered areas with access to year-round moisture. Small patches of 1 to 5 hectares are most common, with patches up to 30 km in some locations. The largest patch discovered by Timberlake et al. was 240 hectares, on a west-facing slope above the Nyahedzi River.

Trees form a closed canopy 10 to 15 meters high. Lianas and epiphytes are common in the canopy, and the understory plants are mostly ferns and mosses. Common forest trees include Neocussonia umbellifera, Ilex mitis, Macaranga mellifera, Maesa lanceolata, Myrica pilulifera, Podocarpus milanjianus, and Syzygium cordatum. Widdringtonia nodiflora occurs in drier patches.

A transitional forest type can be found on the edges of forest patches, and along streams and gullies in grassland and shrubland areas, and includes a mix of forest and Ericaceous shrub species, together with grasses and bracken ferns. The transitional forests include the large shrubs and small trees Erica mannii, Englerophytum magalismontanum, Rapanea melanophloeos, and Myrsine africana. Groves of the large banana-like shrub Strelitzia caudata and the tree fern Cyathea capensis grow in sheltered stream-side locales surrounded by more open vegetation.

== History ==
The Ndau people have lived in the area around the Chimanimani Mountains for centuries. In the early 19th century, Nguni-speaking people left what is now South Africa to settle in the Save River valley. The Nguni leader Soshangane founded the Gaza Empire, which subjugated the area from the Limpopo to the Zambezi rivers, including the local Ndau people. In the late 19th century the Gaza Empire came into conflict with European colonial empires – the British expanding north from South Africa, and the Portuguese expanding from the coast of Mozambique into the interior.

The Anglo-Portuguese Treaty of 1891 fixed the boundary between the United Kingdom's and Portugal's colonial possessions in southern and eastern Africa, and divided the Chimanimani mountains between the British Southern Rhodesia colony and Portugal's Mozambique colony. Differing interpretations of the treaty language by the governments of the UK and Portugal revived the boundary dispute, and settlement of the boundary between the Zambezi and Save rivers was arbitrated by Paul Honoré Vigliani, an assistant to the King of Italy. The arbitration was completed on January 30 1897, establishing the international boundary which has persisted until the present day. The new boundary split the Ndau communities who live on either side of it.

The government of Southern Rhodesia established Chimanimani National Park in 1949, with an original area of 82 km^{2}. The park was later expanded to 155 km^{2}. In 1953, the colonial government of Mozambique gazetted the forest reserves of Maronga, Zomba, and Moribane on the mountains' southeastern slope. Both colonial governments also expanded logging and agriculture during the 1940s and 50s. Southern Rhodesia's forestry department and private companies created extensive plantations of pine, wattle, and Eucalyptus in the mountains and valleys west of the National Park boundary. The Mozambican colonial government established sawmills and timber concessions in the lower-elevation forests and dense woodlands southeast of the mountains.

Mozambique became independent from Portugal in 1975, but suffered a civil war from 1977 to 1992. Southern Rhodesia declared independence as Rhodesia under an exclusive white-minority government in 1965. The Rhodesian Bush War, or Zimbabwe Independence War, raged from 1964 to 1979.

During the war, mountain passes in the Chimanimani area were frequently used by guerilla fighters moving between Zimbabwe and their camps in Mozambique, and the guerrillas laid mines along local roads to disrupt the local economy. The passes were heavily mined by Rhodesian government forces to prevent guerilla movements. In 1980, a settlement was reached which gave the country's black majority full political participation, and the country was renamed Zimbabwe. Decades later land mines remain a hazard in the area, particularly after heavy rain.

In 2003, the Mozambican government created Chimanimani National Reserve, with an area 640.6 km^{2} that encompasses the high mountains on the Mozambican side.
