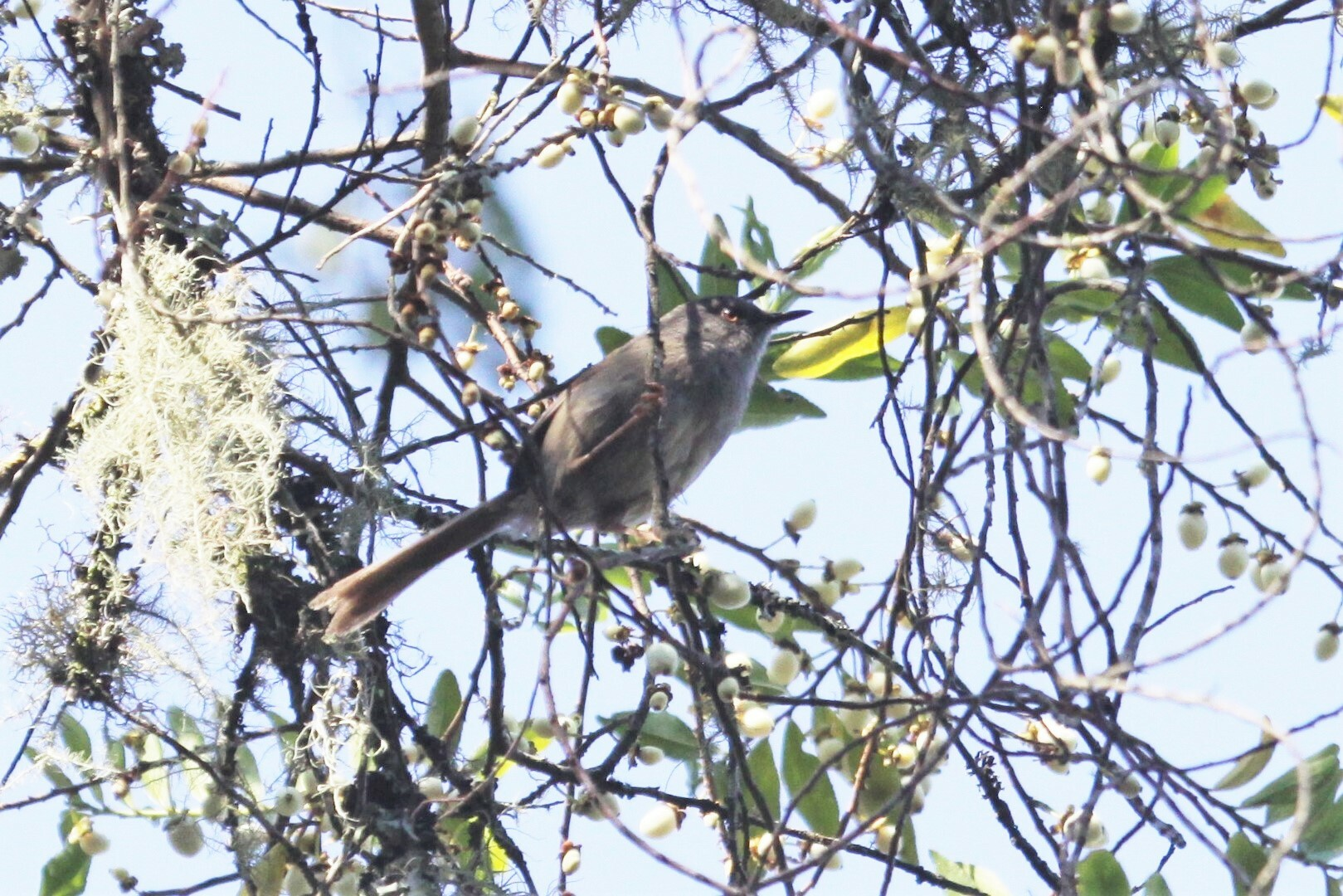

Conservation status
- Least Concern (IUCN 3.1)

Scientific classification
- Kingdom: Animalia
- Phylum: Chordata
- Class: Aves
- Order: Passeriformes
- Family: Cisticolidae
- Genus: Oreophilais; Clancey, 1991
- Species: O. robertsi

Binomial name
- Oreophilais robertsi (Benson, 1946)
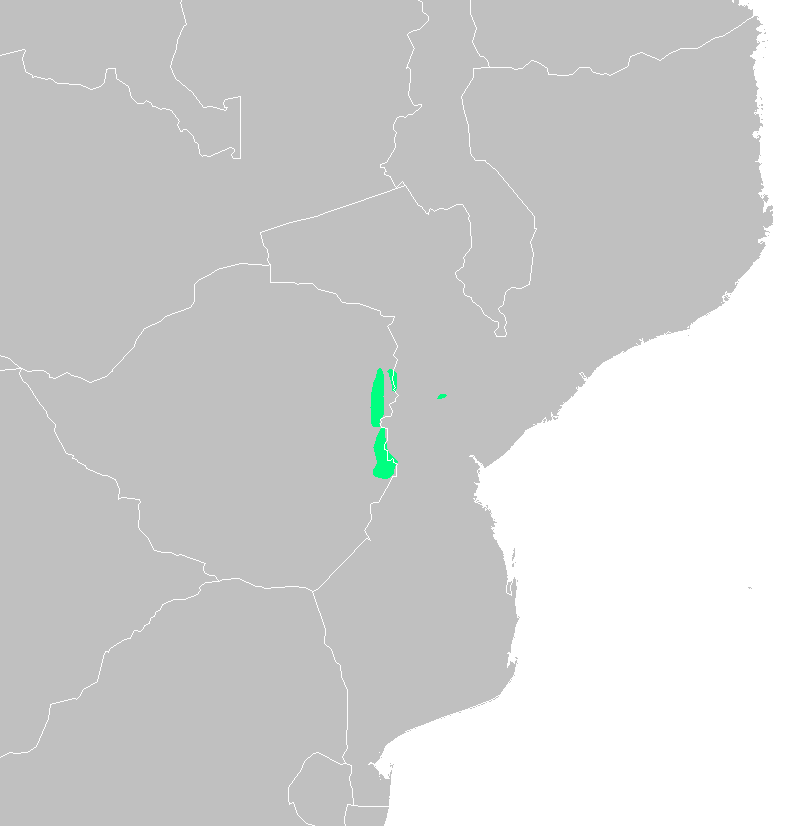
- general range: the montane forest-grassland mosaic

Synonyms
- Prinia robertsi Benson, 1946

= Roberts's warbler =

Species of bird

Roberts's warbler (Oreophilais robertsi), also known as Roberts' prinia, briar warbler or brier warbler, is a species of passerine bird belonging to the family Cisticolidae. This species is endemic to the Eastern Highlands of Zimbabwe and Mozambique. Its natural habitats are subtropical or tropical moist montane forest and subtropical or tropical moist shrubland. It is the only species in the genus Oreophilias.

== Taxonomy ==
Roberts's warbler was first formally described as Prinia robertsi in 1946 by the British ornithologist Constantine Walter Benson, although it had originally been identified as a distinct species at Mount Selinda by Charles Swynnerton in 1906. Benson gave the type locality as Vumba. In 1991 Phillip Clancey proposed the new monospecific genus Oreophilias as, among other features which differed, this species had 8 tail feathers rather than the 10 present in species in the genus Prinia. Clancey suggested that Oreophilias was a more basal taxon thena Prinia because of the lower number of rectrices. Roberts's warbler belongs to the family Cisticolidae, which includes the cisticolas, prinias, apalises, tailorbirds, eremomelas and other groups of "African" warblers, formerly classified within the Old World warbler family Sylviidae. The Cisticolidae is now classified in the superfamily Sylvioidea, part of the Corvides clade within the suborder Passeri in the order Passeriformes. This species is monotypic with no subspecies.

== Etymology ==
Roberts's warbler has the genus name Oreophiilias which Clancey explained as combining oreophil, being Greek meaning "mountain-loving", with lais, which is derived from hypolais, a small warbler-like songbird. The specific name honours the South African ornithologist Austin Roberts in recognition of his contribution to the ornithology of southern Africa.

== Description ==
Roberts's warbler resembles the related species in the genus Prinia in being long-tailed warbler-like birds. This species differs from that genus by 8 rather than 10 feathers in the tail which has a more stepped profile than the graduated profile of Prinia. It is a dark-grey warbler which bears the closest resemblance to is the tawny-flanked prinia (P. subflava) but differs in having a grey throat, pale eye and lake of brown edges to feathers of the upperparts. The upperpart of the head with the rest of the upperparts being dull olive brown, the flight feathers of the wing are dark brown and the tail is brown. The underparts are grey to rufous grey and are paler in the non breeding season and in the juveniles the eye is dark.. The length of Roberts's warbler is 13 to 14 cm (5.1 to 5.5 in).

== Distribution and habitat ==
Robert's warbler is endemic to the Eastern Highlands of Zimbabwe where it is found from the Chimanimani Mountains in the south to Nyanga in the north, typically at altitudes above 1,200 m (3,900 ft), where it appears to replace the tawny-flanked prinia, although the two species overlap with Roberts's warbler preferring denser cover than the prinia. Its range extends into adjacent parts of Mozambique but it has not been recorded from Mount Gorongosa. It prefers forest along streams, clearings, dense stands of bracken, Erica and briar (Smilax) along forest edges.

== Biology ==
Robert's warbler is frequently encountered in small parties of up to 10 birds foraging among the lower branches of the forest, among bracken and briars, these foraging parties often halt to chatter together and they keep in contact with a repetitive call, "nyerk-nyerk-nyerk", as well as buzzing notes. These vocalisations are rather babbler-like but are less guttural than the calls of babblers. It is an insectivorous species and may forage alone, as well as in the parties described above, and also in mixed species flocks. It has been recorded eating flies, beetles and grasshoppers.

It breeds between September and February, with most laying taking place in September. The nest is oval in shape with an entrance offset at the top and it is made from fine grasses and moss, held together with spider web and located about 1 m (3 ft 3 in) above the ground. The clutch consists of 2 or 3 turquoise eggs which are spotted with brown and lilac.

== Conservation status ==
Robert's warbler is classified as a species of Least Concern by the International Union for Conservation of Nature. It does have a restricted range but this does not seem to approach the thresholds for the species to be classified as Vulnerable. The population, although not know, is apparently stable and is thought to be large enough to justify its classification as Least Concern.
