= Disa chimanimaniensis =

Conservation status
- Least Concern (IUCN 3.1)

Scientific classification
- Kingdom: Plantae
- Clade: Tracheophytes
- Clade: Angiosperms
- Clade: Monocots
- Order: Asparagales
- Family: Orchidaceae
- Subfamily: Orchidoideae
- Genus: Disa
- Species: D. chimanimaniensis

Binomial name
- Disa chimanimaniensis (H.P.Linder) H.P.Linder

Synonyms
- Herschelia chimanimaniensis H.P.Linder; Herschelianthe chimanimaniensis (H.P.Linder) H.P.Linder

Species of flowering plant

Disa chimanimaniensis is a perennial plant and geophyte belonging to the genus Disa. The plant is native to Mozambique and Zimbabwe and occurs in the Chimanimani Mountains.
