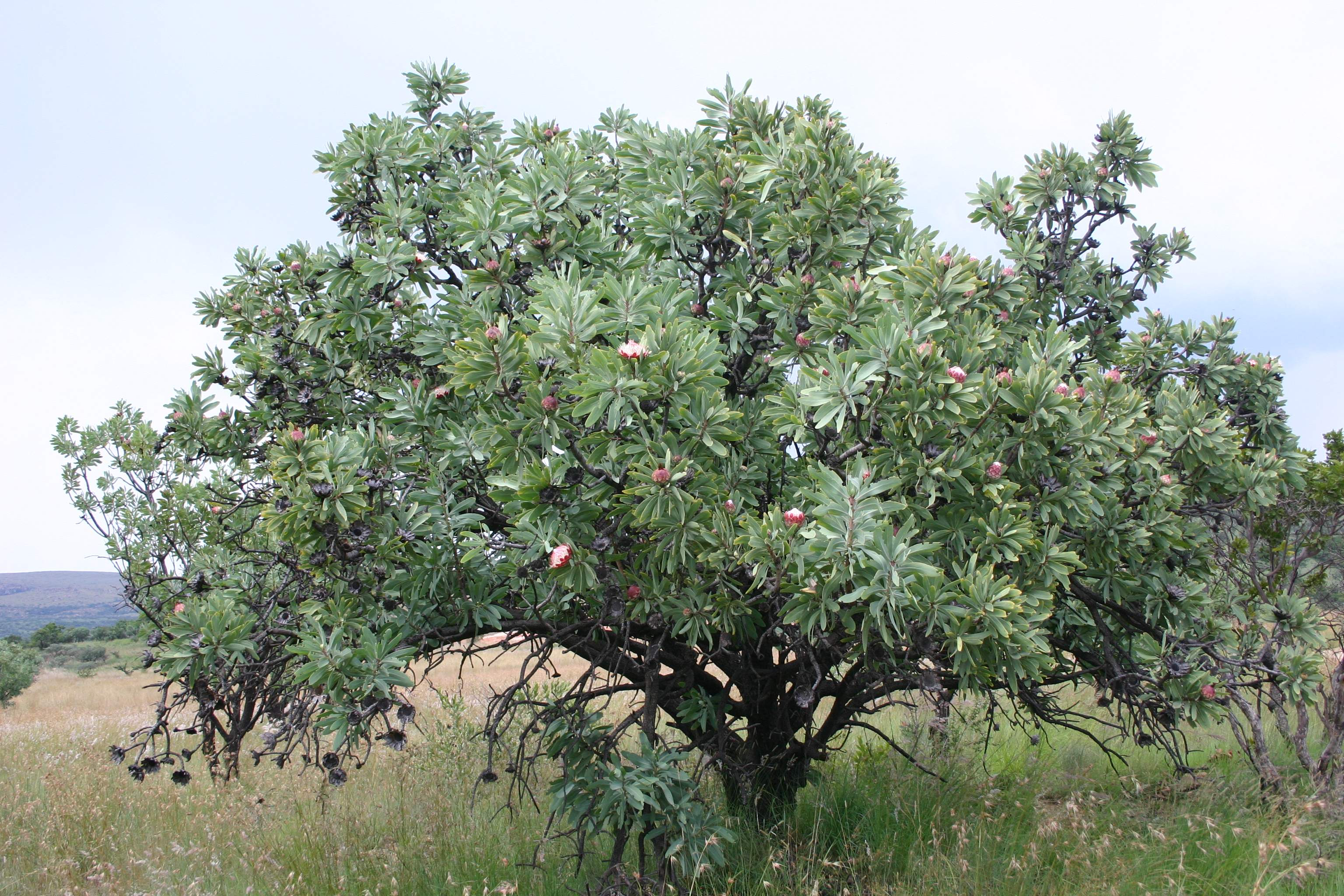

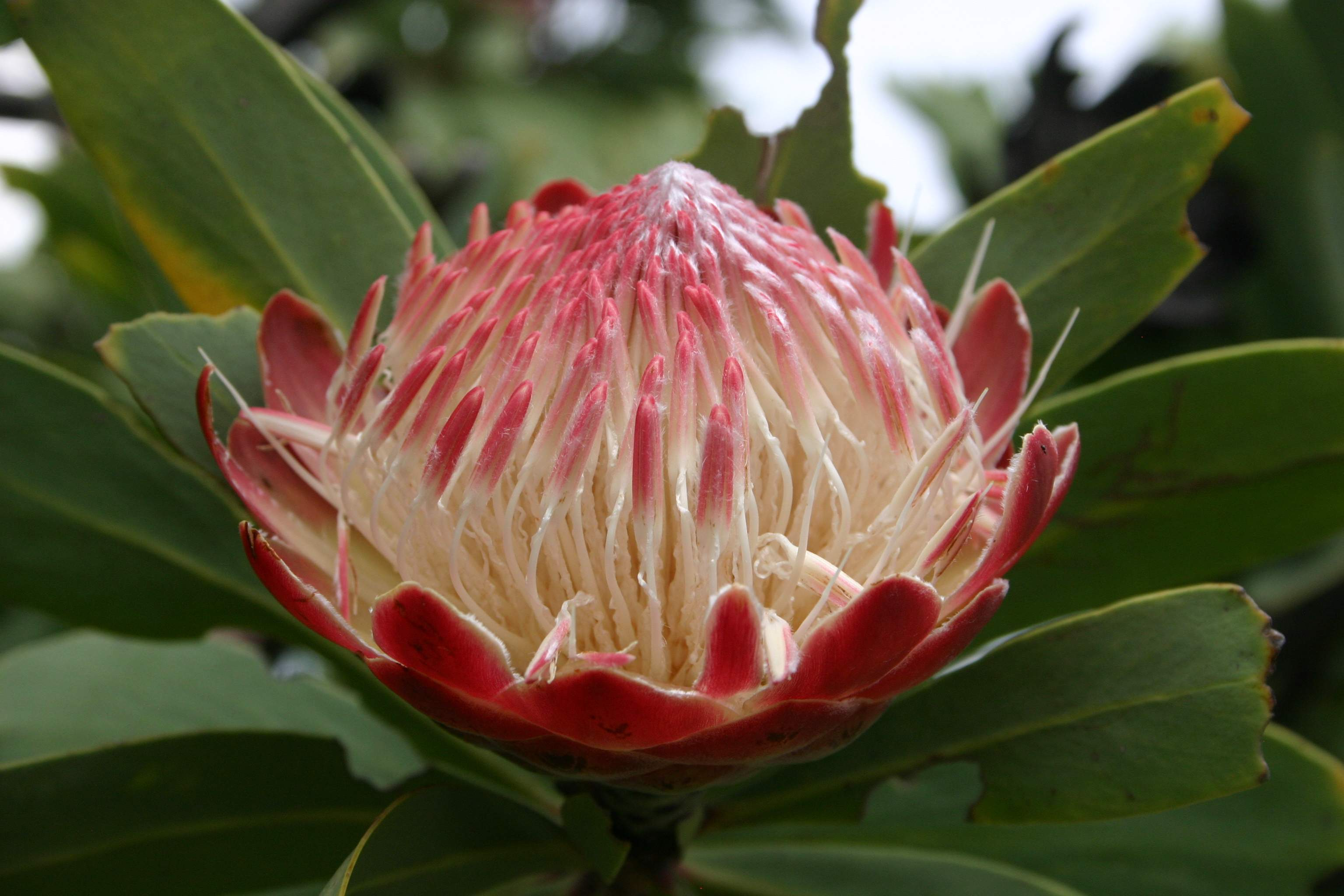

Conservation status
- Least Concern (IUCN 3.1)

Scientific classification
- Kingdom: Plantae
- Clade: Tracheophytes
- Clade: Angiosperms
- Clade: Eudicots
- Order: Proteales
- Family: Proteaceae
- Genus: Protea
- Species: P. afra

Binomial name
- Protea afra Meisn. 1856

Subspecies
- Protea afra subsp. afra; Protea afra subsp. gazensis (Beard) Chisumpa & Brummitt; Protea afra subsp. kilimandscharica (Engl.) Chisumpa & Brummitt; Protea afra subsp. nyasae (Rendle) Chisumpa & Brummitt
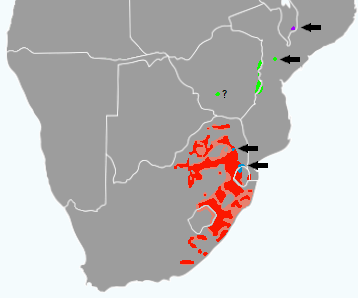
- Approximate range P. a. subsp. afra subsp. falcata subsp. gazensis subsp. nyasea

Synonyms
- Scolymocephalus afer (Meisn.) Kuntze

= Protea afra =

Species of African sugarbush

Protea afra (sometimes called the common protea), native to Africa, inhabiting from South Africa to Kenya, is a small tree or shrub which occurs in subtropical open or wooded grassland, usually on rocky ridges. Its leaves are leathery and hairless. The flower head is solitary or in clusters of 3 or 4 with the involucral bracts a pale red, pink or cream colour. The fruit is a densely hairy nut. The species is highly variable and has several subspecies.

Protea is a flowering plant genus in the family Proteaceae. The shrub was first discovered by Ferdinand Krauss in the eastern regions of South Africa in December/January 1839/40. P. afra has never attracted much attention from horticulturalists. It was induced to flower at Kew Gardens in May 1893, but this failed to kindle any further interest in the species. The plant was illustrated on the reverse of a South African coin called the "tickey", the equivalent of the British threepenny bit, for almost 30 years until the coin was withdrawn in 1961.

== Description ==
Upright shrub to small tree 1 – 4 m in height with a definite main stem up to 400mm in diameter, crown uneven and spreading. Bark black to dark brown with net-like fissures when mature. Leaves linear-elliptic to linear-falcate, narrow to broadly elliptic, narrow to broadly invert lanceolate, occasionally falcate; 70 – 250mm in length, 4 – 45mm wide, tips blunt to acuminate; smooth, leathery to thin and papery, light green to glaucous green, have a tendency to clump in each year's growth. Flowers carried at the end of leafy twigs 4 – 7 cm in diameter, usually singly but up to 4 heads may be grouped at the tip; globose to egg-shaped, broad and shallow when fully open, 45 – 80mm in diameter, base broad convex to flat, 20 – 30mm in diameter. Involucral bracts in 6 – 8 series; outer series broad oval to deltoid, 10 – 20mm wide, 5 – 7mm long, usually with silky silvery pelt of varying thickness at the distal ends but may be hairless, closely and densely shingled; inner series elongated to broadly elongated spatulate, 30 – 50mm long, 10 – 20mm wide, tips rounded to almost acuminate, slightly concave, smooth, varying in color from pale cream to brick red; very variable.

== Subspecies ==
- P. afra subsp. afra Meisn. — Katberg to Soutpansberg, South Africa, adjacent Lesotho and Eswatini
- P. afra subsp. falcata (Beard) M.Lötter — Limpopo and Mpumalanga escarpment, South Africa
- P. afra subsp. gazensis — eastern Zimbabwe and adjacent Mozambique
- P. afra subsp. kilimandscharica
- P. afra subsp. mafingensis — northern Malawi
- P. afra subsp. nyasea — endemic to Mount Mulanje, southern Malawi

== Habitat ==
Protea afra subsp. afra is widely distributed across the eastern reaches of South Africa (Gauteng, Kwazulu-Natal, Limpopo, Mpumalanga, the Eastern Cape as far south as the Katberg mountains) and Lesotho. It prefers poor, quartzitic, acidic soils, but is equally at home on a wide variety of well-drained soils and has even been found on alkaline dolomitic soils. It occurs from sea level to 2,100 m, always on southern slopes where the terrain is broken and rocky, or mountainous. It usually forms open stands in which it is the single large shrub or tree; these stands can cover large areas.

Protea afra subsp. gazensis occurs in the Eastern Highlands along the border of Mozambique and Zimbabwe, including the Nyanga Mountains and Chimanimani Mountains, and on Mount Gorongosa in Mozambique. It occurs in grasslands and shrublands from 1,500 to 2,100 meters elevation.

Protea afra is an exceptionally variable species, and seems to be composed of a mosaic of local races that exhibit small differences, usually in the size, colour, texture and shape of the leaves. Where winters are cold and dry the plant has stiff, thick, pale green leaves, while as the distribution moves westwards the leaves become larger, softer, darker and more pliant. The flowers are generally pinkish-red to carmine with green at the base, and are produced during a clearly defined 6 – 8 week period; this period may begin as early as October in coastal regions, and as late as December in higher regions. The flower heads produce a sweet, slightly sulphurous odour that attracts scarab beetles in large numbers. The dense, fissured bark provides the trees with a large measure of fire resistance. The bark can be used medicinally.

== Cultivation ==
A very hardy perennial shrub that will survive temperatures of at least −5 degrees Celsius. The seeds will germinate in the summer 22 days after planting, and the young plants will reach a height of 10 cm in their first year. Thereafter, growth can be somewhat variable with stops and starts. Should start to bloom from the 6th year, when lower branches should be pruned to stimulate the flowering shoots.

== Gallery ==
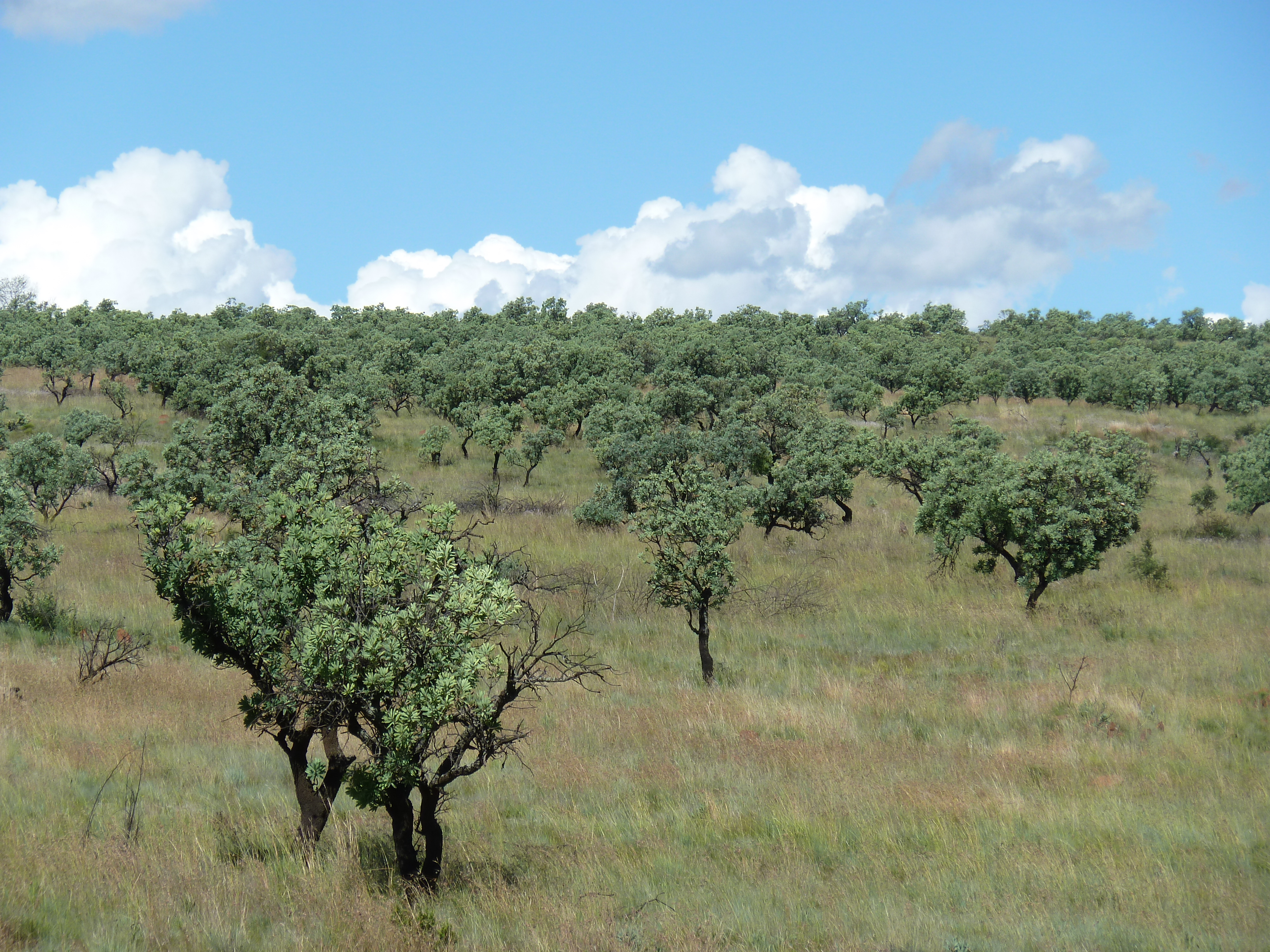
P. afra woodland

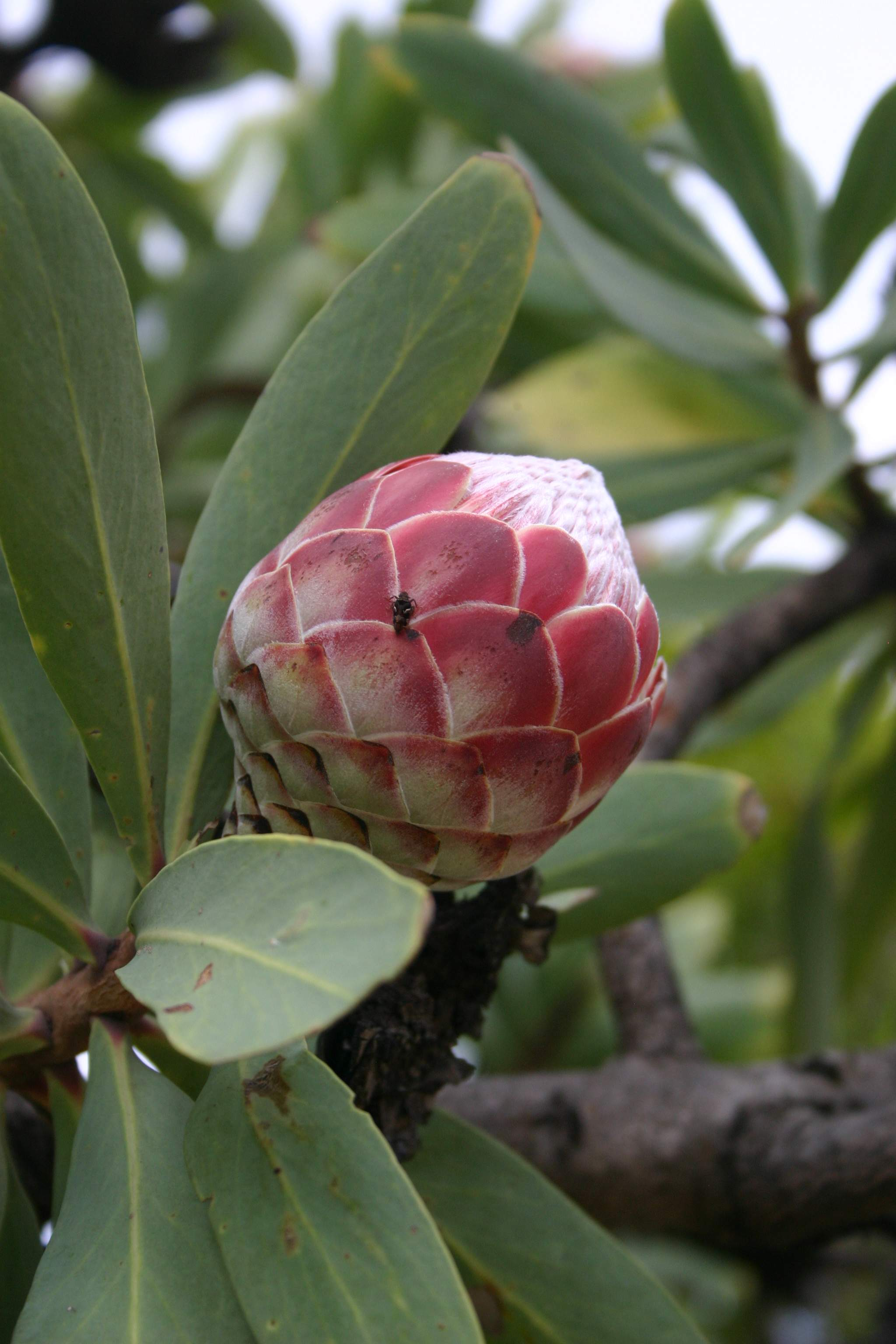
Flowerhead in bud

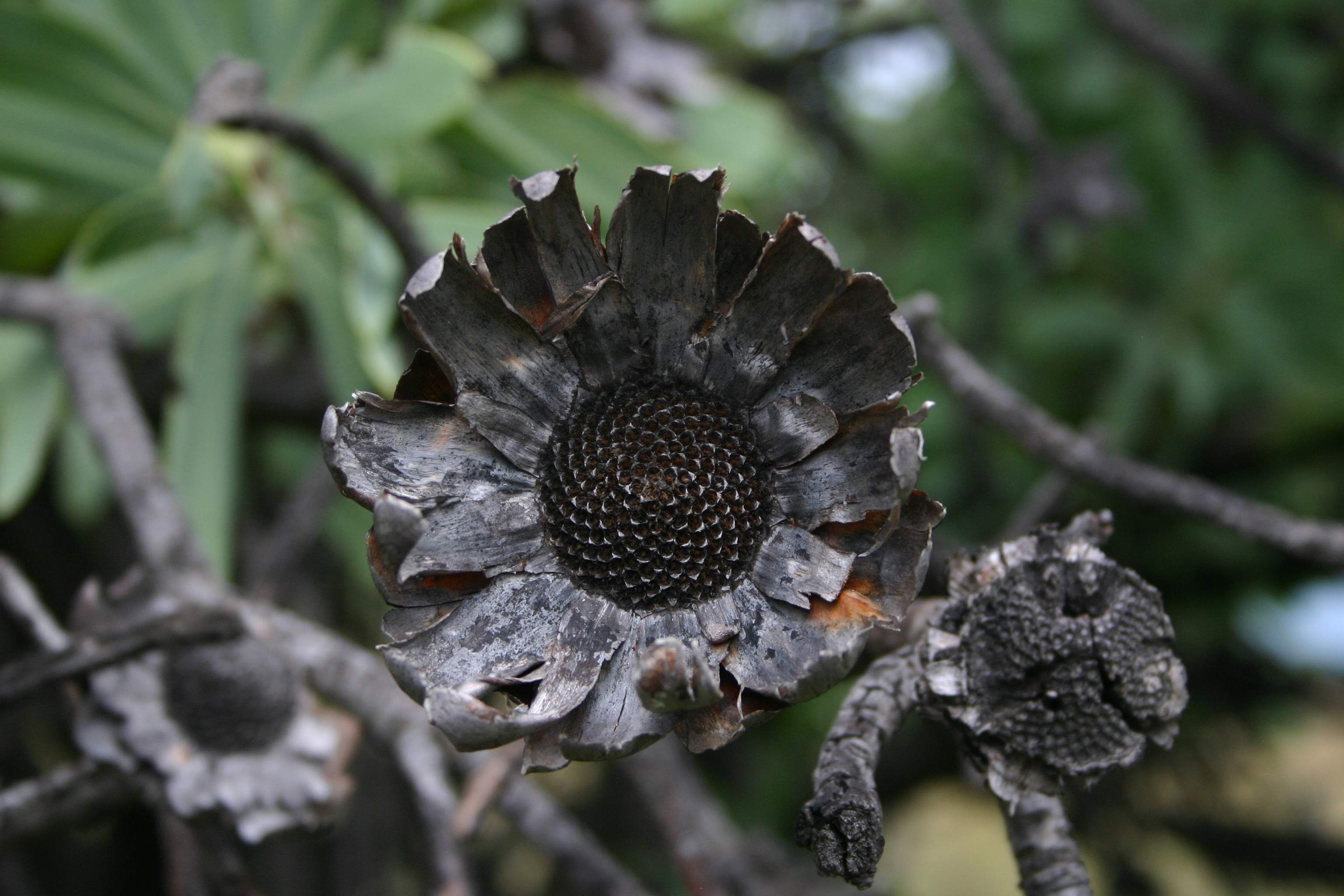
Old flower discs

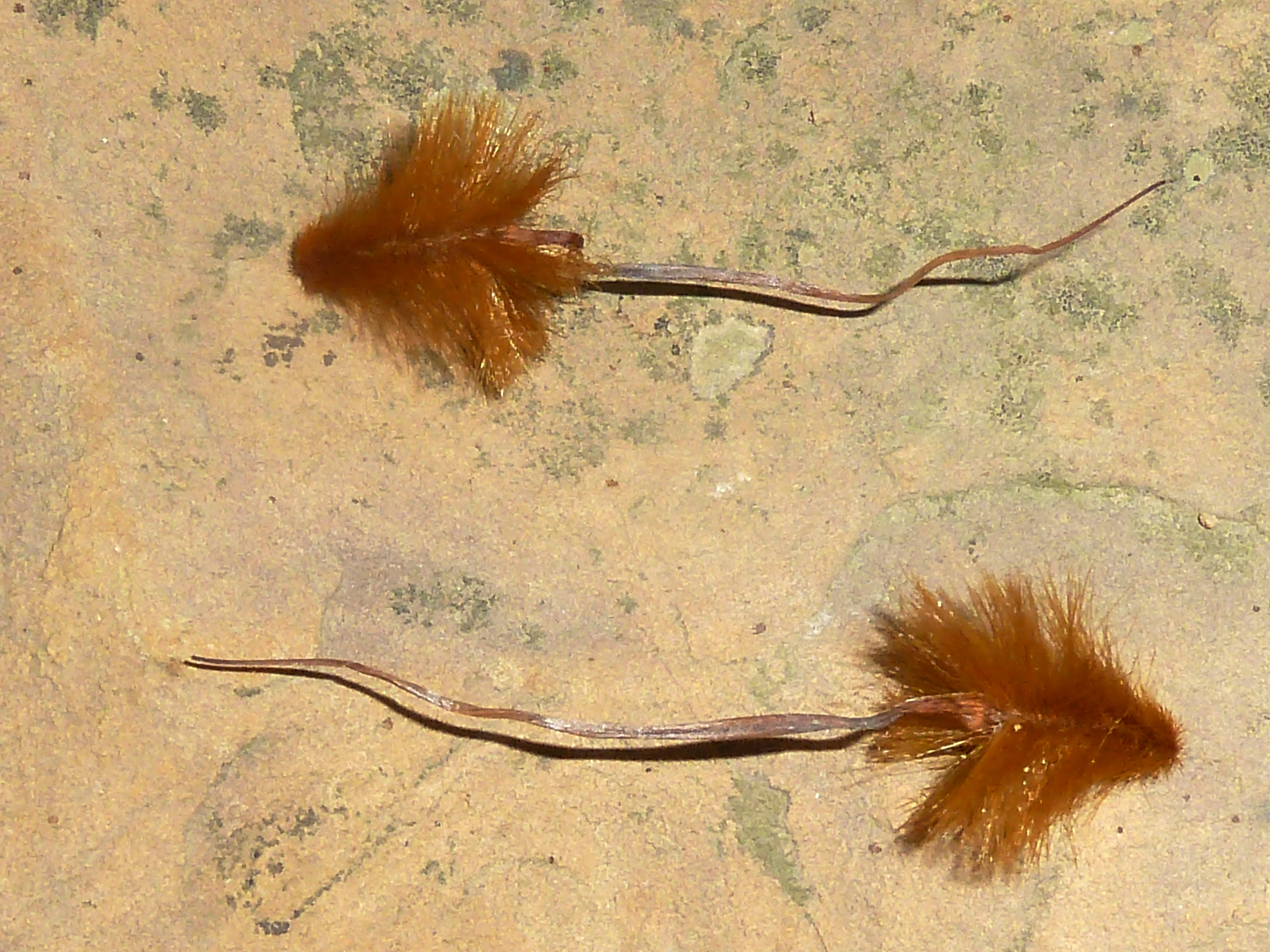
Seeds in winter

== Sources ==
- van Wyk, B. and van Wyk, P. 1997. Field Guide to trees of South Africa. Struik, Cape Town
- Pooley, E. 2005. A Field Guide to Wild Flowers of Kwazulu-Natal and the Eastern Region. National Floral Publications Trust, Durban
- Rourke, J. P. 1980. The Proteas of Southern Africa Tafelberg, Cape Town
- Roussouw, F. 1970. The Proteaceae of South Africa Purnell, Cape Town
