= Maronga Forest Reserve =

Protected area in Mozambique

- IUCN category IV (habitat/species management area)
- Area: 83.0 km^{2} (32.0 sq mi)
- Designation: Forest Reserve
- Designated: 1953
- Administrator: National Forestry Directorate (DINAF)

Maronga Forest Reserve is a protected area in Mozambique. It is located in foothills of the Chimanimani Mountains in Manica Province, adjacent to Chimanimani National Park and the border with Zimbabwe. The reserve is within the national park's designated buffer zone. It has an area of 83 km^{2}., and was established in 1953. Macurupini Falls is located in the reserve.

Much of the reserve is covered in miombo (Brachystegia spiciformis) woodland, with lowland moist evergreen forest in the northwestern portion of the reserve at the base of the Chimanimani Mountains.

Brachystegia spiciformis is the characteristic tree of the miombo woodlands, with Burkea africana sometimes co-dominant or dominant. Other common trees are Diplorhynchus condylocarpon, Maprounea africana, Millettia stuhlmannii, Pterocarpus angolensis. and Uapaca kirkiana.

Moist evergreen forest covers about 200 ha of the reserve, and extends across the border into Zimbabwe. Newtonia buchananii is the predominant forest canopy tree. Other common canopy trees are Maranthes goetzeniana, Xylopia aethiopica, Erythrophleum sp. and Khaya anthotheca. The evergreen forest is home to over 50 species of orchids, mainly epiphytes, and 45 species of ferns.
