= Brachystegia bakeriana =

Conservation status
- Least Concern (IUCN 3.1)

Scientific classification
- Kingdom: Plantae
- Clade: Tracheophytes
- Clade: Angiosperms
- Clade: Eudicots
- Clade: Rosids
- Order: Fabales
- Family: Fabaceae
- Genus: Brachystegia
- Species: B. bakeriana

Binomial name
- Brachystegia bakeriana Burtt Davy & Hutch.

Species of legume

Brachystegia bakeriana is a species of plant in the family Fabaceae. It is found in Angola and Zambia. It is threatened by habitat loss.

== Taxonomy ==
The Latin specific epithet bakeriana is in honor of the English botanist Edmund Gilbert Baker.
