= Brachystegia angustistipulata =

Conservation status
- Vulnerable (IUCN 3.1)

Scientific classification
- Kingdom: Plantae
- Clade: Tracheophytes
- Clade: Angiosperms
- Clade: Eudicots
- Clade: Rosids
- Order: Fabales
- Family: Fabaceae
- Genus: Brachystegia
- Species: B. angustistipulata

Binomial name
- Brachystegia angustistipulata De Wild.

Synonyms
- Brachystegia longifoliolata De Wild.

Species of legume

Brachystegia angustistipulata is a species of plant in the family Fabaceae. It is found in Democratic Republic of the Congo and Tanzania.
