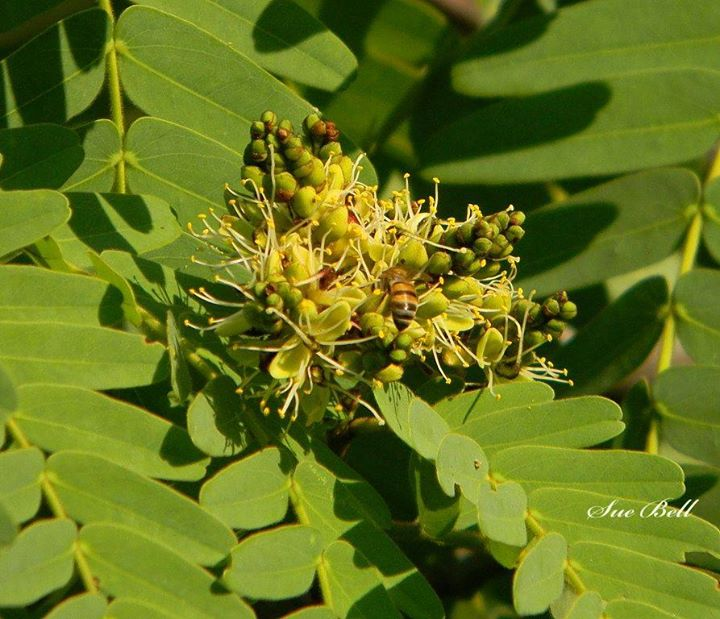
- B. boehmii inflorescence and foliage

Scientific classification
- Kingdom: Plantae
- Clade: Tracheophytes
- Clade: Angiosperms
- Clade: Eudicots
- Clade: Rosids
- Order: Fabales
- Family: Fabaceae
- Genus: Brachystegia
- Species: B. boehmii

Binomial name
- Brachystegia boehmii Taub.

Synonyms
- Brachystegia flagristipulata Taub.; Brachystegia filiformis Burtt Davy & Hutch.; Brachystegia woodiana Harms

= Brachystegia boehmii =

Mufuti

Species of legume

Brachystegia boehmii, named after the 19th-century German naturalist and collector Richard Böhm, is a deciduous, flat-topped tree with a spreading crown, native to eastern and southern Africa.

== Range ==
It forms an important component of miombo woodland, and occurs in Angola, Botswana, Democratic Republic of the Congo, Malawi, Mozambique, Zimbabwe, and Zambia. Common names are machabel (Mashonaland), mufuti (Zimbabwe) and Prince of Wales feathers. Occurring in the altitude range 900 – 1600 m.

== Habit and physical features ==
It grows up to 15 m tall, and has glabrous or pubescent young branchlets. Its long, pendulous, tufted leaves are some 35 cm long, with 15−30 pairs of leaflets, the middle pair measuring 30−65 x 7−18 mm. Upper and lower surfaces are more or less concolorous. New spring foliage is pink to brick-red, turning buff or yellow to pale green, maturing to a much darker colour. Fallen leaves are dull reddish in colour. The bark is grey to brown, rough, and somewhat coarsely reticulate, narrowly fissured and transversely cracked.

== Uses ==
The wood is medium reddish brown, heavy, tough and strong with a slightly interlocking grain. It is not easy to work with and blunts tools very quickly. In Shona culture, infusions of the tree leaf have traditionally been used for treatment of constipation and lumbago amongst other things.

== Gallery ==
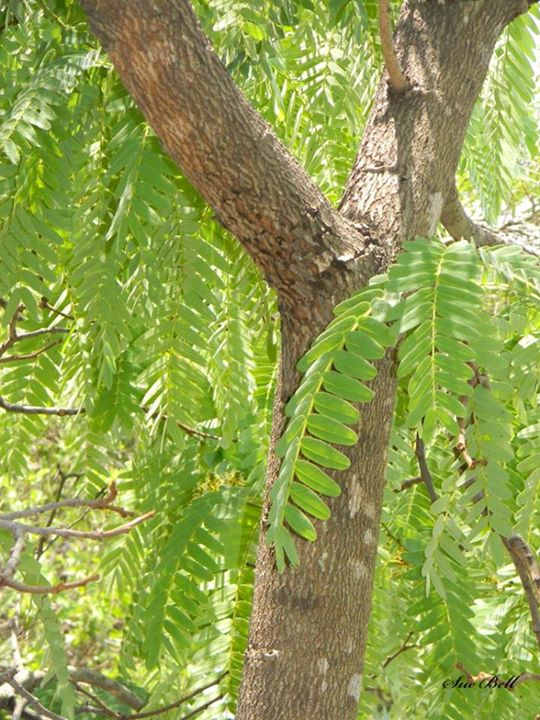

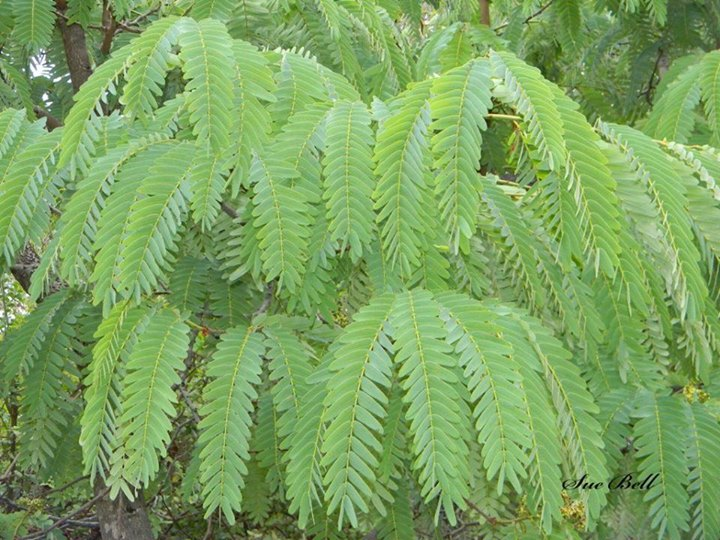

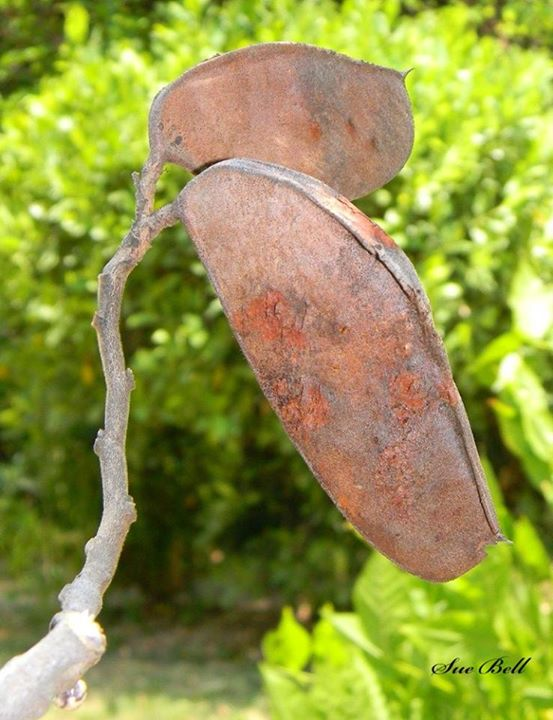
Pods
