= Chimanimani National Park (Mozambique) =

Protected area in Mozambique

- Parque Nacional de Chimanimani
- IUCN category II (national park)
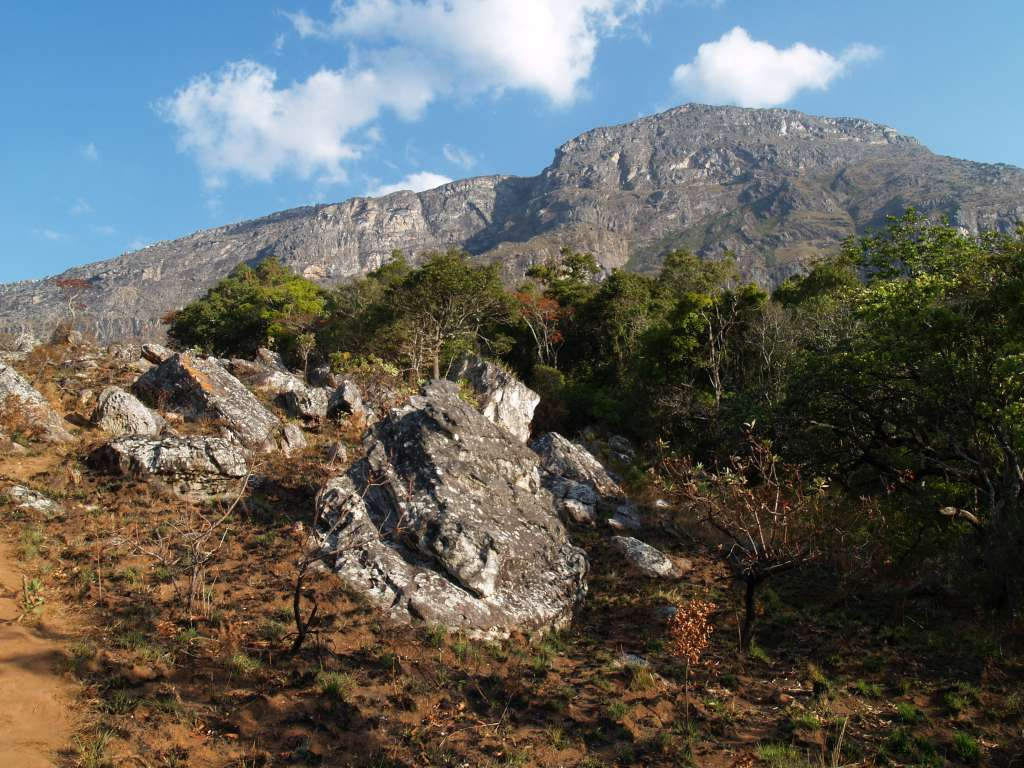
- The reserve includes Monte Binga, the highest point in Mozambique.

- Location within Mozambique
- Coordinates: 19°47′42″S 33°05′21″E
- Area: 656 km^{2} (253 sq mi)
- Designation: National park
- Designated: 2003 (national reserve), 2020 (national park)
- Administrator: National Administration of Conservation Areas (ANAC)

Chimanimani National Park (Portuguese: Parque Nacional de Chimanimani) is a protected area next to Chimoio, capital of Manica Province in Mozambique. It is located in the Chimanimani Mountains on the border with Zimbabwe. Together with Zimbabwe's Chimanimani National Park, it forms the Chimanimani Transfrontier Park. It was designated a national reserve in 2003. In 2020 it was designated a national park.

== Geography ==
With an area of 656 km^{2}, the park protects the Mozambican portion of the Chimanimani Mountains, including Monte Binga (2,436 m), Mozambique's highest peak. The park has a larger buffer zone (1,723 km^{2}), which extends into lower-elevation areas to the south, east, and north, and includes the Moribane, Mpunga, Maronga, and Zomba forest reserves. The Moribane, Mpunga, and Maronga forest reserves were established in 1953.

== Flora and fauna ==
The park contains rare species such as the red-capped robin-chat and the Welwitsch's bat.

== Culture ==
The locals preserve the cave paintings, ancient traditions and beliefs, all of which give the park a cultural identity.

== Access ==
The park can be reached from the city of Chimoio. The park has several road connections with the north, south and central parts of Mozambique, as well as with Zimbabwe.
