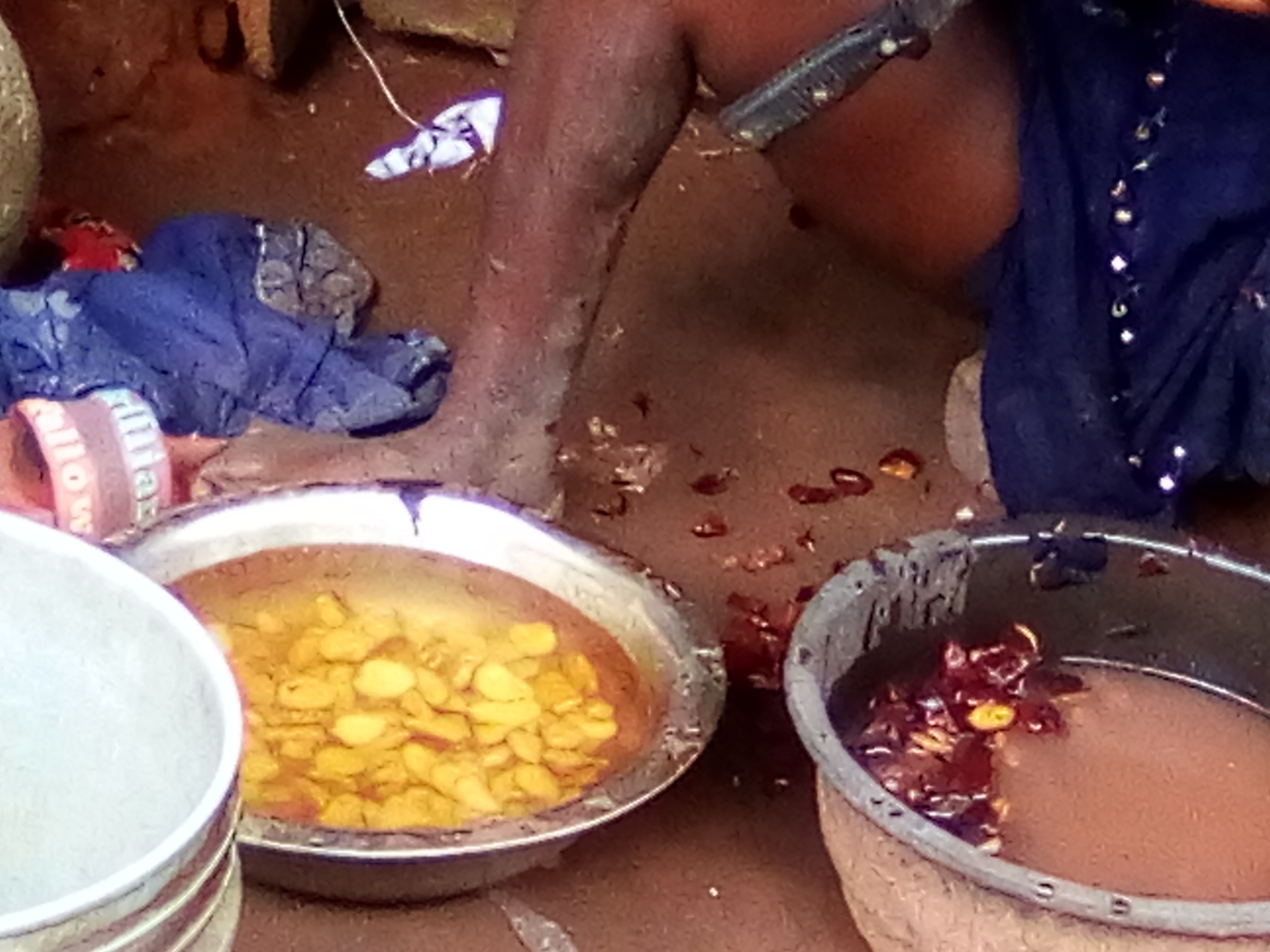

Scientific classification
- Kingdom: Plantae
- Clade: Tracheophytes
- Clade: Angiosperms
- Clade: Eudicots
- Clade: Rosids
- Order: Fabales
- Family: Fabaceae
- Genus: Brachystegia
- Species: B. eurycoma

Binomial name
- Brachystegia eurycoma Harms

= Brachystegia eurycoma =

Species of legume

Brachystegia eurycoma, a plant in the family Fabaceae, is a sizable species of tree found in southern Nigeria and western Cameroon. It has a spreading, flattened crown.

== Description ==
A fairly large tree, B. eurycoma reaches a height of about 35 m (115 ft) and a diameter of 2.5 m (8 ft). The trunk is irregular, with small buttresses. The outer bark is rough, brownish-grey, and peels away in large flakes. The inner bark is red and fibrous, darkening on exposure to the air and exuding a yellowish or reddish gum. The crown is broad and flattened, the branches are spreading and irregular and the twigs are downy when young. The leaves are pinnate with a short petiole swollen at its base and four to six pairs of oblong-elliptical leaflets, the basal ones being the smallest and the terminal ones the largest. The inflorescence is a terminal panicle, the individual flowers having short stalks and being surrounded by dense brown hairs; the flowers are petal-less and have a boss of ten long stamens and a long coiled pistil. The fruits are flattened pods and the glossy brown seeds are disc-shaped and about 2 cm (0.8 in) in diameter; when ripe, the pods burst explosively and throw out the seeds.

== Distribution and habitat ==
Brachystegia eurycoma is endemic to southern Nigeria and western Cameroon, and possibly to Gabon. It is a fairly common tree in riverine forests. It is found in miombo woodland at altitudes of up to about 1,150 m (3,800 ft).

== Human uses ==
Timber from this tree is used locally but is not exported; the heartwood is hard and difficult to work, and the wood is liable to split unless dried with care. The seeds are ground into a flour, known as achi, which can be used as a thickening agent, and the active ingredient, a polysaccharide, has been investigated as a wound-healing agent when mixed with snail mucin. The gum is used in a similar way to gutta-percha. Extracts from the wood have some anti-fungal and anti-termite properties.
