= Brachystegia leonensis =

Conservation status
- Vulnerable (IUCN 3.1)

Scientific classification
- Kingdom: Plantae
- Clade: Embryophytes
- Clade: Tracheophytes
- Clade: Spermatophytes
- Clade: Angiosperms
- Clade: Eudicots
- Clade: Rosids
- Order: Fabales
- Family: Fabaceae
- Genus: Brachystegia
- Species: B. leonensis

Binomial name
- Brachystegia leonensis Hutch. & Burtt Davy

Species of flowering plant

Brachystegia leonensis is a medium to tall sized tree occurring in the rain forests of West Africa, belonging to the family Fabaceae. It is one of three species within the genus Brachystegia that is represented in West Africa. It is morphologically close to Brachystegia kennedyi, a species occurring in Nigeria.

== Description ==
A medium to large sized tree, the species is capable of reaching more than 40 m (130 ft) in height and up to 1.8 m (5 ft 11 in) in diameter. The largest specimen, said to be the largest tree in Liberia is 58 m (190 ft) height and 2.2 m diameter (7 m girth). It has a cylindrical trunk with buttressed roots at the base, the crown is fairly open, spreading and with drooping leaves. The bark is thick, smooth but sometimes has irregular scales, it is greyish in color while the slash is hard, reddish brown turing dark red upon exposure and exuding a reddish sap. Leaves are alternate and paripinnately compound and normally has about 8 - 10 pairs of leaflets. Leaflets are elliptic in shape and papery in texture, up to 9 cm (3.5 in) long and 2.5 cm (0.98 in) wide, with the apex pointed while the base is rounded. Inflorescence are in dense terminal or axillary panicles and bearing spikes from 2–5 cm (0.79–1.97 in) long.

== Distribution and habitat ==
Represented in West Africa in Liberia, Sierra Leone and Ivory Coast. It is found in evergreen forests with well drained soils.
