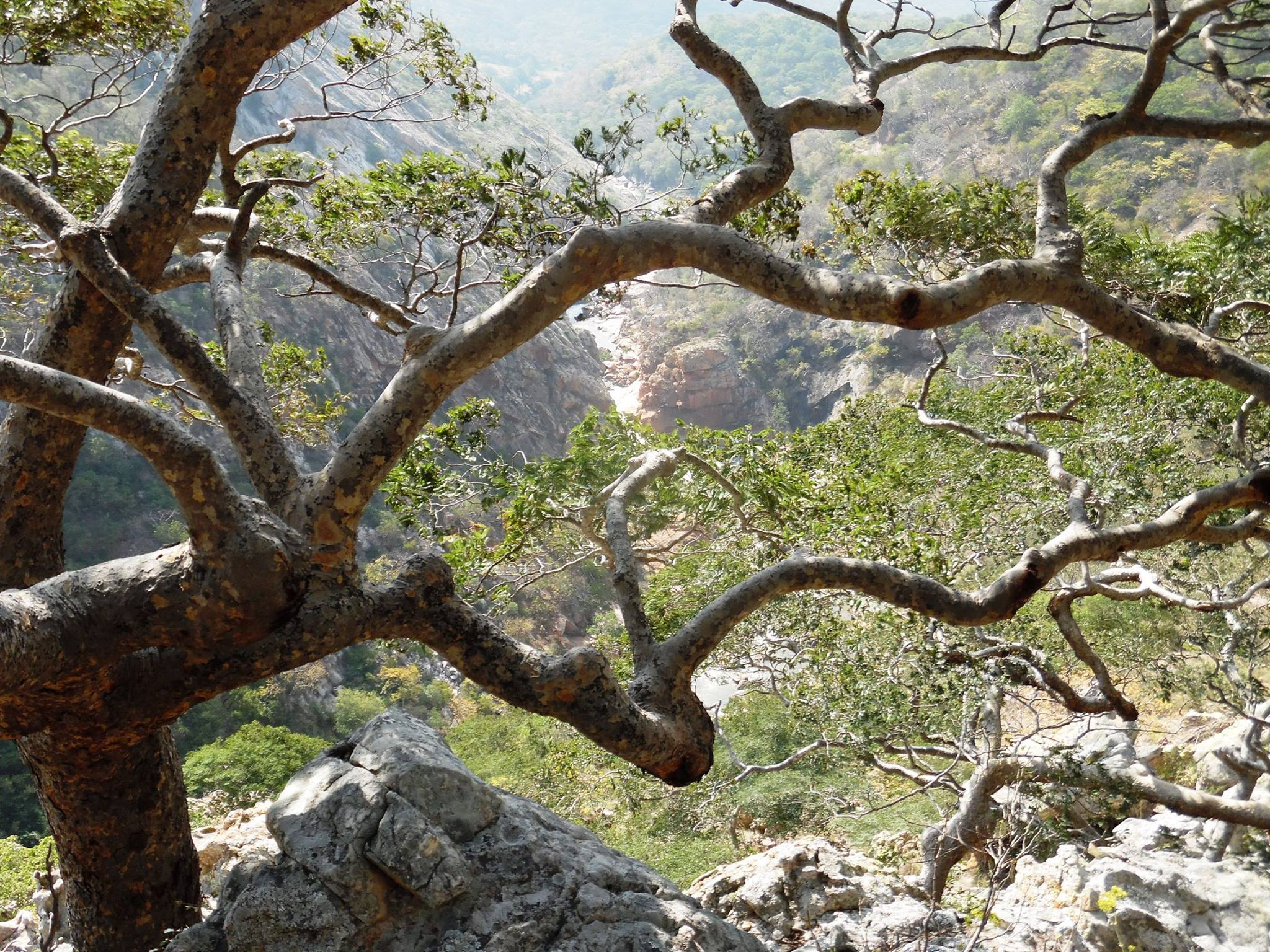
- Brachystegia tamarindoides

Scientific classification
- Kingdom: Plantae
- Clade: Tracheophytes
- Clade: Angiosperms
- Clade: Eudicots
- Clade: Rosids
- Order: Fabales
- Family: Fabaceae
- Subfamily: Detarioideae
- Tribe: Amherstieae
- Genus: Brachystegia; Benth. (1865)

Species
- 32; see text

= Brachystegia =

Genus of tree

Brachystegia is a genus of tree of the subfamily Detarioideae that is native to tropical Africa.

Trees of the genus are commonly known as miombo, and are dominant in the miombo woodlands of central and southern tropical Africa. The Zambezian region is the centre of diversity for the genus.

== Description ==
Hybridisation between the species occurs and taxa show considerable variation in leaflet size, shape and number, making identification difficult.

New leaves show a great range of red colours when immature, later turning to various shades of green.

== Range and habitat ==
Brachystegia species range from coastal West Africa through Nigeria and Central Africa to the Northern Province of South Africa.

Habitats include seasonally dry forest, woodland, wooded grassland and bushland, and lowland tropical rain forest, often along rivers, the margins of wetlands, and on upland plateaus. Some species form monodominant stands.

18 species are native to Zambezian woodland. Six grow in Guineo–Congolian forest, with six in west-central Africa and 1 in West Africa. One species grows in the Zanzibar–Inhambane coastal forests of eastern Mozambique.

== Species ==
32 species are currently accepted:

- Brachystegia allenii Hutch. & Burtt Davy – Tanzania, DR Congo, Malawi, Zambia, Mozambique, Zimbabwe
- Brachystegia angustistipulata De Wild. – Tanzania and southern DR Congo
- Brachystegia appendiculata Benth. – Malawi
- Brachystegia astlei Hoyle – Zambia
- Brachystegia bakeriana Hutch. & Burtt Davy – southeastern Angola and Zambia
- Brachystegia bequaertii De Wild. – southern DR Congo
- Brachystegia boehmii Taub. – Tanzania and DR Congo to Angola, Botswana, and Mozambique
- Brachystegia bournei Greenway – Zambia
- Brachystegia bussei Harms – DR Congo and Tanzania to Zimbabwe and Mozambique
- Brachystegia cynometroides Harms – Cameroon and southwestern Central African Republic
- Brachystegia eurycoma Harms Nigeria, Cameroon, and Gabon
- Brachystegia floribunda Benth. – Tanzania and DR Congo to Angola, Zambia, and Mozambique
- Brachystegia glaberrima R.E.Fr. – Tanzania, DR Congo, and Zambia
- Brachystegia gossweileri Hutch. & Burtt Davy – DR Congo, Angola, and Zambia
- Brachystegia kennedyi Hoyle – southern Nigeria and Cameroon
- Brachystegia laurentii (De Wild.) Louis ex J.Léonard – Cameroon, Gabon, and DR Congo
- Brachystegia leonensis Hutch. & Burtt Davy – Sierra Leone, Liberia, and Côte d'Ivoire
- Brachystegia letestui De Wild. – southern DR Congo
- Brachystegia longifolia Benth. – Tanzania and DR Congo to Angola, Zambia, and Mozambique
- Brachystegia lujae De Wild. ex Hutch. & Burtt Davy – DR Congo
- Brachystegia manga De Wild. – Tanzania and DR Congo to Angola, Zimbabwe, and Mozambique
- Brachystegia michelmorei Hoyle – Zambia
- Brachystegia mildbraedii Harms – Cameroon and Gabon
- Brachystegia nigerica Hoyle and A.P.D.Jones – Nigeria
- Brachystegia oblonga Sim – northeastern Mozambique
- Brachystegia puberula Hutch. & Burtt Davy – Tanzania, DR Congo, Zambia, and Angola
- Brachystegia russelliae I.M.Johnst. southern DR Congo, Angola, and Zambia
- Brachystegia spiciformis Benth. – southeastern Kenya and DR Congo to Angola and Northern Province of South Africa
- Brachystegia stipulata De Wild. – Tanzania and DR Congo to Zambia and Mozambique
- Brachystegia tamarindoides Welw. ex Benth. – Tanzania and DR Congo to Angola, Zimbabwe, and Mozambique
- Brachystegia taxifolia Harms Tanzania, DR Congo, Malawi, and Zambia
- Brachystegia utilis Hutch. & Burtt Davy – Tanzania and DR Congo to Angola, Zimbabwe, and Mozambique
- Brachystegia × weltwitschii Taub. – Angola
