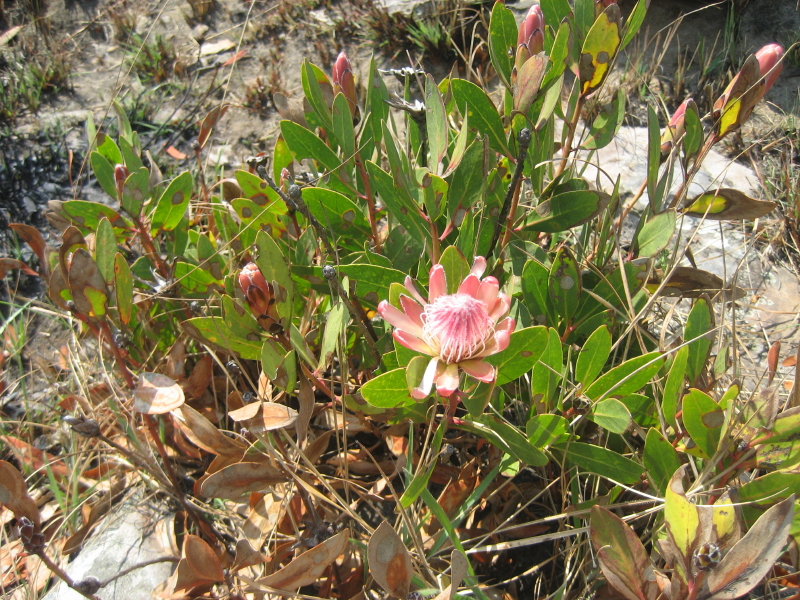

Scientific classification
- Kingdom: Plantae
- Clade: Tracheophytes
- Clade: Angiosperms
- Clade: Eudicots
- Order: Proteales
- Family: Proteaceae
- Genus: Protea
- Species: P. wentzeliana

Binomial name
- Protea wentzeliana Engl.

Synonyms
- Protea neocrinita Beard

= Protea wentzeliana =

Species of shrub

Protea wentzeliana, also known as Wentzel's sugarbush, is a shrub belonging to the genus Protea.

The species is found in the Chimanimani Mountains between Zimbabwe and Mozambique, as well as Malawi, southern Tanzania and central Angola.

The shrub grows up to 1.6 m. It blooms mainly from May to December. The trunk is thin with few branches.

The plant re-sprouts after a wildfire from an underground rootstock. The seeds are stored in a cap and released after they are ripe. The seeds are dispersed by means of the wind. The plant is monoecious with both sexes in each flower. Beetles are probably the creatures responsible for pollinating the flowers. The plant grows on poorly drained and wet soil in dongas and ditches in miombo woodland.
