= Brachystegia kennedyi =

Conservation status
- Vulnerable (IUCN 2.3)

Scientific classification
- Kingdom: Plantae
- Clade: Tracheophytes
- Clade: Angiosperms
- Clade: Eudicots
- Clade: Rosids
- Order: Fabales
- Family: Fabaceae
- Genus: Brachystegia
- Species: B. kennedyi

Binomial name
- Brachystegia kennedyi Hoyle

Species of legume

Brachystegia kennedyi is a species of plant in the family Fabaceae. It is found in Cameroon and Nigeria. It is threatened by habitat loss.
