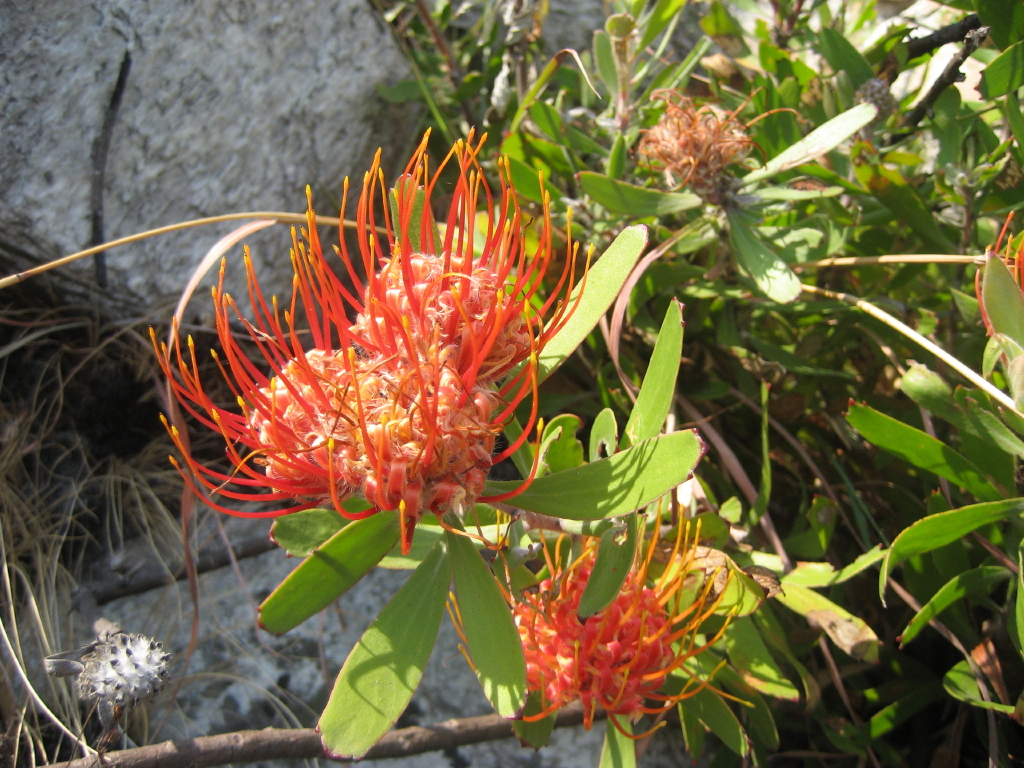

Conservation status
- Least Concern (IUCN 3.1)

Scientific classification
- Kingdom: Plantae
- Clade: Tracheophytes
- Clade: Angiosperms
- Clade: Eudicots
- Order: Proteales
- Family: Proteaceae
- Genus: Leucospermum
- Species: L. saxosum

Binomial name
- Leucospermum saxosum S.Moore (1911)

= Leucospermum saxosum =

Species of evergreen shrub

Leucospermum saxosum is an upright evergreen shrub of up to 2 m (6.6 ft) high that is assigned to the family Proteaceae. It has lance-shaped, leathery leaves and egg-shaped flower heads of about 5 cm (2.0 in) in diameter, with initially yellow-orange flowers, later turning crimson, from which long styles stick out, giving the flower head the appearance of a pincushion. It is called escarpment pincushion in English. It grows on quartzite soils in the mountains on the Zimbabwe-Mozambique border and in eastern Transvaal.

== Taxonomy ==
It was described by S. Moore in 1911 from material collected in 1906 by Charles Francis Massy Swynnerton in the Chimanimani District in Zimbabwe. No other scientific names exist. The species has been assigned to the section Crassicaudex.

The species name saxosum means "occurring among rocks".

== Description ==
Leucospermum saxosum is an upright, evergreen shrub of up to 2 m (6.6 ft) high, with many stems originating directly from the woody underground rootstock. The stems are upright, 3–8 mm (0.12–0.31 in) in diameter and have a dense covering of fine twisted hairs and a few 2–3 mm (0.079–0.118 in) long erect hairs. The lance-shaped, elliptic or almost linear leaves of 5½–11½ cm (2.2–4.6 in) long and ½–2½ cm (0.2–1.0 in) wide, with a narrow, wedge-shaped base either or not with a short leaf stalk, and wider towards the tip, usually having three to six teeth near the tip, but these are sometimes absent.

The egg-shaped flower heads of 4–6 cm (1.6–2.4 in) in diameter mostly sit individually but sometimes with two together on the branches. Each flower head is atop a 1–1½ cm (0.4–0.6 in) long stalk and subtended by two or three whorls of overlapping, softly hairy, rubbery, oval bracts 6–8 mm (0.24–0.31 in) long and with a suddenly pointed tip. They cover the common base of the flowers in the same head, which is narrowly cylindric in shape and 2½–3 cm (1.0–1.2 in) long and about ½ cm (0.2 in) wide. The bracts that subtend the individual bisexual flower are very broadly egg-shaped with a pointy tip that embraces the base of the flower. The perianth is 3–3½ cm long, initially yellow-orange in colour, but eventually turning crimson. Its base is fused into a funnel-shaped tube of about 6 mm (0.24 in) long, smooth at its base and with a minutely powdery covering near the top. The anthers are elliptic in shape, about 2 mm (0.079 in) long, lack a recognisable filament and are directly attached near the top of the perianth lobes. The style is 4½–5½ cm (1.8-2.2 in) long, curves slightly towards the center of the flower head, is initially orange in color but becomes reddish over time. It is topped by a slight thickening that is called the pollen presenter, which has a very slim conical shape with a pointy tip, is 2–3 mm (0.079–0.118 in) long, with a small groove that acts as the stigma at the very tip. Subtending the ovary are four awl-shaped scales of about 2 mm (0.079 in) long.

The subtribe Proteinae, to which the genus Leucospermum has been assigned, consistently has a basic chromosome number of twelve (2n=24).

=== Differences from related species ===
The escarpment pincushion differs from its closest relatives by the funnel-shaped tube of the perianth, the very slim cone-shaped pollen presenter that is hardly wider than the lower style, the elliptic or lance-shapes leaves with a very narrowly wedge-shaped base or leaf stalk.

== Distribution, habitat and ecology ==
The species is the only Leucospermum species that naturally occurs outside South Africa, although it is also present in Mpumalanga. It can be found at an elevation of 1200–2100 m (4000–7000 ft) in mountain grassland or shrubland with other sclerophyllous plants such as other Proteaceae. Across its range, the average annual rainfall is 1100–1500 mm (45–60 in), most of which falls during the summer, and regular mists occur. In the Eastern Highlands on the Zimbabwe-Mozambique border it can be found on dry rocky slopes and on outcrops of Frontier Quartzite, and in Transvaal on the Wolkberg Quartzite that occurs in the eastern slopes of the northern Drakensberg Range. It flowers throughout the year, but mostly between September and December, and is pollinated by birds. The seeds are released from the heads after about two months and distributed by ants. It is very fire resistant because it regrows from its underground rootstock.
