= Erica pleiotricha =

Conservation status
- Near Threatened (IUCN 3.1)

Scientific classification
- Kingdom: Plantae
- Clade: Tracheophytes
- Clade: Angiosperms
- Clade: Eudicots
- Clade: Asterids
- Order: Ericales
- Family: Ericaceae
- Genus: Erica
- Species: E. pleiotricha

Binomial name
- Erica pleiotricha S.Moore, (1911)

Synonyms
- Erica eylesii L.Bolus; Erica eylesii Alm & T.C.E.Fr.; Erica eylesii var. blaeriodes Wild.; Erica pleiotricha var. blaeriodes (Wild.) R.Ross; Erica thryptomenoides S.Moore

Species of flowering plant

Erica pleiotricha is a plant belonging to the genus Erica and is native to Mozambique and Zimbabwe where it occurs in the Chimanimani Mountains.
