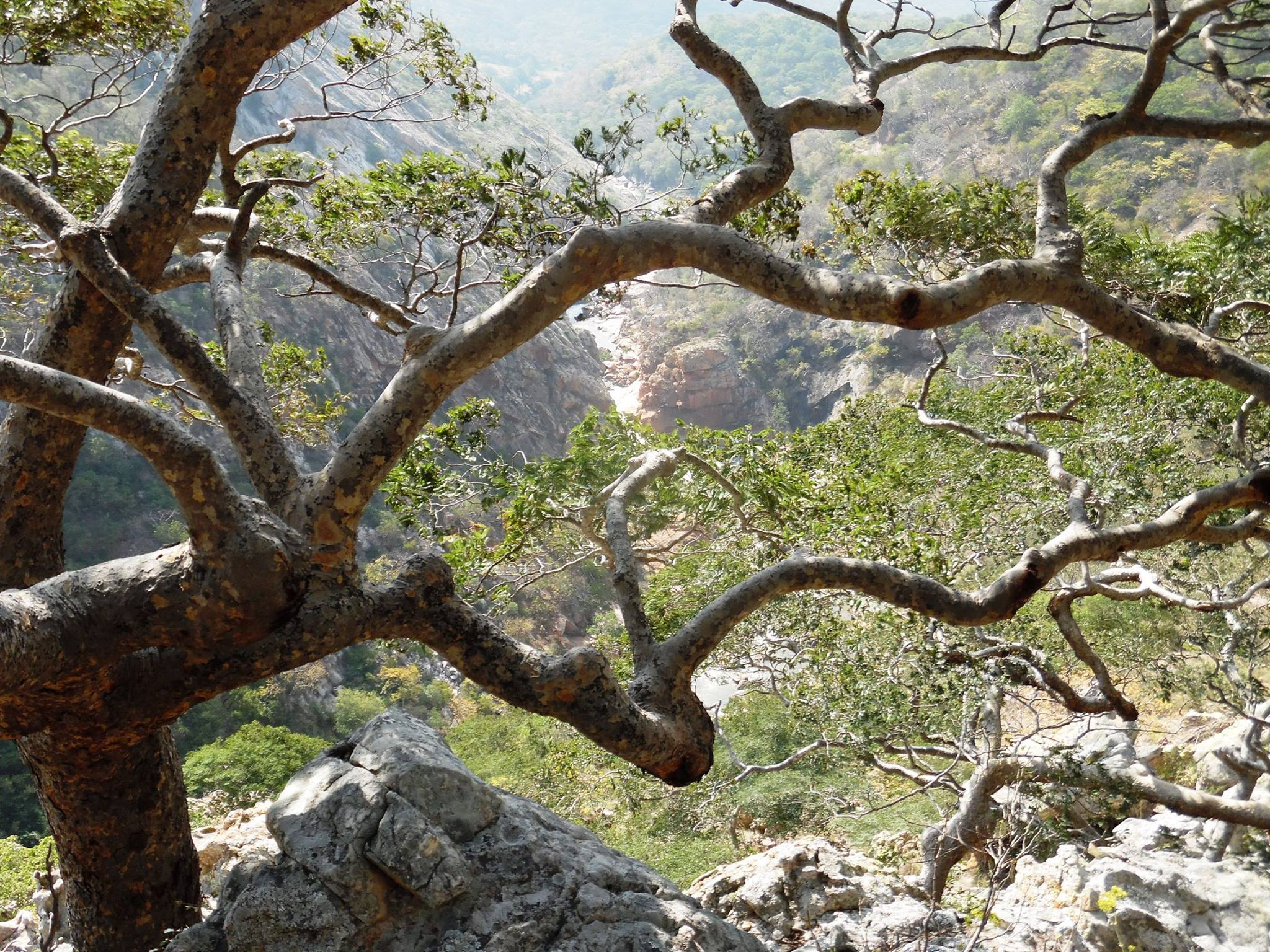
- At Gairezi River on Zimbabwe-Mozambique border

Conservation status
- Least Concern (IUCN 3.1)

Scientific classification
- Kingdom: Plantae
- Clade: Tracheophytes
- Clade: Angiosperms
- Clade: Eudicots
- Clade: Rosids
- Order: Fabales
- Family: Fabaceae
- Genus: Brachystegia
- Species: B. tamarindoides

Binomial name
- Brachystegia tamarindoides Benth.

Synonyms
- Brachystegia fischeri Taub.; Brachystegia glaucescens Hutch. & Burtt Davy; Brachystegia microphylla Harms; Brachystegia pectinata Sim; Brachystegia reticulata Hutch & Burtt Davy

= Brachystegia tamarindoides =

Mu'unze

Species of legume

Brachystegia tamarindoides, known as mu'unze and also as the mountain acacia, is a medium-sized tree with smooth grey bark, bluish-green leaves and small creamy-white flowers that produce copious amounts of pollen and nectar. It is almost always very close to upturned umbrella shaped with a partially developed flat top, making it easy to recognise in mixed woodland. In this it differs from most of the other Brachystegia species that have variable shapes. The leaves are feathery in appearance, with around 10-12 leaflets arrayed along each leaf stalk.

== Distribution ==
The muunze is found all over south tropical Africa and the less humid parts of east equatorial Africa. It reaches its southernmost extent around 21° S in the Runde River valley region of Zimbabwe. It is a tree of inland regions thriving at altitudes of around 900 – 1750 metres. In the hotter, northern parts of its range it is found in drier types of woodland but further south it is found in both moist and dry open woodland. It prefers well-drained conditions and tolerates even very thin and rocky soils and so is usually restricted to hillsides and hilltops (not mountainous regions as such) rather than best positions in valley floors. In these positions, the tree is very easily recognisable due to its fluttering foliage, distinctive shape and flaky but smooth grey bark.

== Ecology ==
The muunze is nowhere common but is widely distributed in its range and grows to its maximum size where many other trees find the soil too thin or poor; about 14 – 16 metres depending on competition. It is a tree of open woodland in areas of contrasting wet and dry seasons, the longer the dry season, the more likely that the muunze stands bare for a notable period. Like other Brachystegia species it needs a cool, dry resting period when it loses its leaves followed by a hot dry spell that revives the tree. At this time (usually August–September) the new leaves are produced. These are a pale to rich red colour that fade to green over about a week. The muunze is therefore a beautiful sight in springtime but it does not compare to the much more striking show put on by the closely related msasa. The seeds are enclosed in a purplish woody pod. The seeds are dispersed, as in other Brachystegia species, when the drying pod is split by increasing tension in autumn (about April to May or later), hurling the seeds from it.

Woodland of Brachystegia tamarindoides subsp. microphylla grows on quartzite outcrops and rocky slopes in the Chimanimani Mountains of Mozambique and Zimbabwe. The trees grow low and spreading, and are draped with tassels of Usnea lichen, with a sparse understory.

== Name usage ==
The misnomer "mountain acacia" for B. tamarindoides reflects the similarity of the tree's foliage to the feathery acacia species that are also found in Africa. Unlike African acacias, however, the muunze has no thorns. The name is, for instance, found in a paper concerning the degradation of woodlands by elephant predation and fire in the northern part of the Gonarezhou National Park in south-east Zimbabwe. The name muunze is Shona and is used in Zimbabwe and Mozambique.

== See also ==
- Miombo
