= Erica simii =

Conservation status
- Least Concern (IUCN 3.1)

Scientific classification
- Kingdom: Plantae
- Clade: Tracheophytes
- Clade: Angiosperms
- Clade: Eudicots
- Clade: Asterids
- Order: Ericales
- Family: Ericaceae
- Genus: Erica
- Species: E. simii

Binomial name
- Erica simii (S.Moore) E.G.H.Oliv., (1987)

Synonyms
- Philippia friesii Weim.; Philippia simii S.Moore

Species of flowering plant

Erica simii is a plant belonging to the genus Erica. The species is native to Limpopo, Mozambique and Zimbabwe.
