= Erica hexandra =

Conservation status
- Least Concern (IUCN 3.1)

Scientific classification
- Kingdom: Plantae
- Clade: Tracheophytes
- Clade: Angiosperms
- Clade: Eudicots
- Clade: Asterids
- Order: Ericales
- Family: Ericaceae
- Genus: Erica
- Species: E. hexandra

Binomial name
- Erica hexandra (S.Moore) E.G.H.Oliv., (1992)

Synonyms
- Philippia benguelensis var. intermedia Weim.; Philippia hexandra S.Moore; Philippia norlindhii Weim.

Species of flowering plant

Erica hexandra is a plant belonging to the genus Erica. The species is native to Mozambique, Zambia and Zimbabwe.
