= Mount Gorongosa =

Mountain in Mozambique

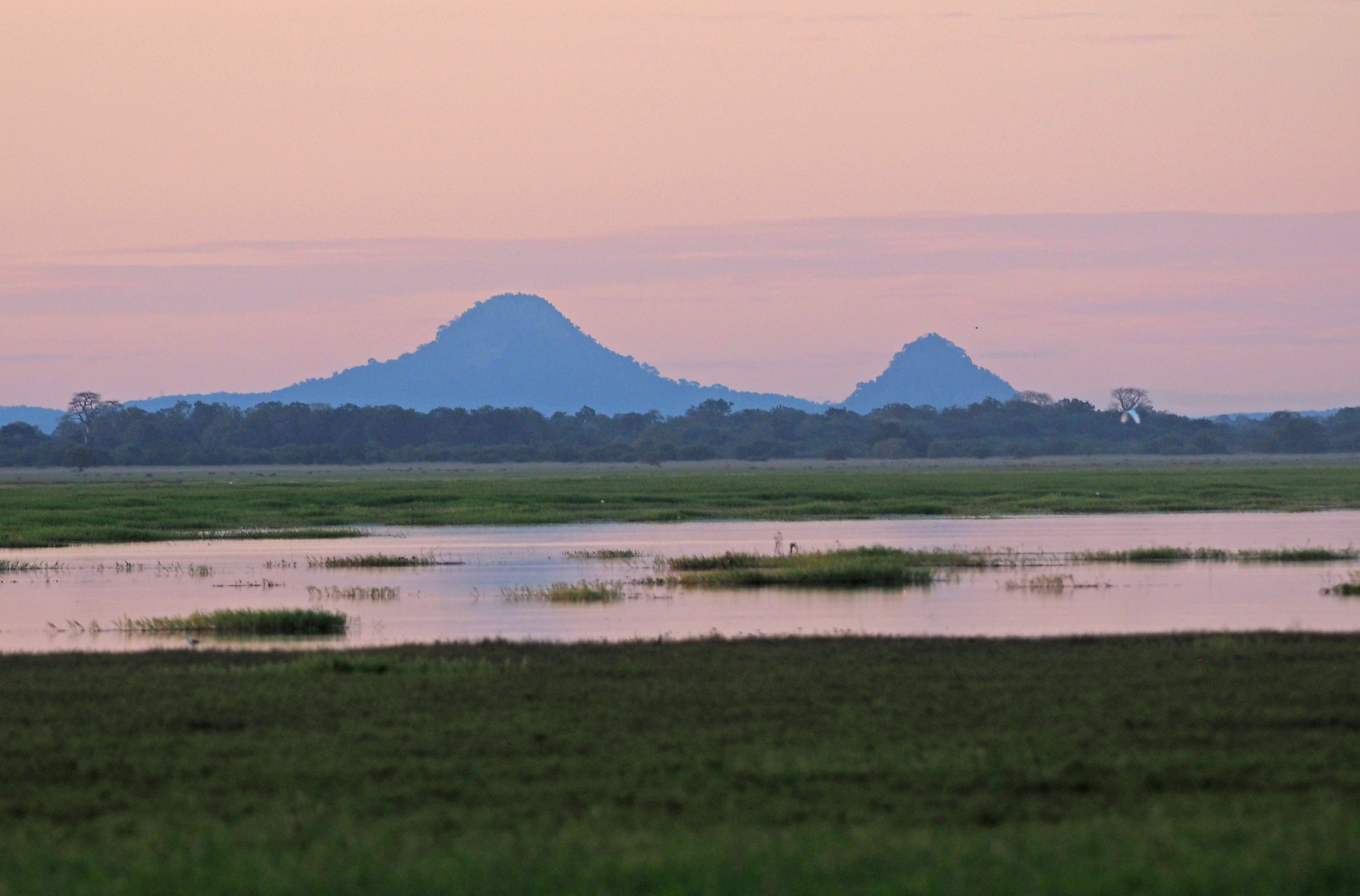
- Mount Gorongosa, Gorongosa National Park, Mozambique

Highest point
- Elevation: 1,863 m (6,112 ft)
- Prominence: 1,336 m (4,383 ft)
- Listing: Ribu
- Coordinates: 18°24′14″S 34°06′31.5″E

Naming
- Language of name: Portuguese

Geography
- Location within Mozambique
- Location: Mozambique

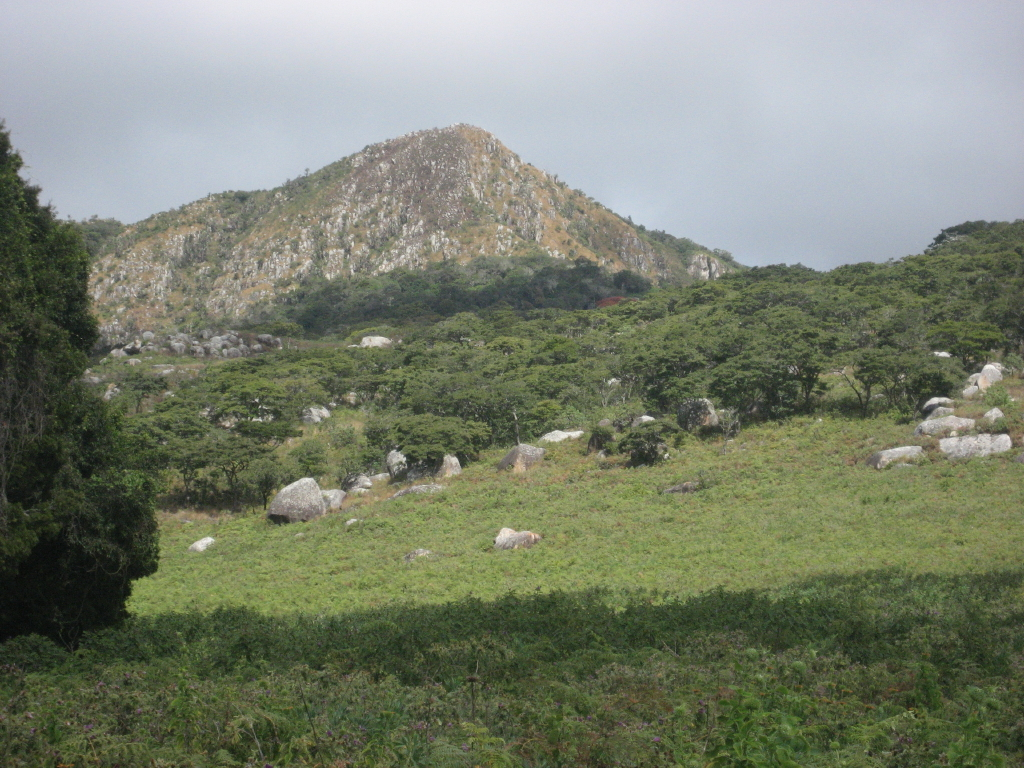
Gogogo Peak on Mount Gorongosa

Mount Gorongosa is an inselberg in Sofala Province of central Mozambique. Its highest peak, Gogogo, reaches an elevation of 1,863 meters (6,112 feet). It was created in the early Jurassic by the Karoo volcanism.

The upper zone of the mountain (above 700 meters) was made part of Gorongosa National Park by the Mozambican government in 2010. The main part of the park lies at a lower elevation to the east of the mountain.

== Geography and geology ==
Mount Gorongosa rises as an isolated massif from the surrounding lowlands. Mount Gorongosa is at the tip of a large, oval-shaped ring complex, some 30 kilometres (19 mi) by 25 kilometres (16 mi). There are three main peaks, one in the north, one in the south, and Gogogo, the highest, in the southwest. Between them is a plateau that contains three valleys. The mountain is composed of granites of Late Jurassic age, ringed by gabbros on the western and southern slopes.

== Climate ==
The mountain's climate is cooler and wetter than the surrounding lowlands. Moist oceanic air masses moving in from the southeast rise up the mountain slopes and cools, and the moisture in the air condenses and falls as rain, or forms low clouds and morning mists. The windward south and east slopes receive more moisture than the north and west slopes, which are in the rain shadow of the mountain.

== Ecology ==
The cooler, wetter climate of the mountain sustains several communities of plants and animals, distinct from the surrounding lowlands. The mountain is home to montane and submontane grasslands, moist evergreen forests, dry montane forests, miombo woodlands, and ericaceous heathlands.

Mount Gorongosa's forests and grasslands are an isolated enclave of the Eastern Zimbabwe montane forest-grassland mosaic ecoregion, which is mostly found to the west in the Eastern Highlands along the Mozambique-Zimbabwe border. The Southern miombo woodlands ecoregion surrounds the mountain at lower elevations.

== External links and references ==
- Summit Post on climbing Mount Gorongosa
