= Erica lanceolifera =

Conservation status
- Vulnerable (IUCN 3.1)

Scientific classification
- Kingdom: Plantae
- Clade: Tracheophytes
- Clade: Angiosperms
- Clade: Eudicots
- Clade: Asterids
- Order: Ericales
- Family: Ericaceae
- Genus: Erica
- Species: E. lanceolifera

Binomial name
- Erica lanceolifera S.Moore, (1911)

Synonyms
- Erica gazensis Wild

Species of flowering plant

Erica lanceolifera is a plant belonging to the genus Erica. The species is endemic to Zimbabwe.
