= Erica mannii =

Conservation status
- Least Concern (IUCN 3.1)

Scientific classification
- Kingdom: Plantae
- Clade: Tracheophytes
- Clade: Angiosperms
- Clade: Eudicots
- Clade: Asterids
- Order: Ericales
- Family: Ericaceae
- Genus: Erica
- Species: E. mannii

Binomial name
- Erica mannii (Hook.f.) Beentje (1990)

Synonyms
- Erica excelsa (Alm & T.C.E.Fr.) Beentje (1990), nom. illeg.; Erica johnstonii (Schweinf. ex Engl.) Dorr (2006); Erica mannii subsp. pallidiflora (Engl.) E.G.H.Oliv. (1992); Erica mannii subsp. usambarensis (Alm & T.C.E.Fr.) Beentje (1990); Erica rossii Dorr (1994); Ericinella mannii Hook.f. (1861) (basionym); Philippia excelsa Alm & T.C.E.Fr. (1927); Philippia johnstonii Schweinf. ex Engl. (1895); Philippia mannii (Hook.f.) Alm & T.C.E.Fr. (1927); Philippia mannii subsp. pallidiflora (Engl.) R.Ross (1980); Philippia mannii subsp. usambarensis (Alm & T.C.E.Fr.) R.Ross (1980); Philippia pallidiflora Engl. (1909); Philippia pallidiflora subsp. usambarensis (Alm & T.C.E.Fr.) R.Ross (1957); Philippia uhehensis Engl. (1909); Philippia usambarensis Alm & T.C.E.Fr. (1927)

Species of flowering plant

Erica mannii is a species of flowering plant in the heath family, Ericaceae. It is a shrub or tree native to tropical Africa, ranging across Central Africa from Kenya to Mozambique, Angola, and Democratic Republic of the Congo, and to Nigeria, Cameroon, and the Gulf of Guinea Islands.

It is native to tropical African mountains, where it grows in Afromontane scrub and thickets and in the high-elevation ericaceous belt, a transition between upper montane forests and higher-elevation subalpine grassland.
