= Monte Binga =

Highest mountain of Mozambique

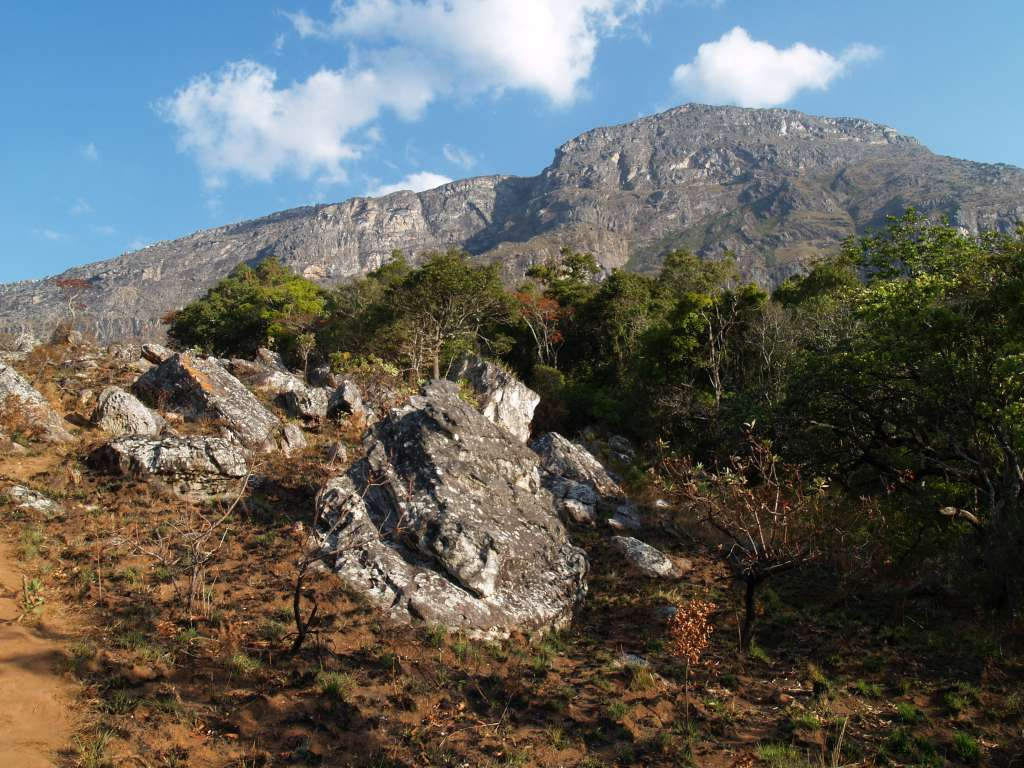
- Monte Binga north face

Highest point
- Elevation: 2,439.6 m (8,004 ft)
- Prominence: 1,350 m (4,430 ft)
- Listing: Country high point Ribu
- Coordinates: 19°46′36″S 33°03′43″E

Geography
- Location within Mozambique
- Location: Manica, Mozambique
- Parent range: Chimanimani Mountains

Monte Binga is the highest mountain in Mozambique and the second-highest in Zimbabwe. It is located in the Chimanimani Mountains, straddling the border of Zimbabwe and Mozambique in the Chimanimani Transfrontier Park in Manica Province. Its lies 8,004 feet (2,440m) above sea level.

== Geology ==
The mountain is composed of very hard pale grey precambrian quartzite, which underlies all of the Chimanimani Plateau, giving it a desolate rocky appearance. The north–south trending quartzite bedding is upturned near the summit to an angle of about 40 degrees and dips to the east, the foot of the mountain and the Turret Towers range immediately to the south lying on a thrust fault. Consequently, the eastern approach is more gradual, while the western face is steep to sheer in places. The northern face is cut off by a fault and is sheer near the top, changing to a vertical cliff lower down. Approaching from the west, from the Bundi River Valley, there is an ill-defined trail which branches off from the main smugglers trail to Skeleton Pass.

== Climbing ==
The climb is arduous and takes the best part of a day. There are a number of false summits en route. The best path, marked with cairns, climbs south-east then eastward up from the Bundi valley, then swings north-east below the mountain until, at Bingas's northern shoulder, swings south-east, climbs the mountain's western face, and, reaching the ridge, swings into a northward scramble up to the beacon: about three hours from the Bundi valley.

There is little or no water on the approach from the west, nor at the top, but small puddles of water seep from the peat and collect in hollows by the summit on the gentler eastern slope. There are no well-marked trails from Binga to the east, and climbers must make their own way, taking care when crossing the steep ravines that lead eastwards.

=== Summit ===
At the top, the mountain curves into a dome-like prominence. The appearance of the mountain top is bleak and rocky, with an extremely shallow peaty soil supporting only tussocky grass and moss between the lichen-covered hard-rock outcrops.

The views over the Mozambique plain are spectacular. Theoretically, with a telescope it should just be possible to see the Indian Ocean from the peak of Binga on a very clear day looking along an easterly bearing, at a range of 190 kilometres. The mountain is remote from settlements.
