= A. desaegeri =

A. desaegeri may refer to:

- Abacetus desaegeri, a ground beetle
- Amietia desaegeri, a frog found in Africa
  - Afrana desaegeri, a synonym of Amietia desaegeri
