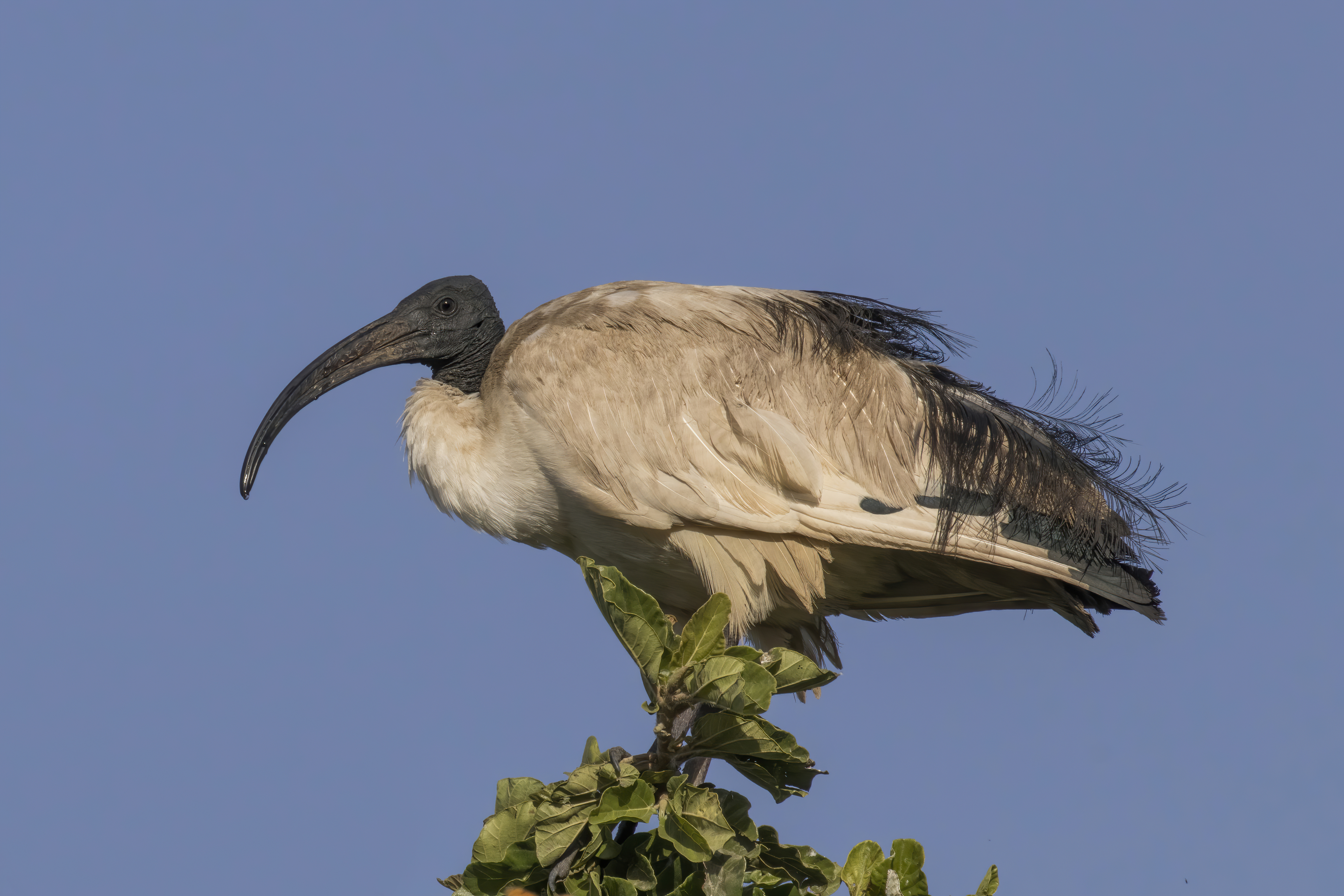
- in Ethiopia

Conservation status
- Least Concern (IUCN 3.1)

Scientific classification
- Kingdom: Animalia
- Phylum: Chordata
- Class: Aves
- Order: Pelecaniformes
- Family: Threskiornithidae
- Genus: Threskiornis
- Species: T. aethiopicus

Binomial name
- Threskiornis aethiopicus (Latham, 1790)
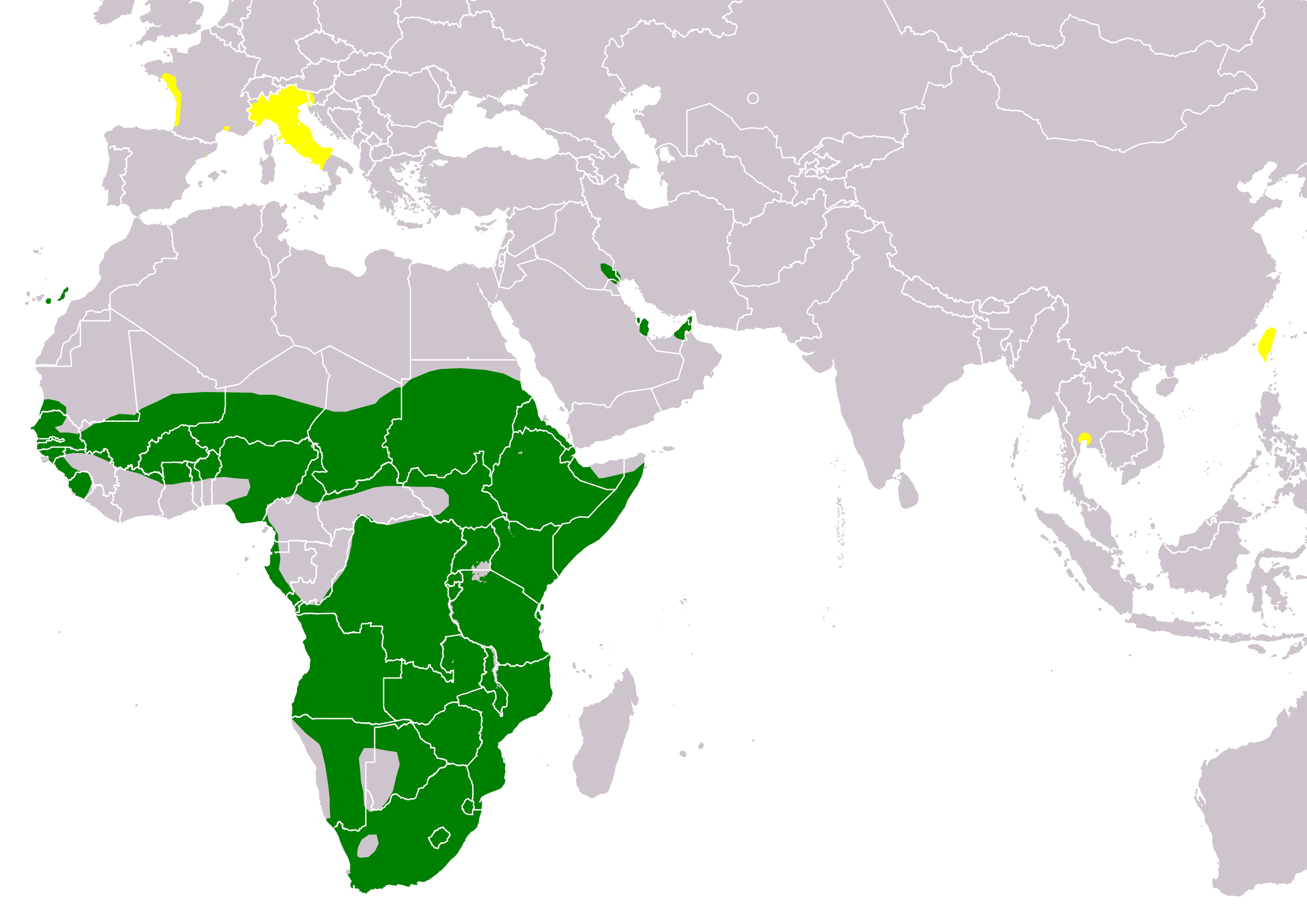
- Native and introduced ranges

Synonyms
- Tantalus aethiopicus Latham, 1790

= African sacred ibis =

Species of bird

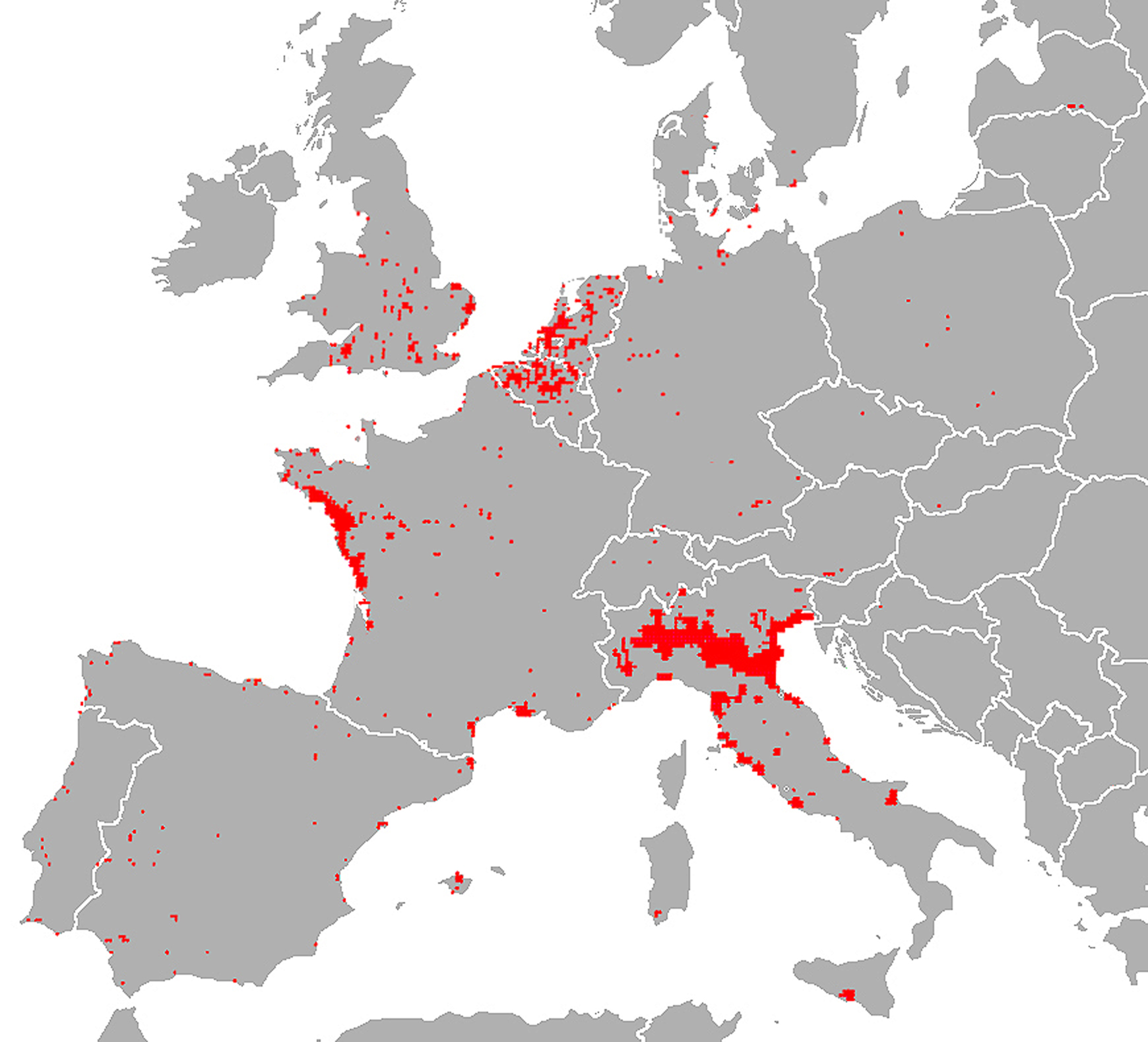
Observations of African sacred ibis 2015–2022.

African sacred ibis in Ystad, Sweden

The African sacred ibis (Threskiornis aethiopicus) is a species of ibis, a wading bird of the family Threskiornithidae. It is native to much of Africa, as well as small parts of Iraq, Iran and Kuwait. It is especially known for its role in Ancient Egyptian religion, where it was linked to the god Thoth. The species is currently extirpated from Egypt.

== Taxonomy ==
It is very closely related to the black-headed ibis and the Australian white ibis, with which it forms a superspecies complex, so much so that the three species are considered conspecific by some ornithologists. In mixed flocks these ibises often hybridise. The Australian white ibis is often called the sacred ibis colloquially.

Although known to the ancient civilisations of Greece, Rome and especially Africa, ibises were unfamiliar to western Europeans from the fall of Rome until the 19th century, and mentions of this bird in the ancient works of these civilisations were supposed to describe some type of curlew or other bird, and were thus translated as such. In 1758, Linnaeus was convinced that the ancient authors were describing a cattle egret (Bubulcus ibis), which he thus described as Ardea ibis. Following the work of Mathurin Jacques Brisson, who calls it Ibis candida in 1760, in the 12th edition of his Systema Naturae of 1766 Linnaeus classifies it as Tantalus ibis. These were also unfamiliar birds that did not occur in Europe at the time, in English in these times called the 'Egyptian ibis' by John Latham, and the 'emseesy' or 'ox-bird' by George Shaw.

In 1790, John Latham provided the first unambiguous modern scientific description of the sacred ibis as Tantalus aethiopicus, mentioning James Bruce of Kinnaird who called it 'abou hannes' in his writings describing his travels in Sudan and Ethiopia, and also described Tantalus melanocephalus of India.

Georges Cuvier named it Ibis religiosus in his Le Règne Animal of 1817.

In 1842, George Robert Gray reclassified the bird under the new genus Threskiornis, because the type of the genus Tantalus was designated as to be the wood stork, also formerly known as the wood ibis or wood pelican, and Gray decided these birds could not be classified in the same genus.

In a comprehensive review of plumage patterns by Holyoak in 1970, it was noted that the three taxa were extremely similar and that the Australian birds resembled Threskiornis aethiopicus in adult plumage and T. melanocephalus in juvenile plumage, he thus proposed they all be considered part of a single species T. aethiopicus. At the time, this was generally accepted by the scientific community; however, in 'The Birds of the Western Palearctic' compendium of 1977, Roselaar advocated splitting the group into four species, recognising T. bernieri, based again on the then known geographical morphological differences.

In 1990, Sibley & Monroe, in the general reference 'Distribution and Taxonomy of Birds of the World' followed Roselaar in recognising four species, which they repeated in 'A World Checklist of Birds' of 1993.

This taxon being split from T. melanocephalus and T. molucca was further advocated by another morphological study by Lowe and Richards in 1991, where they looked at plumage, bill and neck sack morphology and used many more skins. They concluded that the differences were such to merit separate species status for the three taxa, especially as they could find no intergradation in morphological characters in possible contact zones in SE Asia. They also cite observed differences in courtship displays between the Australian and African birds. Based on these characteristics they recommended the Madagascan birds T. bernieri and T. abbotti be considered a subspecies of T. aethiopicus.

== Description ==
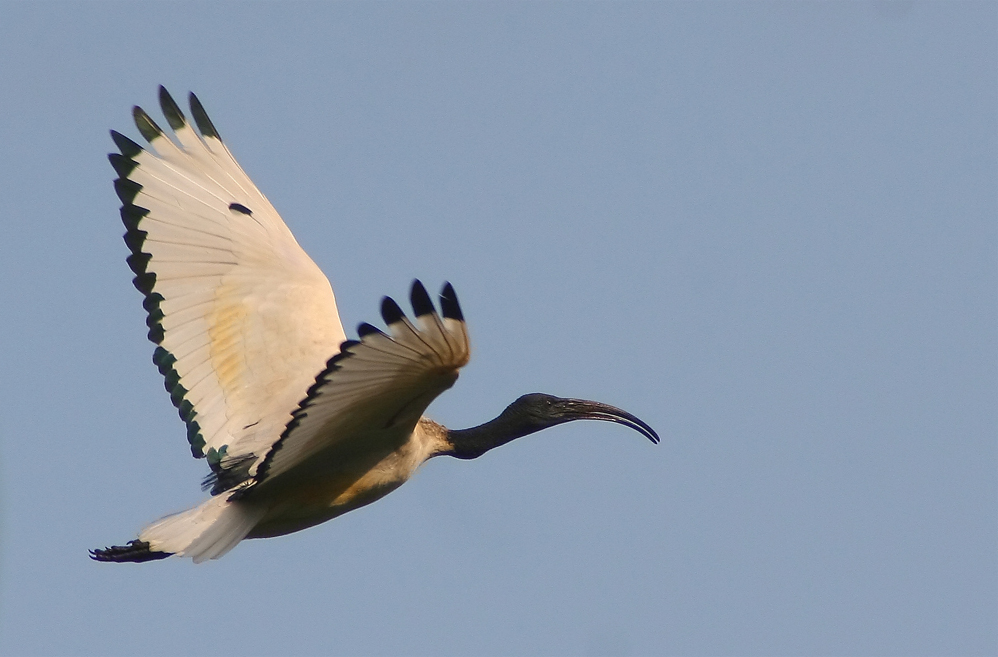
Flying in South Africa

An adult individual is 68 cm (27 in) long with all-white body plumage apart from dark plumes on the rump. Wingspan is 112 to 124 cm (44 to 49 in) and body weight 1.35 to 1.5 kg (3.0 to 3.3 lb). Males are generally slightly larger than females.

The bald head and neck, thick curved bill and legs are black. The white wings show a black rear border in flight. The eyes are brown with a dark red orbital ring. Sexes are similar, but juveniles have dirty white plumage, a smaller bill and some feathering on the neck, greenish-brown scapulars and more black on the primary coverts.

This bird is usually silent, but occasionally makes puppy-like yelping noises, unlike its vocal relative, the hadada ibis.

== Distribution ==
=== Native ===
The sacred ibis breeds in Sub-Saharan Africa and southeastern Iraq. A number of populations are migrant with the rains; some of the South African birds migrate 1,500 km as far north as Zambia, the African birds north of the equator migrate in the opposite direction. The Iraqi population usually migrates to southwestern Iran, but wandering vagrants have been seen as far south as Oman (rare, but regular) and as far north as the Caspian coasts of Kazakhstan and Russia (before 1945).

==== Africa ====
It was formerly found in North Africa including Egypt, where it was commonly venerated and mummified as a votive offering to the god Thoth. For many centuries until the Roman period the main temples buried a few dozen of thousands of birds a year, and to sustain sufficient numbers for the demand for sacrifices by pilgrims from all over Egypt, it was for some time believed that ibis breeding farms (called ibiotropheia by Herodotus) existed. Aristotle mentions in c. 350 BC that many sacred ibises are found all over Egypt. Strabo, writing around 20 AD, mentions large amounts of the birds in the streets of Alexandria, where he was living at the time; picking through the trash, attacking provisions, and defiling everything with their dung. Pierre Belon notes the many ibises in Egypt during his travels there in the late 1540s (he thought they were an odd type of stork). Benoît de Maillet, in his Description de l'Egypte (1735) relates that at the turn of the 17th century, when the great caravans travelled yearly to Mecca, great clouds of ibises would follow them from Egypt for over a hundred leagues into the desert to feed on the dung left at the encampments. By 1850, however, the species had disappeared from Egypt both as a breeding and migrant population, with the last, albeit questionable, sighting in 1864. An examination of the genetic diversity among mummified ibises suggested that there was no reduction in genetic diversity as would be caused if they were bred in captivity and further studies on isotopes suggest that the birds were not just wild caught but came from a wide geographic range.

The species did not breed in southern Africa before the beginning of the 20th century, but it has benefited from irrigation, dams, and commercial agricultural practices such as dung heaps, carrion and refuse tips. It began to breed in the early 20th century, and in the 1970s the first colonies of ibises were recorded in Zimbabwe and South Africa. Its population for example expanded 2-3-fold during the period between 1972 and 1995 in Orange Free State. It is now found throughout southern Africa. The species is a common resident in most parts of South Africa. Local numbers are swollen in summer by individuals migrating southwards from the equator.

Elsewhere in Africa it occurs throughout the continent south of the Sahara, but it is largely absent in the deserts of southwestern Africa (i.e. the Namib, the Karoo, the Kalahari) and probably the rainforests of the Congo. In west Africa it is fairly uncommon across the Sahel, except for the major floodplain systems. It can commonly found breeding along the Niger, in the Inner Niger Delta of Mali, the Logone of C.A.R., Lac Fitri in Chad, the Saloum Delta of Senegal, and other localities in relatively small numbers such as in The Gambia. It is common across eastern Africa and southern Africa. Large numbers can be found in the Sudd swamps and Lake Kundi in Sudan in the dry season. It is fairly widespread along the upper Nile River, and is quite common around Mogadishu, Somalia. In Tanzania there are a number of sites with 500 to 1,000+ birds, totalling some 20,000 birds.

==== Asia ====
The bird is also native to Yemen; in 2003 it bred in large numbers on small islands near Haramous and along the Red Sea coast near Hodeidah and Aden, where it was often found at waste-water treatment plants. It has been recorded nesting on a shipwreck in the Red Sea. It is also seen as a vagrant on Socotra. With the Yemen Civil War and famine, there have been no new census reports on the species in Yemen, though an estimate of approximately 30 mature individuals was given in 2015.

The species was fairly common in Iraq in the first half of the 20th century, but by the late 1960s it had become very scarce, with the population thought to number no more than 200 birds. The population was thought to have suffered greatly during the draining of the Mesopotamian Marshes of southeastern Iraq starting in the late 1980s, and feared to have disappeared entirely, but it has continuously been observed breeding in a colony in the Hawizeh Marshes (a part of the Mesopotamian Marshes) as of 2008, numbering up to 27 adults. It is also native to Kuwait, where it occurs as an extremely rare migrant, with only two known sightings, the last being a flock of 17 in 2007.

There are no records of the bird in Iran before the 1970s; however, small numbers were found overwintering in Khuzestan in 1970. Since the 1990s numbers appear to have slowly increased to a few dozen.

=== Introduced ===
The first African sacred ibises brought to Europe were two imported from Egypt to France in the mid-1700s. In the 1800s the first escapes were sighted in Europe (in Austria, Italy). In the 1970s it became fashionable for many zoos in Europe and elsewhere to keep their birds in free-flying colonies, which were allowed to forage in the area but would return to roost in the zoo every day. As such feral populations were established in Italy, France, Spain, Portugal, the Netherlands, the Canary Islands, Florida, Taiwan, the United Arab Emirates and possibly Bahrain.

Some studies indicate that the introduced populations in Europe have significant economic and ecological impacts, while others suggest that they constitute no substantial threat to native European bird species.

==== Europe ====
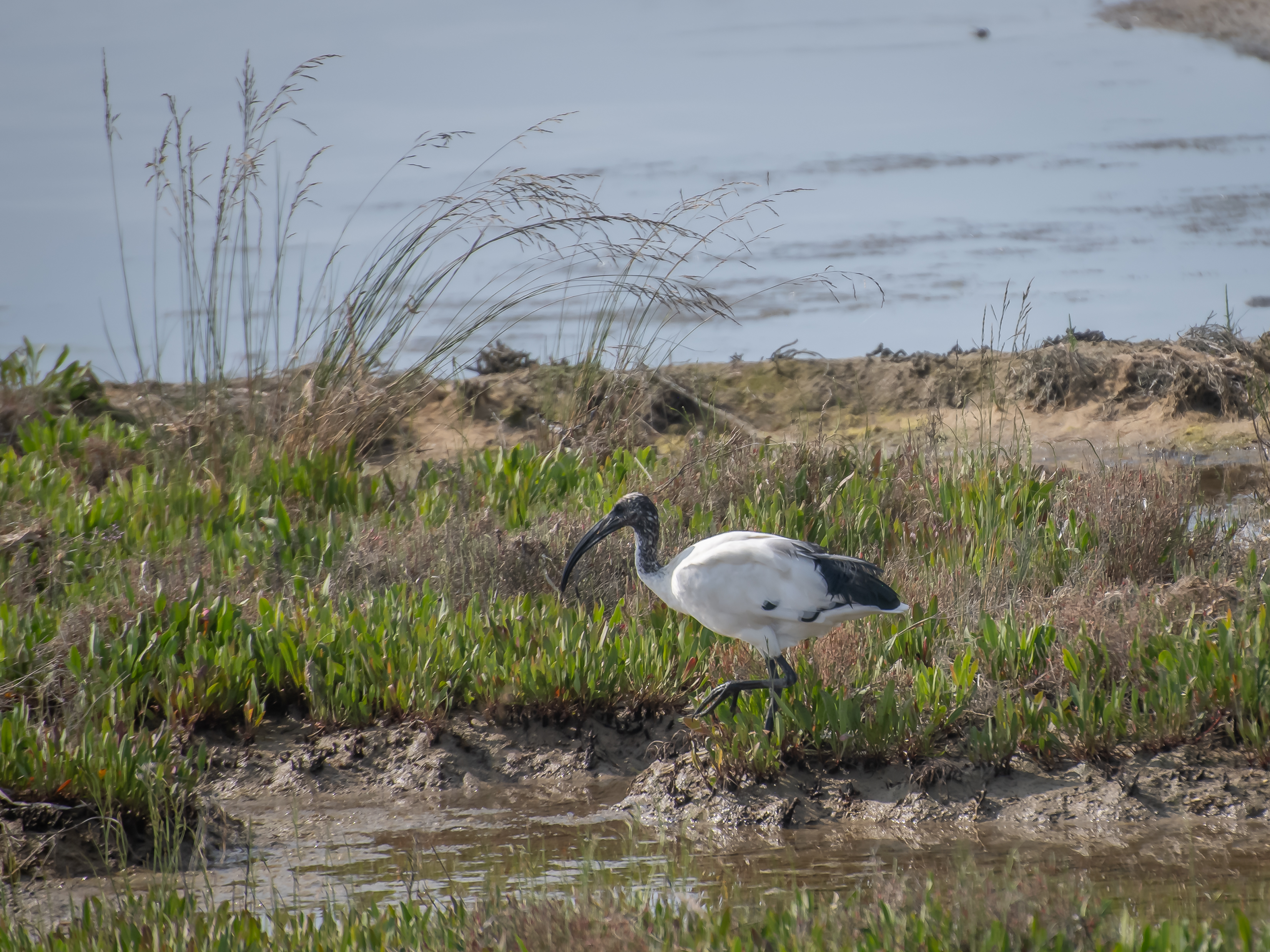
In the Venetian lagoon

In Europe, the African sacred ibis is included since 2016 in the list of Invasive Alien Species of Union concern (the Union list). This implies that this species cannot be imported, bred, transported, commercialized, or intentionally released into the environment in the whole of the European Union.

In France the African sacred ibises have become established along its Atlantic coast following the feral breeding of birds which were the offspring of a large free-flying population originating from the Branféré Zoological Gardens in southern Brittany. The first successful breeding was in 1993 at two sites, the Golfe du Morbihan and Lac de Grand-Lieu, 25 km (16 mi) and 70 km (43 mi) respectively from Branféré. By 2005 the Atlantic French breeding population was estimated at 1,100 pairs and winter censuses led to an estimated total population of up to 3,000 birds. A separate population originated from a zoo at Sigean on the Mediterranean coast of France and by 2005 the colony at the Étang de Bages-Sigean was estimated at 250 pairs. A cull was begun and by 2011 the population had fallen to 560–600 pairs. By January 2017 the eradication programme had lowered the number of birds in roosts in western France to 300–500 birds and the Lac de Grand-Lieu was the only regular breeding site in the region; as the programme has progressed the birds have become warier and the reduced numbers mean the effort and cost per bird has increased and complete eradication may never be achieved. The population near Sigean was eradicated by killing and capturing the birds with only a few remaining in the Camargue.

This species is not considered established in mainland Spain. The Barcelona Zoo kept a small free-flying population which bred in the zoo and at least once in 1974 in the surrounding city park. Between 1983 and 1985 they had increased to 18 birds, but these subsequently declined to 4–6 pairs in the 1990s and the birds were permanently caged by the end of the 1990s (the zoo still has some). In 2001 the remaining birds in the surroundings were culled, thus ending the occurrence of the species in the 'wild' in the area. However, in the early 2000s vagrants most probably from France were recorded in northern Catalonia, and sporadic observations throughout the year have been recorded since then along the Mediterranean and Cantabrian coasts. There were a total of about twenty approved records of sightings between 1994 and 2004. As of 2009, birds entering Spain from France are shot.

The population in Italy may have been introduced from the zoo Le Cornelle which has kept a free-flying group since the early 1980s, or possibly from Brittany, but this is unclear. The first pair was seen breeding in the nearby heronry at Oldenico, in Lame del Sesia Regional Park in Novara, NW Italy, in 1989. By 1998 there was a colony of 9 pairs and 48 birds there; by 2000 there were 24–26 pairs, and by 2003 there were 25–30 breeding pairs. A second colony appeared in 2004 at another nearby heronry at Casalbeltrame. These birds would mostly feed in the rice fields in the area, but would also migrate elsewhere during the summer, with the population at the roosts increasing in the winter. In 2008, the number of breeding ibis was estimated at 80–100 pairs, and at least 300 birds. That same year, six individuals, consisting of three pairs, were observed roosting at a heronry in Casaleggio. By 2009 they were said to be one of the most characteristic animals of the rice-growing area of Novara and Vercellese. In 2010 the species was reported attempting to breed in the Po Delta, northeast Italy. By 2014 reports of individuals and small flocks were recorded in various areas from the Po Valley down to Tuscany. Outside the Piedmont Region, cases of possible nesting are reported in Emilia-Romagna, Veneto and Lombardy. As of 2017 there do not seem to be coordinated control efforts in Italy.

In the Netherlands, sacred ibises were introduced from three sources; primarily from the free-flying flock at the aviary zoo Avifauna, and another group of 11 birds which escaped from a private bird trader in Weert when a tree fell on their enclosure sometime between 1998 and 2000 which would all return to their cage each winter. Furthermore, in 2000 a group of sacred ibises escaped from a zoo near Münster, some of which apparently crossed the border into Overijssel, as the colours of their rings closely matched. The free-flying Avifauna flock numbered 12 in 2001, 30 in 2003, and an estimated maximum of 41 birds escaped the zoo eventually. There had been sightings throughout the country for many years, but in 2002 successful breeding was first reported in a nature reserve some 40 km from Avifauna. By 2007 the feral population in the Netherlands had increased to 15 pairs breeding at three locations, including in a tree just outside the zoo. Pairs would regularly move from the zoo to the nature reserve in the summer and vice versa. The next year, in 2008, the tree outside the zoo was cut down, and free-flying birds were recaptured, clipped and caged. 2008/2009 was also a cold winter and many birds died. By 2009 37 birds had been recaptured and by 2010 there were no more birds breeding in the wild. The birds in Weert were halved in number after the 2008–2009 winter and had disappeared somewhere between 2011 and 2015. As of 2016 a few birds survive, some still attempting to breed in Overijssel, and handful sightings of less than three reported. Possible vagrants from France have also been noted (by their rings) after 2010.

==== Elsewhere ====
The sacred ibis is not considered invasive on the Canary Islands. It is kept in zoos on Tenerife, Gran Canaria, Lanzarote and Fuerteventura, two of which kept their collections free-flying. In 1989, the first ibis was seen in the wild. In 1997, the first pair was seen breeding outside a zoo, the population reached a maximum of 5 pairs between then and 2005, and 30 pairs is given by Clergeau & Yésou in 2006 (though this last number is untrustworthy). The birds are divided between the islands Lanzarote (near Arrecife in an old heron colony) and Fuerteventura (in the zoo near La Lajita but free-flying). On both islands, these birds have remained very near to the zoos. The breeding is 'controlled'. There is disagreement regarding the origin of other records, especially during the migratory period. Ibises have been seen on all four of the islands where there are zoos that keep them.

Introduced sacred ibises bred in the United Arab Emirates in the wildlife reserve on Sir Bani Yas Island, where 6 were introduced in the early 1980s, and which did not leave the island. There was only one left in 1989 and it died that year. Al Ain Zoo has had a flock since 1976, which had increased to some 70 birds by 1991. There are records of ibises showing up in Dubai since the 1980s. Birds in Al Ain initially stayed at the zoo, but began to fly from the zoo to the sewage treatment plant and a shallow wet area in the former public park, now luxury villa park, Ain Al Fayda, where their numbers increased slowly up to 32 in 1997 and they had bred by 1998. They were not numerous outside these locations in 2002, but by 2001 1–5 ibises would show up regularly in Dubai in such places as the golf course, the sewage treatment plant, and the construction site of the now completed Dubai International City. Breeding has since occurred in Dubai. The Dubai birds especially may be partially vagrants arrived from the Iraqi marshes, as they often show up during the migrating season. On the other hand, a bird showing up in Iran is suspected to be from the introduced UAE population. As of 2010 the population in Al Ain numbers over 75 birds, and the free-flying zoo birds roost in two subcolonies on top of their aviary. Birds regularly show up throughout the city and surrounding villages and can often be seen in the early morning in parks and roundabouts picking up scraps left by people the night before.

A breeding population was listed as introduced on Bahrain since at least 2006, but it is also said to be a vagrant on the island.

In Taiwan, the founding population escaped from a zoo prior to 1984, at which time the first wild birds were seen at Guandu in Taipei. In 1998 it was estimated that some 200 birds roamed freely, primarily in northern Taiwan. In 2010 it was added to the Checklist of Birds of Taiwan with the status of 'uncommon' (as opposed to 'rare'). By 2010 the birds were also occasionally sighted on the Matsu Islands, which are only 19 km off the coast of Fujian province in mainland China (and only a few kilometres from other coastal Chinese islands), but 190 km from Taiwan. In 2012 the population was estimated to be 500–600 individuals, and had spread to the west of Taiwan. The first attempts at culling were performed in 2012 using the egg-oiling method (unsuccessful), and by killing chicks from nests (successful). By 2016 the number was estimated at 1000 individuals, of whom around 500 inhabited a wetland in Changhua County. In 2018, the Forestry Bureau embarked on the removal of the population by cooperating with the indigenous hunters, and by August 2021, at least 16,205 birds had been removed by the program.

In Florida five individuals of the species are thought to have escaped Miami Metro Zoo, and perhaps more from private collections, after Hurricane Andrew in 1992. These birds lived in the surroundings but would return to roost at the zoo at night, and the population slowly increased to 30 or 40 by 2005. That same year two pairs were found nesting in the Everglades. Two or three years later the decision was made to remove the species. By 2009, 75 birds were removed from Florida, and the birds are believed to be eradicated.

== Ecology ==
=== Habitat ===
The African sacred ibis occurs in marshy wetlands and mud flats, both inland and on the coast. It preferably nests on trees in or near water. It feeds wading in very shallow wetlands or slowly stomping in wet pastures with soft soil. It will also visit cultivation and rubbish dumps.

=== Diet ===
The species are predators which feed primarily by day, generally in flocks. The diet consists of mainly insects, worms, crustaceans, molluscs and other invertebrates, as well as various fish, frogs, reptiles, small mammals and carrion. It may also probe into the soil with its long beak for invertebrates such as earthworms. It even sometimes feeds on seeds.

Sacred ibises were observed to occasionally feed on the contents of pelican eggs broken by Egyptian vultures in the mixed colonies of the ibises, cormorants, pelicans and Abdim's storks at Lake Shala in Ethiopia. On Central Island in Lake Turkana sacred ibises were noted to incidentally eat Nile crocodile eggs excavated by Nile monitors. Most recently, in 2006, observations were reported from a large mixed colony on Bird Island (called Penguin Island in the article) in South Africa, where 10,000 pairs of gannets nested, together with 4800 pairs of Cape cormorant and other species such as gulls and jackass penguin. Within a period of 3 years, a few specialized sacred ibis individuals out of the 400 that roosted on the island had fed on at least 152 eggs of the cormorant (other species were even more ovivorous).

In a study of pellets and stomachs contents of nestlings in the Free State, South Africa, food is mostly reported to consist of frogs (mainly Amietia angolensis and Xenopus laevis), Potamonautes warreni crabs, blow fly maggots, Sphingidae caterpillars, and adult beetles. During the first 10 days of life nestlings fed mainly on crabs and beetles, and later mainly on Sphingidae caterpillars and more beetles. The breeding colony collected different (proportions of) prey the subsequent year. The food of one one-month-old nestlings at Lake Shala, Ethiopia, consisted of beetle larvae, caterpillars and beetles. In France, adult ibises fed largely on the invasive crayfish Procambarus clarkii, for nestlings larvae of Eristalis species are important.

In France, they sometimes supplement their diet by feeding at rubbish tips in the winter.

=== Predators ===
The most important predator of nestlings of the sacred ibis in Kenya is the African fish eagle, which preferentially searches for the largest (sub-)colonies to attack, but in Ethiopia and South Africa it poses less of a threat.

=== Diseases ===
This species was reported to be susceptible to avian botulism in a list of dead animals found around a man-made lake in South Africa which tested positive for the pathogen in the late 1960s and early 1970s. During a large scale mortality of Cape cormorants from avian cholera in 1991 in western South Africa, small numbers of sacred ibis were killed. The new species Chlamydia ibidis was isolated from feral sacred ibis in France in 2013; it infected 6–7 of the 70 birds tested.

In 1887, the Italian scientist Corrado Parona reported a 3 cm Physaloptera species of nematode in the orbital cavity of a sacred ibis collected in Metemma, Abyssinia (now Ethiopia) in 1882. He thought it was perhaps a new species, as it differed morphologically from earlier seen worms. A single adult female was recovered, and it has never been seen again. As the Physaloptera species infecting birds are generally parasites of the intestines of raptors; it might be an artefact, or perhaps a misidentification, or possibly a dead-end host infection. The digenean trematode Patagifer bilobus, a fluke, has been reported from sacred ibis in Sudan before 1949. It lives in the small intestine of this species, among numerous other ibises, spoonbills, and a few other waterfowl. It has a complicated life history involving three hosts: the eggs hatch in fresh water where they infect a ram's horn snail in which they multiply and produce cercariae, which exit and encyst in a larger snail such as a Lymnaea, waiting to be eaten by a bird.

== Reproduction ==
The species usually breeds once per year in the wet season. Breeding season is from March to August in Africa, from April to May in Iraq. It builds a stick nest, often in a baobab tree. The bird nests in tree colonies, often with other large wading birds such as storks, herons, African spoonbills, African darters, cormorants. It may also form single-species groups on offshore islands or abandoned buildings. Island nests are often made on the ground. Large colonies consist of numerous subcolonies and can number 1000 birds.

Females lay one to five eggs per season, incubated by both parents for 21 to 29 days. After hatching, one parent continuously stays at the nest for the first seven days. Chicks fledge after 35 to 40 days and are independent after 44 to 48 days, reaching sexual maturity one to five years after hatching.

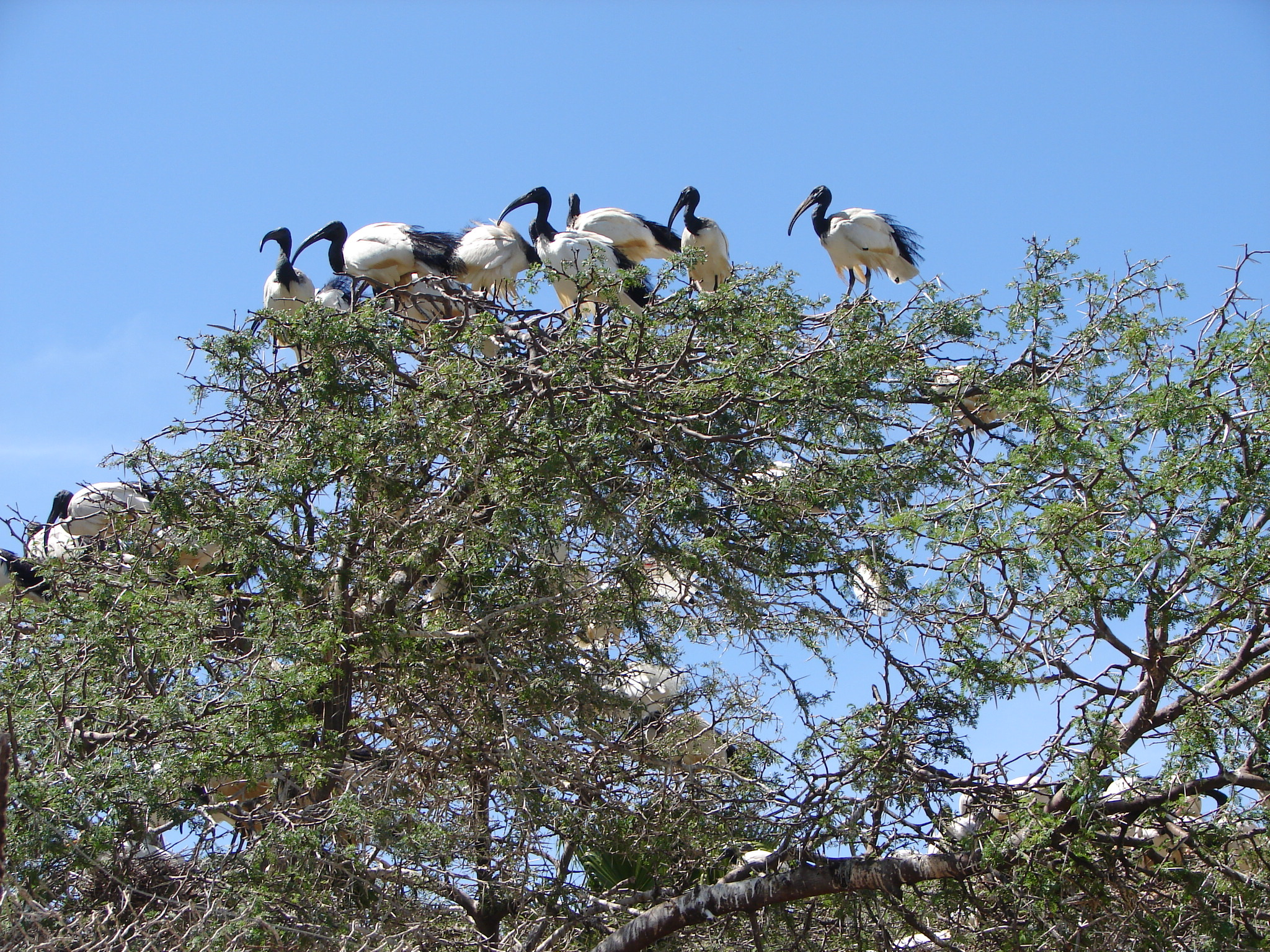
The breeding colony in Montagu, Western Cape, South Africa

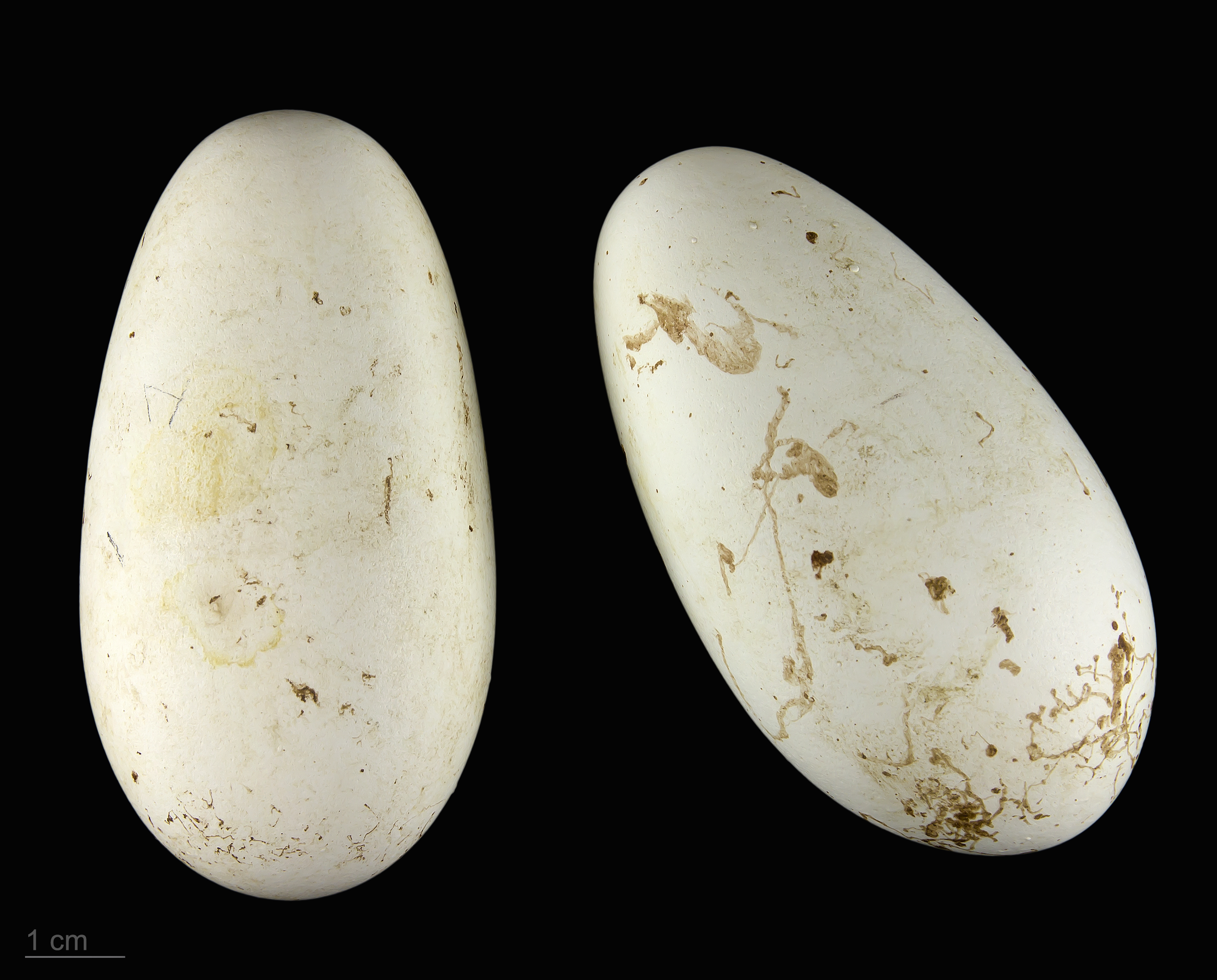
Eggs of the Threskiornis aethiopicus

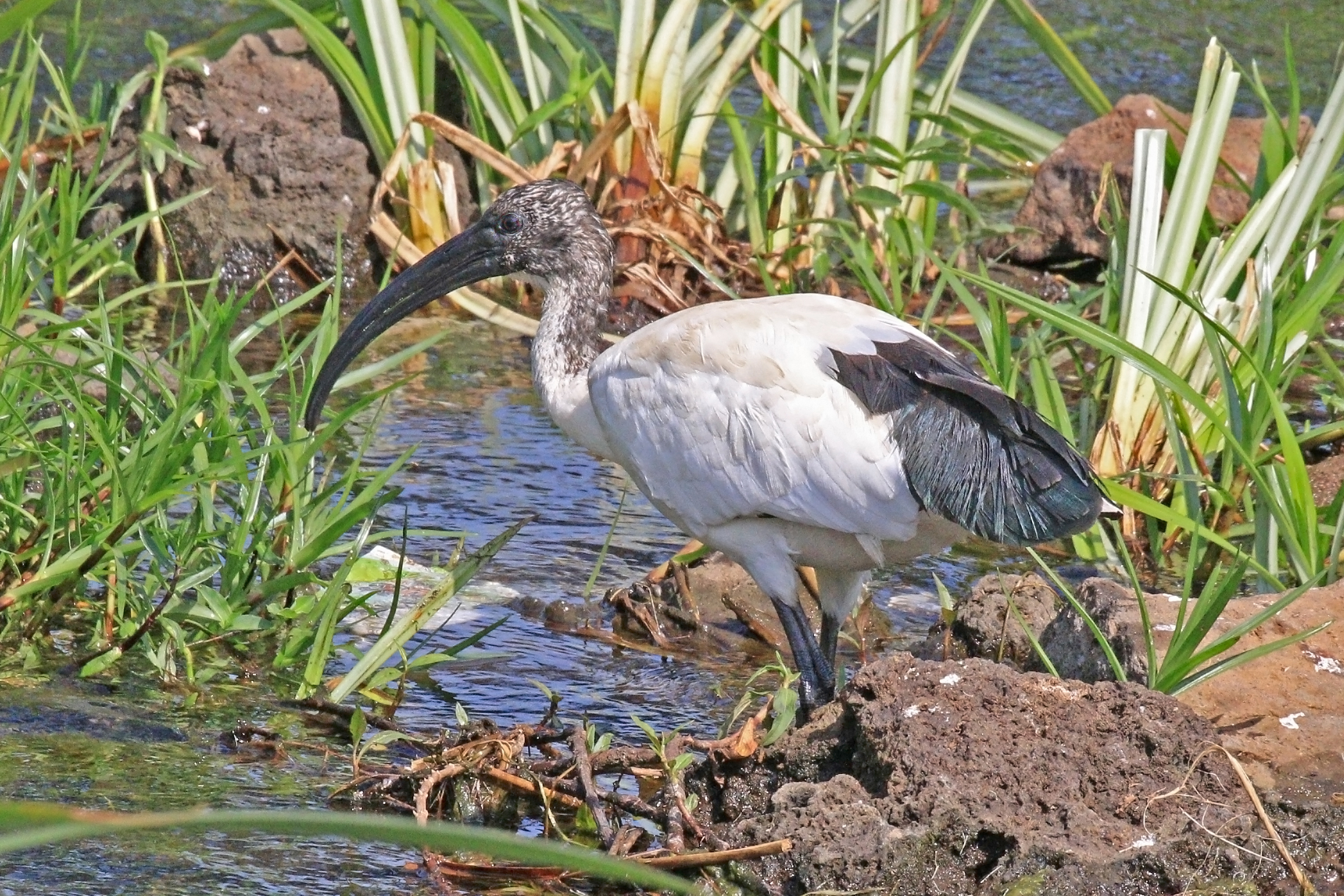
Immature sacred ibis, Uganda

== Conservation ==
The African sacred ibis is classified as "Least Concern" by the IUCN. The global population is estimated at 200,000–450,000 individuals but appears to be decreasing. It is covered by the Agreement on the Conservation of African-Eurasian Migratory Waterbirds (AEWA).

== In myth and legend ==
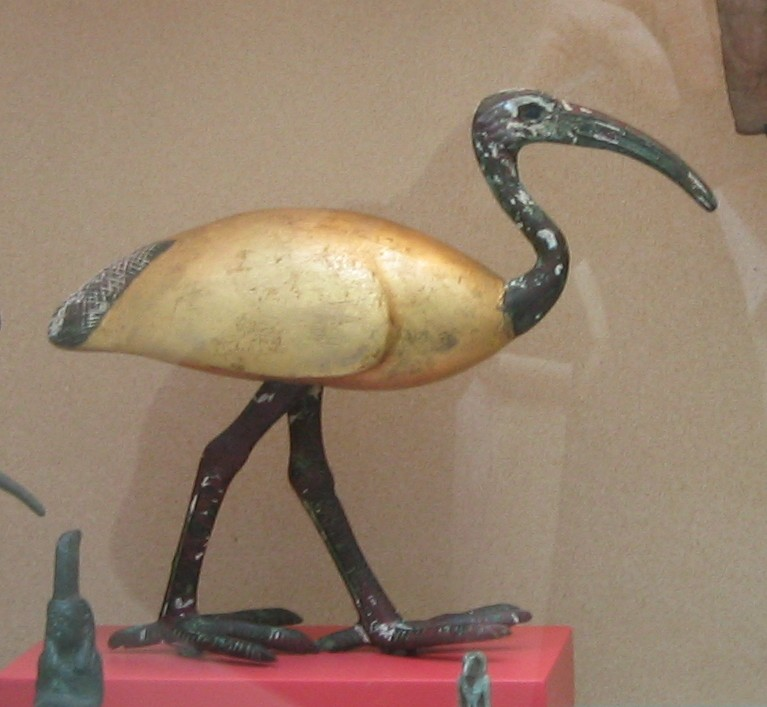
Copenhagen Museum

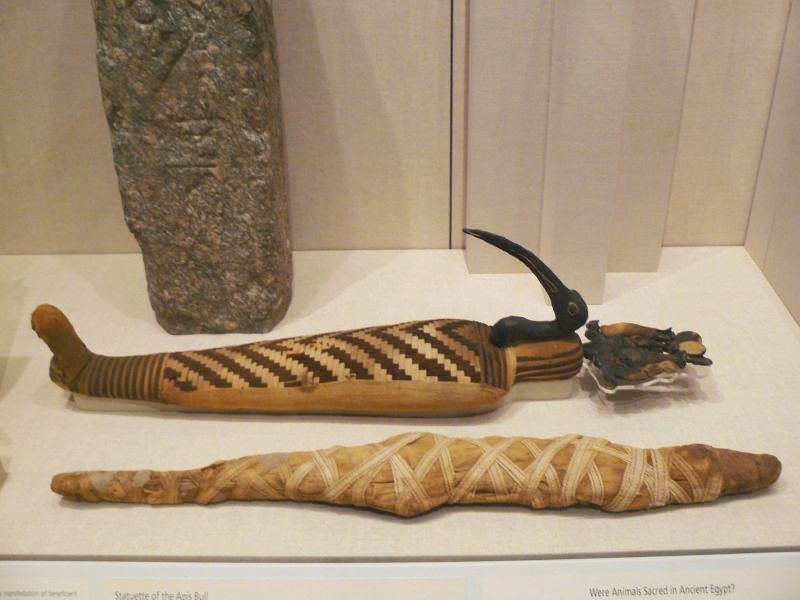
Brooklyn Museum

For many centuries, sacred ibis, along with two other species in lesser numbers, were commonly mummified by the Ancient Egyptians as a votive offering to the god Thoth. Thoth, whose head is that of an ibis, is the Ancient Egyptian god of wisdom and reason, and thus of truth, knowledge, learning and study, and writing and mathematics. The sacred ibis was considered the living incarnation of Thoth on earth. Pilgrims from all over Egypt brought thousands of ibis offerings to four or more main temples, which at their peak mummified and buried thousands of birds a year in gigantic and ancient catacombs (one complex was in operation for 700 years). Eventually, an estimated eight million birds were mummified and entombed by the Ancient Egyptians.

It has long been thought, to sustain sufficient numbers for the large and sometimes growing demand for sacrifices by the people, dozens of ibis breeding farms (called ibiotropheia by Herodotus) were established, initially throughout the regions of Egypt, but later centralised around the main temples, each producing around a thousand birds for mummies annually. An examination of the mitochondrial DNA disputes this and suggests that not only were wild birds caught and added to the captive flocks, but that they provided the bulk of the supply. The mummified birds were often young and were usually killed by breaking their neck. The head and bill were often placed between the tail feathers, and a piece of food was often placed in the bill (often a snail). The particulars of the mummification ritual often differed. The mummies could be stored in ceramic jars, wooden chests or stone sarcophagi. Not all mummies contain whole birds; some (cheaper ones) contain only a leg, an eggshell, or even dried grass from the nest. Birds were given different burials according to their status; as pets, offerings or holy individuals. Special sacred birds were afforded special mummification, transported from their cities to the temples long after normal offerings were sourced from temple farm flocks, and honoured with more luxurious burial. Different regions in Egypt observed slightly different practises regarding the ritual beliefs.

Ibis mummification started by at least 1,100 BC and petered out by approximately 30 BC. Although the numbers of burials peaked at different times depending on the region and temple, the rituals were most popular from the Late Period to the Ptolemaic Period.

Mummified specimens of the sacred ibis were brought back to Europe by Napoleon's army, where they became part of an early debate about evolution.

According to Herodotus and Pliny the Elder the ibis was invoked against incursions of winged serpents. Herodotus wrote:

There is a region moreover in Arabia, situated nearly over against the city of Buto, to which place I came to inquire about the winged serpents: and when I came thither I saw bones of serpents and spines in quantity so great that it is impossible to make report of the number, and there were heaps of spines, some heaps large and others less large and others smaller still than these, and these heaps were many in number. The region in which the spines are scattered upon the ground is of the nature of an entrance from a narrow mountain pass to a great plain, which plain adjoins the plain of Egypt; and the story goes that at the beginning of spring winged serpents from Arabia fly towards Egypt, and the birds called ibises meet them at the entrance of this country and do not suffer the serpents to go by but kill them. On account of this deed it is (say the Arabians) that the ibis has come to be greatly honored by the Egyptians, and the Egyptians also agree that it is for this reason that they honor these birds.

Josephus tells us that when Moses led the Hebrews to make war upon the Æthiopians, he brought a great number of the birds in cages of papyrus to oppose any serpents.

Due to perhaps a mistranslation of the Greek of Herodotus, before the early 18th century Europeans were convinced that these ibises had human feet.

Pliny the Elder tells us that it was said that the flies that brought pestilence died immediately upon propitiatory sacrifices of this bird.

According to Claudius Aelianus in De Natura Animalium, and Gaius Julius Solinus, both quoting much earlier but now lost authors, the sacred ibis procreates with its bill, and thus the bird is always a virgin. Aristotle, writing some 500 years earlier, also mentions this theory, but repudiates it. Picrius mentions how the venomous basilisk is hatched from the eggs of ibis, nurtured from the poisons of all the serpents the birds devour. These authors and many others also mention how crocodiles and snakes are rendered motionless after being touched by the feather of an ibis. Claudius Aelianus also says the ibis is consecrated to the moon.

Pliny and Galen ascribe the invention of the clyster (enema) to the ibis, as according to them it gave such treatments to hippopotami. Plutarch assures us it uses only salt water for this purpose. 1600 years later this was still accepted science, as Claude Perrault, in his anatomical descriptions of the bird, claimed to have found a hole in the bill which the bird used for that purpose.

In the century before the time of Christ and for at least a century after, the worship of Isis had become quite popular in Rome, especially among women, and the ibis had become one of her associated symbols. A number of frescoes and mosaics in the patrician villas of Pompeii and Herculaneum of 50BC-79AD show these birds.

According to some translations of the septuagint, the ibis is one of the unclean birds which may not be eaten (Leviticus 11:17, Deuteronomy 14:16).
