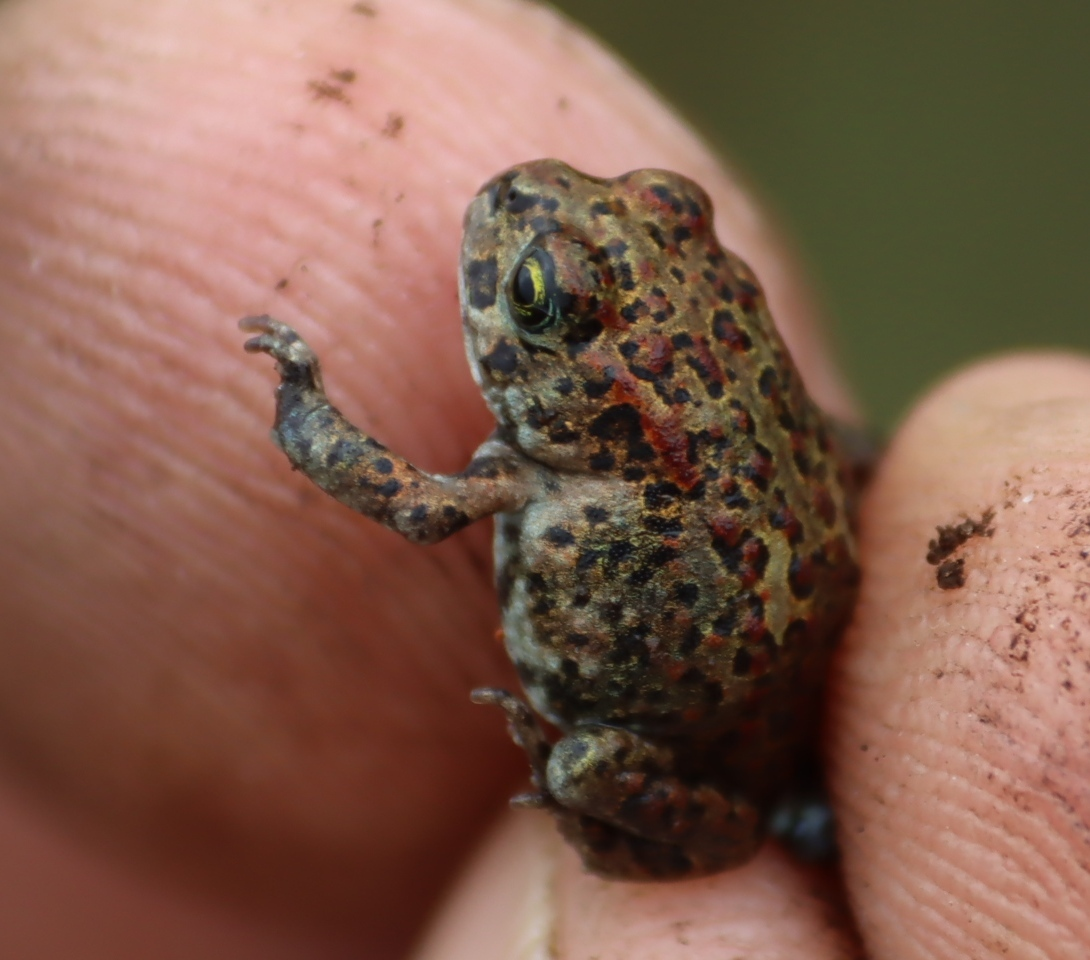

Conservation status
- Vulnerable (IUCN 3.1)

Scientific classification
- Kingdom: Animalia
- Phylum: Chordata
- Class: Amphibia
- Order: Anura
- Family: Bufonidae
- Genus: Vandijkophrynus
- Species: V. inyangae

Binomial name
- Vandijkophrynus inyangae (Poynton, 1963)

Synonyms
- Bufo gariepensis inyangae Poynton, 1963; Bufo inyangae Poynton, 1963

= Inyanga toad =

Species of amphibian

The Inyanga toad or Inyangani toad (Vandijkophrynus inyangae) is a species of toad in the family Bufonidae. It is known from the Inyanga Mountains of eastern Zimbabwe at elevations of 2,400–2,560 m (7,870–8,400 ft) asl; it is expected to occur in the adjacent Mozambique but has not been recorded there, probably because of lack of surveys. Originally described as a subspecies of Bufo gariepensis (now Vandijkophrynus gariepensis), most recent treatments have treated it as a full species.

Natural habitats of these toads are montane grasslands with granite outcrops. They hide under stones, in cracks in the granite, and in rodent burrows. Breeding takes place in temporary pools.

The species is hard to find but appears to be fairly common within its very limited range. Its habitat is relatively intact, but there is a risk of habitat loss from wood plantations, overgrazing by livestock, and human settlement. It occurs in the Nyanga National Park.
