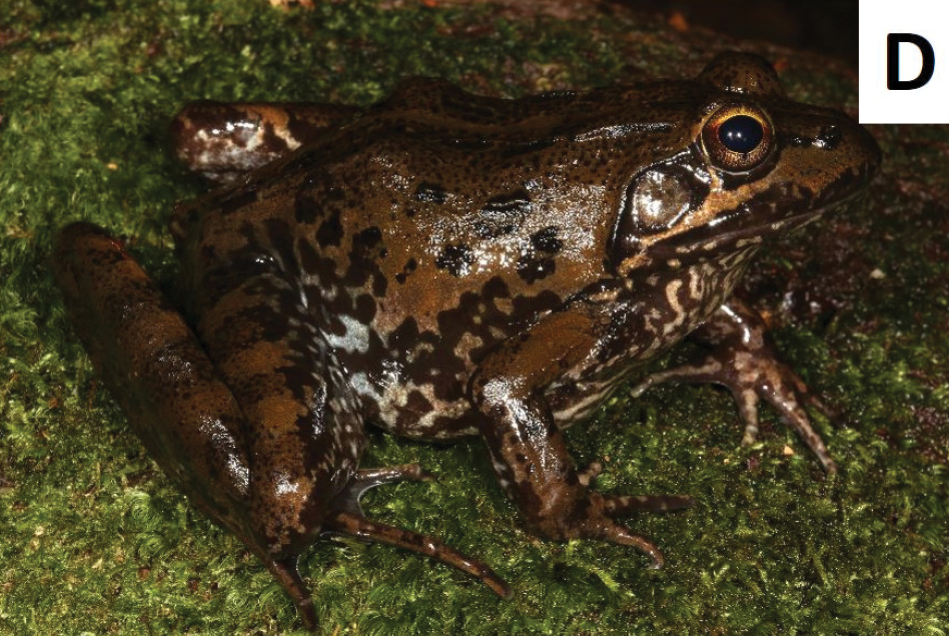

Conservation status
- Least Concern (IUCN 3.1)

Scientific classification
- Kingdom: Animalia
- Phylum: Chordata
- Class: Amphibia
- Order: Anura
- Family: Pyxicephalidae
- Genus: Amietia
- Species: A. delalandii

Binomial name
- Amietia delalandii (Duméril and Bibron, 1841)

Synonyms
- Rana Delalandii Duméril and Bibron, 1841; Rana nyassae Günther, 1893 "1892"; Rana quecketti Boulenger, 1895 "1894"; Rana Theileri Mocquard, 1906; Rana dracomontana Channing, 1978; Afrana dracomontana (Channing, 1978); Amietia dracomontana (Channing, 1978); Amietia quecketti (Boulenger, 1895)

= Amietia delalandii =

Species of amphibian

Amietia delalandii, also known as the Delalande's river frog, the Drakensberg frog, Drakensberg river frog, or Sani Pass frog, is a species of southern African river frog in the family Pyxicephalidae. It is found in Lesotho, South Africa, Mozambique, Malawi, Zimbabwe, and possibly Zambia. It is the sister species to A. vertebralis.

== Description ==
River frogs all have streamlined bodies with pointed noses and live close to water. They have well-developed hind legs and when disturbed rapidly leap into the water, where they may remain submerged for long periods.

Males reach a snout–urostyle length 58 mm (2.3 in) and females 83 mm (3.3 in). The toes are partially webbed. The colouration is variable but typically the dorsum ranges from dull brown to luminous green with a pale brown background with orange flecks, and is covered by small dark brown blotches. About half of individuals have a prominent pale vertebral stripe. The tympanum is more than half the diameter of its eye and is dark with pale flecks. The gular area is usually marbled, with the marbling extending to the chest; otherwise, the underside is unmarked and uniformly pale.

The male advertisement call is a short series of frequency-modulated clicks, followed by a pause and a brief croak. They may call singly or in groups.

== Distribution and habitat ==
Amietia delalandii is found in the highlands of southern and eastern Lesotho to above 2,000 m asl, in Natal in the permanent mountain streams originating in the Drakensberg Escarpment and with a wide distribution throughout South Africa, except in the dry west of the country. As a high-altitude stream breeder the species is vulnerable to infection by the fungus Batrachochytrium.

They are adaptable species and may be found along large and small rivers, in savanna, forest fringes, and grasslands, and in ornamental ponds at elevations of 200–1,500 m (660–4,920 ft) above sea level. Their eggs are laid individually in slow-moving to static water and the tadpoles are bottom feeders.

== Conservation status ==
It is a common and widespread species that is facing at most localized threats. It is present in several protected areas.
