= Paradise toad =

Conservation status
- Least Concern (IUCN 3.1)

Scientific classification
- Kingdom: Animalia
- Phylum: Chordata
- Class: Amphibia
- Order: Anura
- Family: Bufonidae
- Genus: Vandijkophrynus
- Species: V. robinsoni

Binomial name
- Vandijkophrynus robinsoni (Branch and Braack, 1996)

Synonyms
- Bufo robinsoni Branch and Braack, 1996

Species of amphibian

The paradise toad (Vandijkophrynus robinsoni) is a species of toad in the family Bufonidae found in Richtersveld, Bushmanland and Namaqualand regions in western South Africa (Northern Cape and Western Cape provinces) and adjacent Namibia.

Paradise toad is sympatric with the closely related karoo toad (Vandijkophrynus gariepensis). It differs from karoo toad by its characteristic call and morphological traits such as poorly developed parotoid glands, weakly developed tarsal fold, small tympanum, relatively smooth skin, and large eyes.

Its natural habitats are arid rocky areas close to permanent or seasonal water. It is potentially threatened by habitat loss caused by water extraction.
