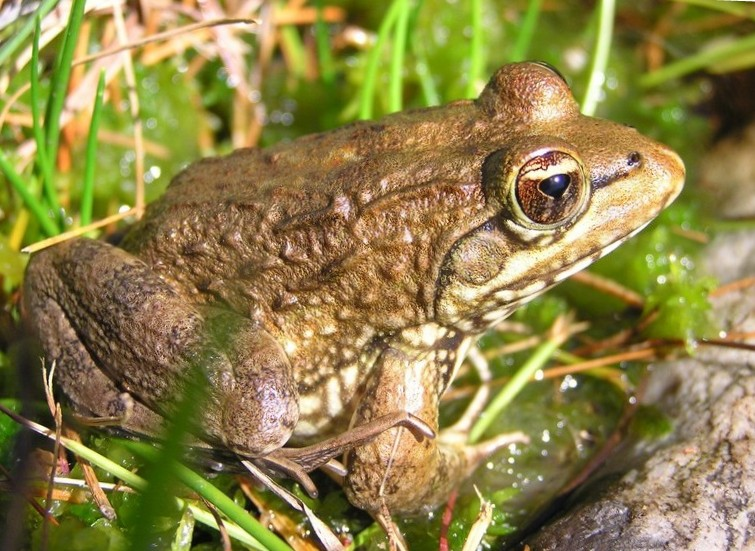

Conservation status
- Least Concern (IUCN 3.1)

Scientific classification
- Kingdom: Animalia
- Phylum: Chordata
- Class: Amphibia
- Order: Anura
- Family: Pyxicephalidae
- Genus: Amietia
- Species: A. fuscigula

Binomial name
- Amietia fuscigula (Duméril & Bibron, 1841)

Synonyms
- Afrana fuscigula (Duméril & Bibron, 1841); Rana fuscigula Duméril & Bibron, 1841

= Cape river frog =

Species of amphibian

The Cape river frog (Amietia fuscigula) is a species of frog in the family Pyxicephalidae named for the Cape of Good Hope. Formerly, it was placed in the family Ranidae. It occurs widely in the Eastern Cape and Western Cape provinces of South Africa. A newly described species, A. poyntoni, was split from this species in 2013.

== Description ==
The Cape river frog is a fairly large, typical frog with a snout-to-vent measurement of up to about 125 mm. The snout is slightly rounded. It has a powerful, athletic build with long hind legs and feet, well adapted for leaping, but also well webbed; the species is a powerful swimmer. The fore feet are not webbed. When the animal sits at rest on a level surface, the tip of the longest rear toe reaches to directly below the tympanum.

The ventral skin is smooth and white, except for dark mottling on the throat. The mottling inspired the specific epithet fuscigula: Latin for "dusky throated". In some specimens, the mottling extends to the belly. The dorsal skin bears a modest sprinkling of small, rounded protuberances and segments of longitudinal ridges. The colour scheme is variable, ranging from dark- through light-brown, also commonly green or olive, or with green streaks. The back and limbs are more or less conspicuously blotched with darker irregular spots.

Little sexual dimorphism is noted, but the male in breeding season bears a dark, swollen nuptial pad on each thumb.

The eye and tympanum are prominent; the diameter of the tympanum is barely smaller than that of the eye.

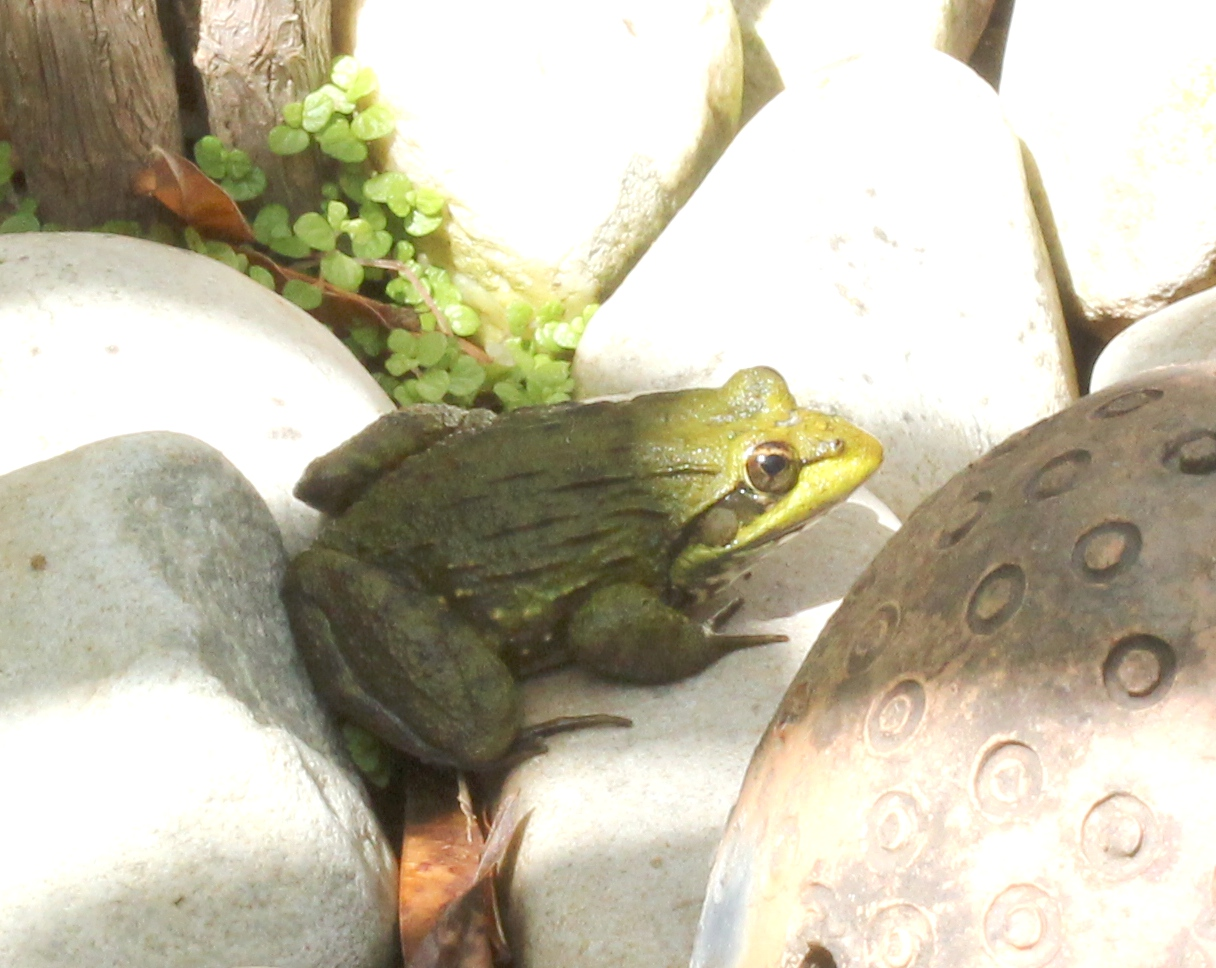
Amietia fuscigula, an olive-coloured specimen in the Western Cape, human-habituated in a suburban garden.

== Habitat ==
The Cape river frog occurs in a wide range of temperate to tropical habitats wherever fresh water is at least sufficient seasonally for breeding, including arable land, pastureland, savanna, shrubland, fynbos, grassland, rivers, swamps, freshwater lakes, marshes and springs, water storage areas, ponds, dams, and sewage treatment areas. Sometimes they even will occupy and breed in domestic water containers such as water butts or horse troughs.

== Habits ==
Amietia fuscigula is largely diurnal, though its call and breeding activity are mainly nocturnal or crepuscular. It prefers permanent water and commonly colonises dams and other artificial water bodies, but in some regions it is limited to seasonal transient water bodies. Where it occupies farm dams, it commonly emerges during the morning and takes up an inconspicuous position on the bank where it basks until the sun becomes too intense near noon. While basking, it is much sought by predators such as herons and is accordingly shy; one of its most familiar manifestations is a series of plops as frogs successively leap into the water while any threat walks by. On entering the water, the alarmed frog dives strongly and either hides under the shelter of logs or stones, or scuttles briefly about the mud, obscuring itself under the opaque cloud it has made in the water. However, in situations such as garden ponds, it readily becomes habituated to inoffensive human presence.

The voice is confusingly variable, particularly where it occurs together with several other noisy species. Males may call at any time of the year in various regions, but calling peaks in the breeding season. Typically, a call begins with a rattle of clicks about 0.1 seconds apart, like a slowly played güiro or a thumbnail run over the teeth of a comb, followed by a short series of brief croaks. Where a number of calling males compete, the calls rise in pitch, volume, and speed.

It is an active opportunistic predator, readily feeding on moderately sized invertebrates such as crickets, but also attacks small reptiles, mammals, and amphibians, including smaller members of its own species.

When it occupies streams and ditches, the Cape river frog prefers deep ponds such as occur below inlets and races where the turbulent flow hollows out convenient shelters. It also prefers deep, still water for its breeding, where its tadpoles grow fairly slowly, but achieve a large size; in shallow streams, they mature more rapidly into smaller juvenile frogs. A typical size for a mature tadpole is about 80 mm, but in deep, cool, permanent water, they might grow to twice that length. In warm shallow water with plenty of food, the period of development may take about 9 months to a year, but in cold, deep water with little food, it might take two years.

In size, shape, and their brown coloration, the tadpoles are typical of large, vigorous species of frogs; they are strong swimmers with large tails about two to three times as long as the body, and with the tip tapering to a point. The body is oval.

== Status ==
The Cape river frog, though locally threatened by habitat loss, for example because of dam building, is currently regarded as "least concern" because it occurs plentifully over wide areas, including in local isolated populations, and is not a specialist feeder. It also survives in altered habitats such as suitable pastureland and agricultural land
