= Water frog =

Water frog may refer to:

- Pelophylax, a genus of frog widespread in Eurasia, with a few species ranging into northern Africa
- Telmatobius, a genus of frog native to the Andean highlands in South America
- Ice frog (Amietia vertebralis), native to southern Africa
