= Ibrah River =

River in Sudan

Coordinates: 10°36′N 24°58′E

The Ibrah River or Wadi Ibrah (also spelt Ibra) is a river in Darfur in Sudan. It rises on the southern slopes of the Marrah Mountains, and flows south east to empty into the endorheic Lake Kundi.
