= David Eduard van Dijk =

South African scientist (1925–2023)

- Born: 14 September 1925; District Heidelberg, South Africa
- Died: 6 March 2023 (aged 97)
- Other name: Eddie
- Education: University of Witwatersrand (B.Sc); Johannesburg Teachers Training College; University of Stellenbosch (M.Sc (Zoology), 1953); University of Stellenbosch (D.Sc, 1959); University of Göttingen (Postdoctoral Studies); University of Stellenbosch (M.Sc (Geology), 2000)
- Known for: Vandijkophrynus (Van Dijk's toads); Amietia vandijki (Van Dijk's river frog)
- Spouse: Hester Edmundia (née Heese)
- Scientific career
- Fields: Herpetology, paleontology
- Workplaces: University of Cape Town; University of Natal; University of Stellenbosch

David Eduard van Dijk (14 September 1925 – 6 March 2023) was a South African herpetologist, paleontologist and the author of a number of biology textbooks.

Species named for him include the frog, Amietia vandijki (Van Dijk's river frog) (Visser & Channing)., first known only as tadpoles; the fossil plant bug, Australoprosoboloides vandijki (Riek); the plant fossil, "Estcourtia vandijki" (Anderson & Anderson) and the genus Vandijkophrynus (Van Dijk's toads)

Van Dijk published in a number of fields including Zoology, Geology, Ichnology and Paleontology over a more than 65 year academic career, with the first, his M.Sc thesis in 1955 and lastly, the publication of an article on Ichnology in 2021.

He compiled bibliographies on African Anura (Frogs and Toads), African Tadpoles, African Fossil Frogs, and African Vertebrate Ichnology (Tracks and other Trace Fossils).

Van Dijk died on 6 March 2023, at the age of 97.

== Education and career ==
Van Dijk attended school in Johannesburg and studied at the University of Witwatersrand and Johannesburg Teachers' Training College on a Transvaal Education Department Loan Bursary. He then went to Stellenbosch University where he obtained an MSc in 1953 and DSc in 1959. Somewhat more than a decade after his retirement, he undertook a second MSc (Palaeontology) at Stellenbosch University. This was awarded in 2000.

While repaying his Loan Bursary, he was a technician in the Bacteriology Laboratory of the South African Institute for Medical Research. Thereafter he lectured in the Zoology Department, University of Natal for approximately 30 years.

== Awards and honours ==
- British Association Medal (Silver) (1955)
- Junior Captain Scott Medal for Biology (1956)
- Senior Captain Scott Medal for Biology (2010)

== Selected publications ==
- van Dijk, D.E. (1955). The "Tail" of Ascaphus. (M.Sc Thesis)
- Lacey, W.S.; van Dijk, D.E.; Gordon-Gray, K.D. (1974). "New Permian Glossopteris flora from Natal". South African Journal of Science. 70: 131–141.
- van Dijk, D.E., Eriksson, Patrick G. (2021). Bipedal leaping Jurassic vertebrates in Southern Africa: proposed new ichnotaxon and inferred palaeoenvironment. Transactions of the Royal Society of South Africa. 10.1080/0035919X.2021.1964104.

== Books ==
- Smit, A.L.; van Dijk, D.E. (1970). Introduction to Modern Biology. Maskew Miller. ISBN 978-0636003811.
- van Dijk, D.E.; Channing, A (1976). A Guide to the Frogs of South West Africa. Univ.Durban-Westville Press.
- Smit, A.L.; Fox, H.E.; van Dijk, D.E.; Hennessy, E.F.; Nel, D.; Vorster, P.W. (1986). Senior Sekondêre Biologie 8. Maskew Miller Longman.
- Smit, A.L.; Fox, H.E.; van Dijk, D.E.; Hennessy, E.F.; Nel, D.; Vorster, P.W. (1986). Senior Secondary Biology 8. Maskew Miller Longman.
- Smit, A.L.; Fox, H.E.; van Dijk, D.E.; Hennessy, E.F.; Nel, D.; Van Antwerpen, A.J. (1987). Senior Secondêre Biologie 10. Maskew Miller Longman.
- Smit, A.L.; Fox, H.E.; van Dijk, D.E.; Hennessy, E.F.; Nel, D.; Van Antwerpen, A.J. (1987). Senior Secondary Biology 10. Maskew Miller Longman.
- Smit, A.L.; Fox, H.E.; van Dijk, D.E.; Hennessy, E.F.; Gebhardt, A.; Van Antwerpen, A.J. (1988). Senior Sekondêre Biologie 9. Maskew Miller Longman.
- Smit, A.L.; Fox, H.E.; van Dijk, D.E.; Hennessy, E.F.; Gebhardt, A.; Van Antwerpen, A.J. (1988). Senior Secondary Biology 9. Maskew Miller Longman.
