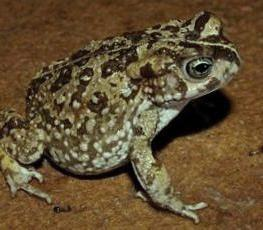
- Vandijkophrynus angusticeps

Scientific classification
- Kingdom: Animalia
- Phylum: Chordata
- Class: Amphibia
- Order: Anura
- Family: Bufonidae
- Genus: Vandijkophrynus; Frost et al., 2006

Type species
- Bufo angusticeps Smith, 1848

Diversity
- 5 species (see text)

= Vandijkophrynus =

Genus of amphibians

Vandijkophrynus, also known as Van Dijk's toads, are a small genus of true toads, family Bufonidae. They are native to Southern Africa (southern Namibia, South Africa, Lesotho, and Eswatini, Zimbabwe, and Mozamibique). The name commemorates Eddie Van Dijk, a South African herpetologist.

Originally, all Vandijkophrynus species were included in the genus Bufo as the former "Bufo angusticeps" group.

== Species ==
The species in this genus are:

- Vandijkophrynus amatolicus (Hewitt, 1925)
- Vandijkophrynus angusticeps (Smith, 1848)
- Vandijkophrynus gariepensis (Smith, 1848)
- Vandijkophrynus inyangae (Poynton, 1963)
- Vandijkophrynus nubicola (Hewitt, 1927)
- Vandijkophrynus robinsoni (Branch and Braack, 1996)
