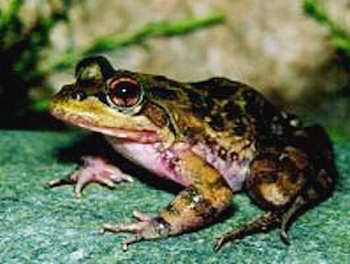

Conservation status
- Least Concern (IUCN 3.1)

Scientific classification
- Kingdom: Animalia
- Phylum: Chordata
- Class: Amphibia
- Order: Anura
- Family: Pyxicephalidae
- Genus: Amietia
- Species: A. vandijki

Binomial name
- Amietia vandijki (Visser and Channing, 1997)

Synonyms
- Afrana vandijki Visser and Channing, 1997

= Amietia vandijki =

Van Dijk's river frog

Species of frog

Amietia vandijki, also known as Van Dijk's river frog, is a species of frog in the family Pyxicephalidae. It is endemic to South Africa. The name commemorates Eddie Van Dijk, a South African herpetologist.

Its natural habitats are temperate forest, Mediterranean-type shrubby vegetation, and rivers. It is threatened by habitat loss.
