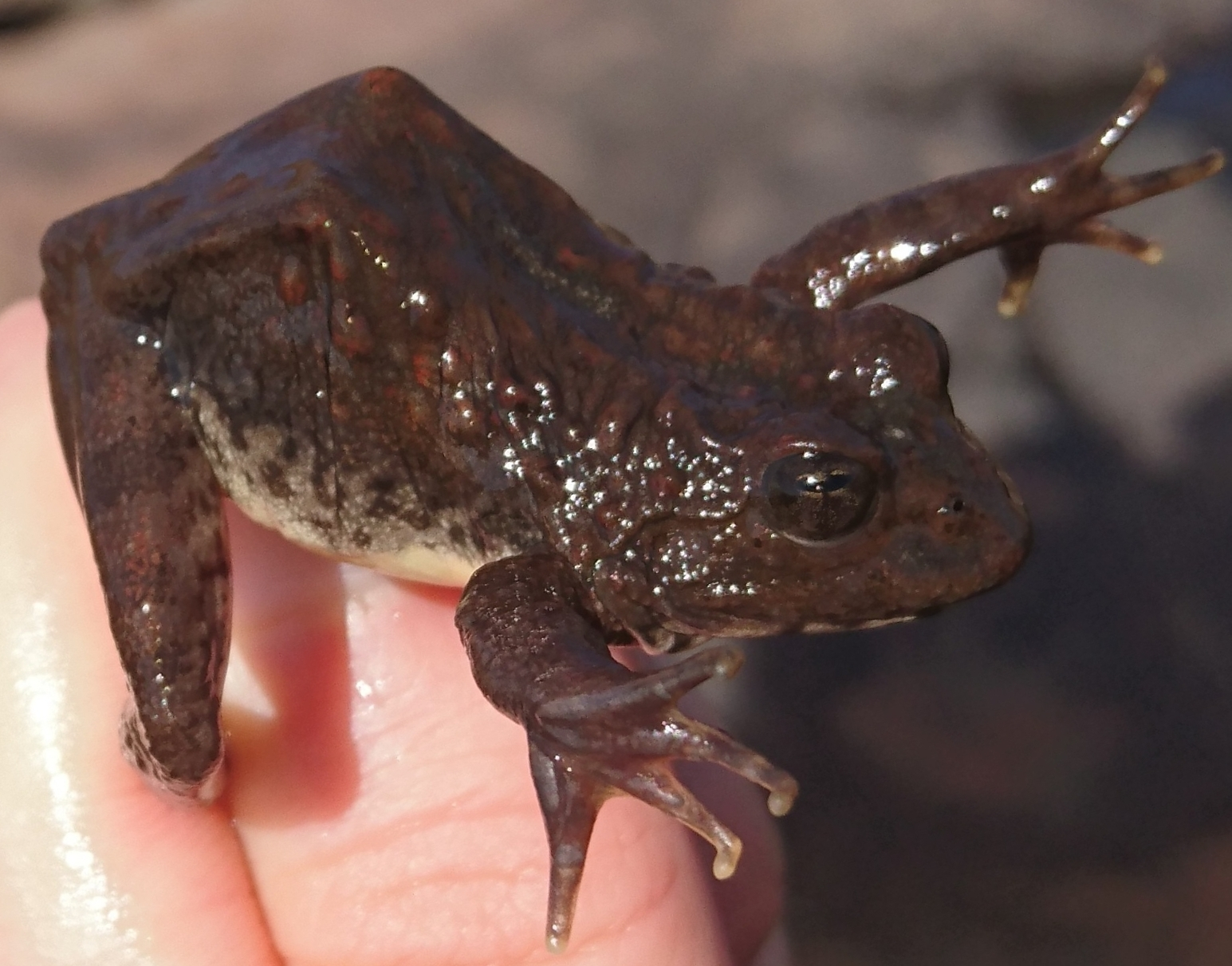

Conservation status
- Vulnerable (IUCN 3.1)

Scientific classification
- Kingdom: Animalia
- Phylum: Chordata
- Class: Amphibia
- Order: Anura
- Family: Pyxicephalidae
- Genus: Amietia
- Species: A. hymenopus

Binomial name
- Amietia hymenopus (Boulenger, 1920)

Synonyms
- Rana hymenopus Boulenger, 1920; Strongylopus hymenopus (Boulenger, 1920); Phrynobatrachus lawrencei FitzSimons, 1947; Rana draconensis FitzSimons, 1948

= Amietia hymenopus =

Species of amphibian

Amietia hymenopus is a species of frog in the family Pyxicephalidae. It is found in the Drakensberg Mountains and Lesotho Highlands in northeastern Lesotho and adjacent South Africa. This species has many common names: Phofung river frog, Berg stream frog, Drakensberg river frog, Natal Drakensberg frog, Drakensberg frog, and Drakensberg rana.

== Description ==
The maximum reported size for this species is 65 mm (2.6 in) in snout–urostyle length. In a smaller sample, the largest male was 41 mm (1.6 in) and the largest female was 49 mm (1.9 in) in snout–urostyle length. The back is very warty but there are no longitudinal skin ridges; a white glandular ridge runs from below the eye to the arm insertion. The tympanum is dark. The lips are marbled. The gular region is speckled or mottled while the belly is immaculate. There are two common dorsal patterns. One pattern is characterized by a pale background with olive markings; there are two dark "V" markings; a backward-facing one between the eyes, and another, forward-facing one at the level of the pectoral girdle. There is a white or grey, slightly elongated blotch located on the midline within this mark. The other pattern consists of a brown background with dark brown markings. The warts are slightly paler, and there is a pale patch on the midline, just behind the pectoral girdle.

== Habitat and conservation ==
Amietia hymenopus inhabit high-altitude riverine grasslands at elevations of 1,800–3,000 m (5,900–9,800 ft) above sea level. Adults may be observed basking on rocks. Breeding takes place throughout the year in seepage areas on rocky stream banks or near the edges of pools. The eggs are laid in water. Tadpoles can be active even under ice.

This species is suffering from chytrid infections. Drying of streams and severe freezing in winter can cause large die-offs of tadpoles. Trampling and grazing are also threats. The species' range includes the uKhahlamba-Drakensberg Park in South Africa.
