= Amietia ruwenzorica =

Conservation status
- Least Concern (IUCN 3.1)

Scientific classification
- Kingdom: Animalia
- Phylum: Chordata
- Class: Amphibia
- Order: Anura
- Family: Pyxicephalidae
- Genus: Amietia
- Species: A. ruwenzorica

Binomial name
- Amietia ruwenzorica (Laurent, 1972)

Synonyms
- Rana ruwenzorica Laurent, 1972; Afrana ruwenzorica (Laurent, 1972)

Species of frog

Amietia ruwenzorica (Ruwenzori Range frog or Ruwenzori river frog) is a species of frog in the family Pyxicephalidae. It is found in the eastern Democratic Republic of the Congo and western Uganda, including the eponymous Rwenzori Mountains on the Uganda/DRC border as well as Kabobo Plateau and Itombwe Mountains in DRC.

== Description ==
Adult males can grow to 71 mm (2.8 in) and adult females to 86 mm (3.4 in) in snout–vent length. The toes are partially webbed. Skin is smooth in females and spiny in males. The supratympanic fold is nearly straight. The dorsolateral ridges are narrow and distinct. The dorsum is pale tan with irregular small dark brown marks. The dorsolateral folds are marked by narrow longitudinal marks. The nostril is surrounded by a dark spot that extends as a thin line to the eye, encloses the dark tympanum, and finally tapers to the arm insertion. The limbs have narrow dark crossbars. The ventral surfaces are white to yellow; brown mottling is sometimes present.

A tadpole in Gosner stage 34 measures 57 mm (2.2 in) in total length, two thirds of which is tail. The body is streamlined, with the oral disc forming a wide sucker.

== Habitat and conservation ==
Amietia ruwenzorica occurs in submontane and montane rainforests at elevations of 700–2,500 m (2,300–8,200 ft) above sea level. It lives in and around streams, it breeding habitat. Reproduction takes place in the dry season.

This species is threatened by the general decline in the quality and extent of its habitat, caused by expanding human settlements, wood collection and logging, and agricultural expansion. Artisanal mining could be a threat in some areas where this species is suspected to occur. It occurs in several protected areas: Virunga National Park, Itombwe Nature Reserve, and Kabobo Natural Reserve in the Democratic Republic of the Congo, and Rwenzori Mountains National Park in Uganda.
