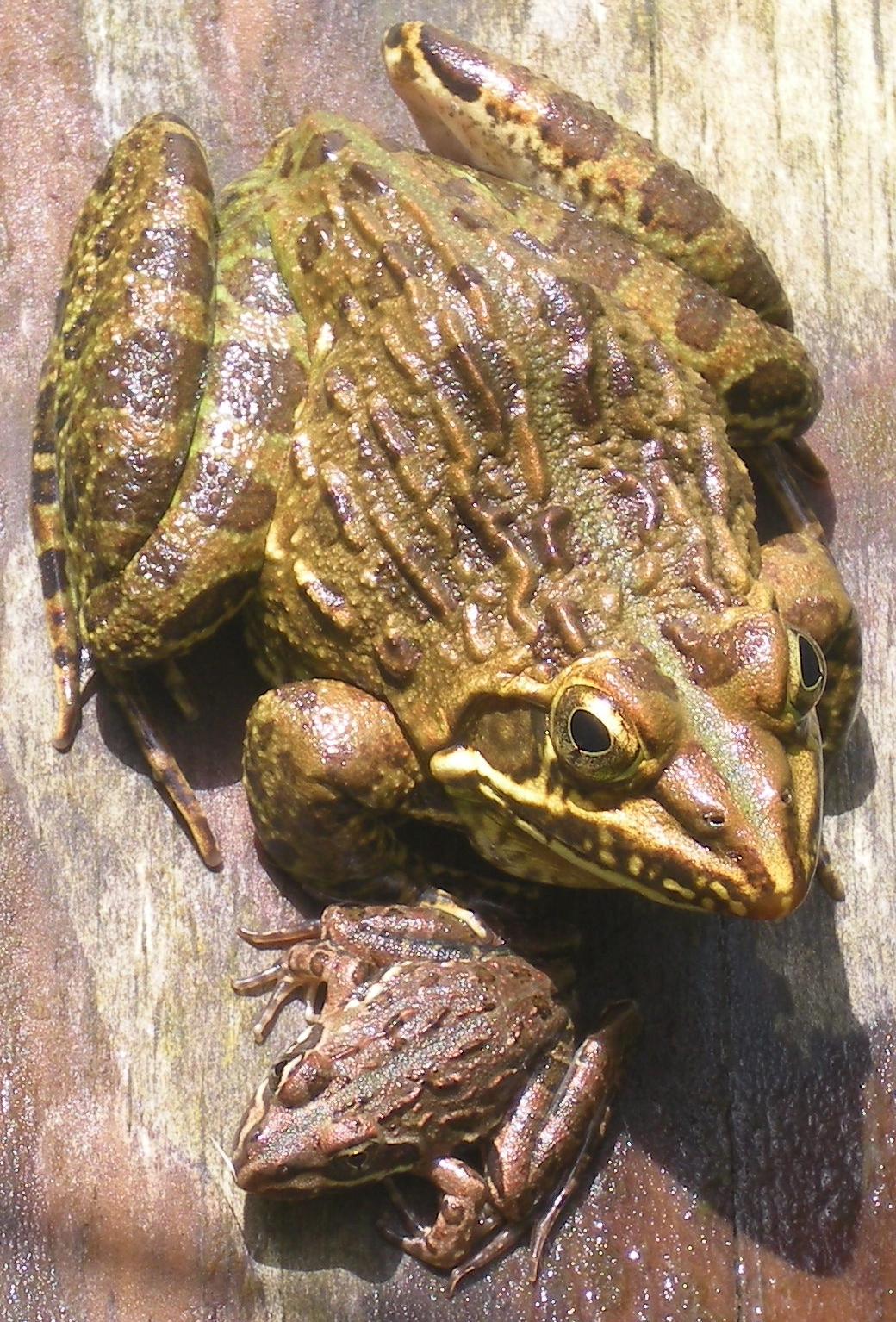
- Amietia angolensis (Angola river frog)

Scientific classification
- Kingdom: Animalia
- Phylum: Chordata
- Class: Amphibia
- Order: Anura
- Family: Pyxicephalidae
- Subfamily: Cacosterninae
- Genus: Amietia; Dubois, 1987

Synonyms
- Afrana Dubois, 1992

= Amietia =

Genus of amphibians

Amietia is a genus of frogs, commonly known as large-mouthed frogs or river frogs, in the family Pyxicephalidae. They are endemic to central and southern Africa. Formerly, the genus was named Afrana and was placed in the family Ranidae.

== Etymology ==
The generic name, Amietia, is in honor of French herpetologist Jean-Louis Amiet.

== Species ==
The following species are recognised in the genus Amietia:

- Amietia angolensis (Bocage, 1866), Angola river frog, common river frog
- Amietia chapini (Noble, 1924)
- Amietia delalandii (Duméril and Bibron, 1841)
- Amietia desaegeri (Laurent, 1972)
- Amietia fuscigula (A.M.C. Duméril and Bibron, 1841), Cape river frog
- Amietia hymenopus (Boulenger, 1920)
- Amietia inyangae (Poynton, 1966), Inyangani river frog
- Amietia johnstoni (Günther, 1894), Johnston's river frog
- Amietia moyerorum (Channing, Dehling, Lötters, and Ernst, 2016)
- Amietia nutti (Boulenger, 1896)
- Amietia poyntoni (Channing and Baptista, 2013)
- Amietia ruwenzorica (Laurent, 1972)
- Amietia tenuoplicata (Pickersgill, 2007)
- Amietia vandijki (Visser and Channing, 1997)
- Amietia vertebralis (Hewitt, 1927), Ice frog
- Amietia wittei (Angel, 1924)
