= Amietia chapini =

Conservation status
- Least Concern (IUCN 3.1)

Scientific classification
- Kingdom: Animalia
- Phylum: Chordata
- Class: Amphibia
- Order: Anura
- Family: Pyxicephalidae
- Genus: Amietia
- Species: A. chapini

Binomial name
- Amietia chapini (Noble, 1924)

Synonyms
- Rana chapini Noble, 1924; Rana amieti Laurent, 1976; Afrana amieti (Dubois, 1992); Amietia amieti Frost et al., 2006

Species of amphibian

Amietia chapini, commonly called Chapin's river frog, is a species of frog in the family Pyxicephalidae. It was formerly placed in the family Ranidae.

== Distribution and habitat ==
It is endemic to the Pangi Territory of the Democratic Republic of the Congo. Its natural habitats are subtropical or tropical moist lowland forests and rivers.
