= Johnston's river frog =

Conservation status
- Endangered (IUCN 3.1)

Scientific classification
- Kingdom: Animalia
- Phylum: Chordata
- Class: Amphibia
- Order: Anura
- Family: Pyxicephalidae
- Genus: Amietia
- Species: A. johnstoni

Binomial name
- Amietia johnstoni (Günther, 1894)

Synonyms
- Rana johnstoni Günther, 1894; Afrana johnstoni (Günther, 1894)

Species of amphibian

Johnston's river frog (Amietia johnstoni), or Tshiromo frog, is a species of frog in the family Pyxicephalidae. It is endemic to Malawi.

Its natural habitats are tropical moist montane forests, high-altitude grassland, and rivers. It is threatened by habitat loss.
