= Amatola toad =

Conservation status
- Critically Endangered (IUCN 3.1)

Scientific classification
- Kingdom: Animalia
- Phylum: Chordata
- Class: Amphibia
- Order: Anura
- Family: Bufonidae
- Genus: Vandijkophrynus
- Species: V. amatolicus

Binomial name
- Vandijkophrynus amatolicus (Hewitt, 1925)

Synonyms
- Bufo angusticeps amatolica Hewitt, 1925; Bufo amatolicus Hewitt, 1925

Species of amphibian

The Amatola toad (Vandijkophrynus amatolicus) is a species of toad in the family Bufonidae. It is endemic to the Eastern Cape province, South Africa, where it is known from the Winterberg and Amathole Mountains. The specific name refers to the type locality, "Amatola Range, near Hogsback".

== Description ==
Amatola toads are small toads, with females reaching 38 mm (1.5 in) in snout–vent length. The dorsum is usually uniform dark grey or olive-brown with a distinct, pale, vertebral stripe. Parotoid glands are well developed. There are numerous small, flattened warts on the dorsal surface. The tadpoles are brown in colour.

== Habitat and conservation ==
Its natural habitats are high-altitude moist grasslands. Reproduction takes place in shallow temporary pools and seepages, including pools formed in vehicle tracks.

The species is known to congregate in large numbers to breed. However, it was not observed in 1998–2009 despite numerous searches, and the species was feared to be extinct. In 2011, an adult female and many tadpoles were again discovered, on a site that had been searched before. Detection seems to require suitable weather, i.e., heavy rains that trigger breeding.

The main threats to Amatola toad are loss of grassland through afforestation, overgrazing, and fires. Forestry vehicle use during the breeding season can be detrimental to the tadpoles and breeding adults.
