= Lake Kundi =

Lake in Sudan

Coordinates: 10°30′N 25°16′E

Lake Kundi (Swahili: "group") is located in South Darfur, Sudan, Africa. The perennial, endorheic lake is situated at the mouth of Ibrah River, near the seasonal Bahr al-Arab. The nearest town is Al-Fashir, 350 kilometres (220 mi) to the north. The 20 square kilometres (7.7 sq mi) lake reaches 1,200 hectares (3,000 acres) at high water, shrinking to 100–200 hectares (250–490 acres) in the dry season. The lake is shallow, 2–3 metres (6 ft 7 in – 9 ft 10 in) in depth, depending upon the season. The lake is situated at an altitude of 460 metres (1,510 ft) above sea level. Radom National Park is located to the southwest.

== Flora and fauna ==
Its vegetation is characterized by Ceratophyllum demersum and Nymphaea lotus.

Clarias lazera and Tilapia zillii fish species are found here, and there is an artisanal fishery. Lake Kundi includes the protomonad Rhipidodendron huxleyi, a faunal species previously not recorded in Africa.

Of the avifauna, 5000-7000 Sudan crowned crane have been reported. Other bird life includes yellow-billed stork, Abdim's stork, African sacred ibis, Arabian bustard, African collared dove, golden nightjar, red-throated bee-eater, yellow-billed shrike, piapiac, red-pate cisticola, foxy cisticola, cricket longtail, Senegal eremomela, chestnut-bellied starling, black scrub-robin, chestnut-crowned sparrow-weaver, bush petronia, black-rumped waxbill.

== Conservation ==
Lake Kundi is classified as an Important Bird Area. The Lake Kundi Bird Sanctuary is an Animal sanctuary whose 2,000 hectares (4,900 acres) protected area includes the lake.
