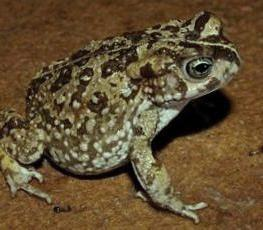

Conservation status
- Least Concern (IUCN 3.1)

Scientific classification
- Kingdom: Animalia
- Phylum: Chordata
- Class: Amphibia
- Order: Anura
- Family: Bufonidae
- Genus: Vandijkophrynus
- Species: V. angusticeps

Binomial name
- Vandijkophrynus angusticeps (Smith, 1848)

Synonyms
- Bufo angusticeps Smith, 1848

= Sand toad =

Cape sand toad

Species of amphibian

The sand toad, Cape sand toad, common Cape toad, or narrow-headed toad (Vandijkophrynus angusticeps) is a species of toad in the family Bufonidae (true toads). It is endemic to South Africa and found in southwestern and southern part of Western Cape Province to extreme southwestern Eastern Cape Province, from Nieuwoudtville in the west to Humansdorp in the east, along the coastal flats and Cape Fold Mountains from the sea level to 1,500 m (4,900 ft) asl.

== Description ==
Sand toads are morphologically similar to other Vandijkophrynus species, but can usually be distinguished by their unspotted white ventrum and bright yellow flush over the dorsal surfaces of their feet.

== Reproduction ==
Sand toads may emerge from their refuges to breed in winter, May–September, when heavy rains have saturated the soil and created pools lasting for many weeks. They breed in temporary depressions in sandy areas, and also in clay soils. Males call on exposed sites near the water's edge. Testes are unusually large, suggesting intense male-male competition.

== Habitat and conservation ==
Sand toads inhabit fynbos heathland. They can sometimes also survive in agricultural areas.

The species is threatened by habitat loss and deterioration caused by coastal development, alien plants, and wetland drainage for urbanization and agriculture. It has disappeared from some areas, but is believed to be stable and common through most of its range.
