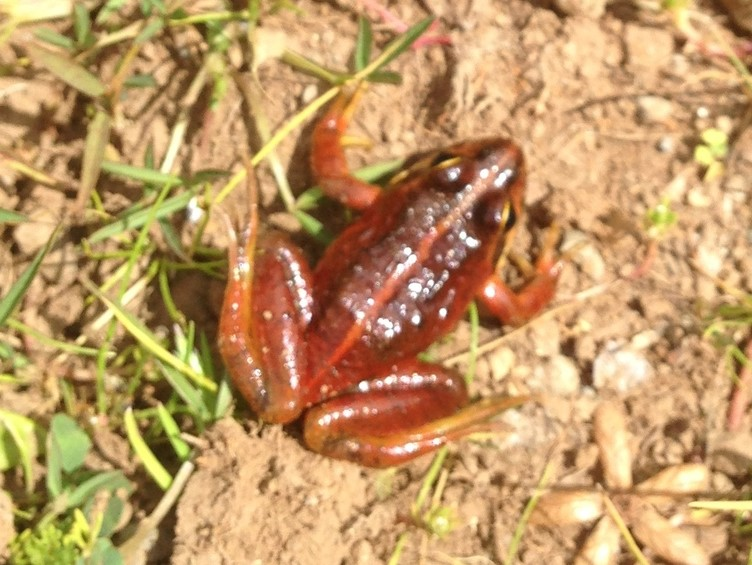

Conservation status
- Least Concern (IUCN 3.1)

Scientific classification
- Kingdom: Animalia
- Phylum: Chordata
- Class: Amphibia
- Order: Anura
- Family: Pyxicephalidae
- Genus: Amietia
- Species: A. wittei

Binomial name
- Amietia wittei (Angel, 1924)

Synonyms
- Phrynobatrachus Wittei Angel, 1924; Rana wittei (Angel, 1924); Afrana wittei (Angel, 1924)

= Amietia wittei =

Species of frog

Amietia wittei (common names: Molo frog, De Witte's river frog) is a species of frog in the family Pyxicephalidae. It is found in Kenya and Tanzania, including Mount Elgon in the Kenya/Uganda border region. Its type locality is in Molo, Kenya, located near the top of the Mau Escarpment. The specific name wittei honours Gaston-François de Witte, a Belgian naturalist.

== Description ==
Adult males reach 55 mm (2.2 in) and adult females 87 mm (3.4 in) in snout–urostyle length. The dorsal ground colour is a dark brown, becoming lighter on the flanks and yellowish on to the belly. The dorsolateral folds are black, and so are many of the elongated warts on the back. A row of irregular dark blotches runs from the groin towards the tympanum. Some specimens have a pale (bright green) vertebral stripe. The upper lip is uniformly dark or marbled; a pale (coppery) band above the upper lip extends between the tympanum and eye, touching the eye. The lower lip is marbled.

== Habitat and conservation ==
Amietia wittei is a locally common species inhabiting montane grasslands at elevations of 1,100–3,300 m (3,600–10,800 ft) above sea level. It is associated with streams and can be found in areas of low-intensity agriculture. It is suffering from some habitat loss and deterioration caused by expanding human settlements, wood collection, and logging. It occurs in several national parks: Aberdare and Mount Kenya National Parks in Kenya, Mount Elgon National Park in Kenya/Uganda, and Kilimanjaro National Park in Tanzania.
