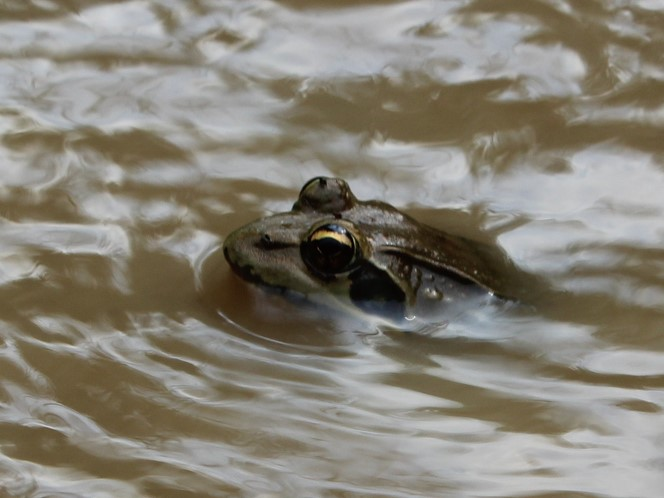

Conservation status
- Least Concern (IUCN 3.1)

Scientific classification
- Kingdom: Animalia
- Phylum: Chordata
- Class: Amphibia
- Order: Anura
- Family: Pyxicephalidae
- Genus: Amietia
- Species: A. desaegeri

Binomial name
- Amietia desaegeri (Laurent, 1972)

Synonyms
- Rana desaegeri Laurent, 1972; Afrana desaegeri (Laurent, 1972)

= Amietia desaegeri =

Species of frog

Amietia desaegeri is a species of frog in the family Pyxicephalidae. It is found west and south of the Rwenzori Mountains in eastern Democratic Republic of the Congo and north-western Rwanda. The common names Byangolo frog and De Saeger's river frog have been coined for it.

== Description ==
Males grow to at least 78 mm (3.1 in) and female to 76.5 mm (3.01 in) in snout–urostyle length. Skin is smooth but there are two dorso-lateral folds that running from the eyes to the inguinal region. The dorsum is pale beige, with brown infusions but no distinct markings; vertebral stripe is absent. There is a pale band between the eyes and between the tympanum and eye. The nostrils are dark and a thin dark line runs from the nostril to the eye. The tympanum is pale at its centre. The supratympanic fold is cream. The fingers and toes are pale. There are poorly contrasted transverse bars on the femur and tibia are thin.

== Habitat and conservation ==
This species inhabits submontane and montane rainforests at elevations of 1,000–3,500 m (3,300–11,500 ft) above sea level. It lives in and around streams, its presumed breeding habitat. It can be locally abundant and tolerates a high degree of habitat disturbance; no major threats are known. It occurs in the Virunga National Park in the Democratic Republic of the Congo and the Gishwati Forest Reserve in Rwanda.
