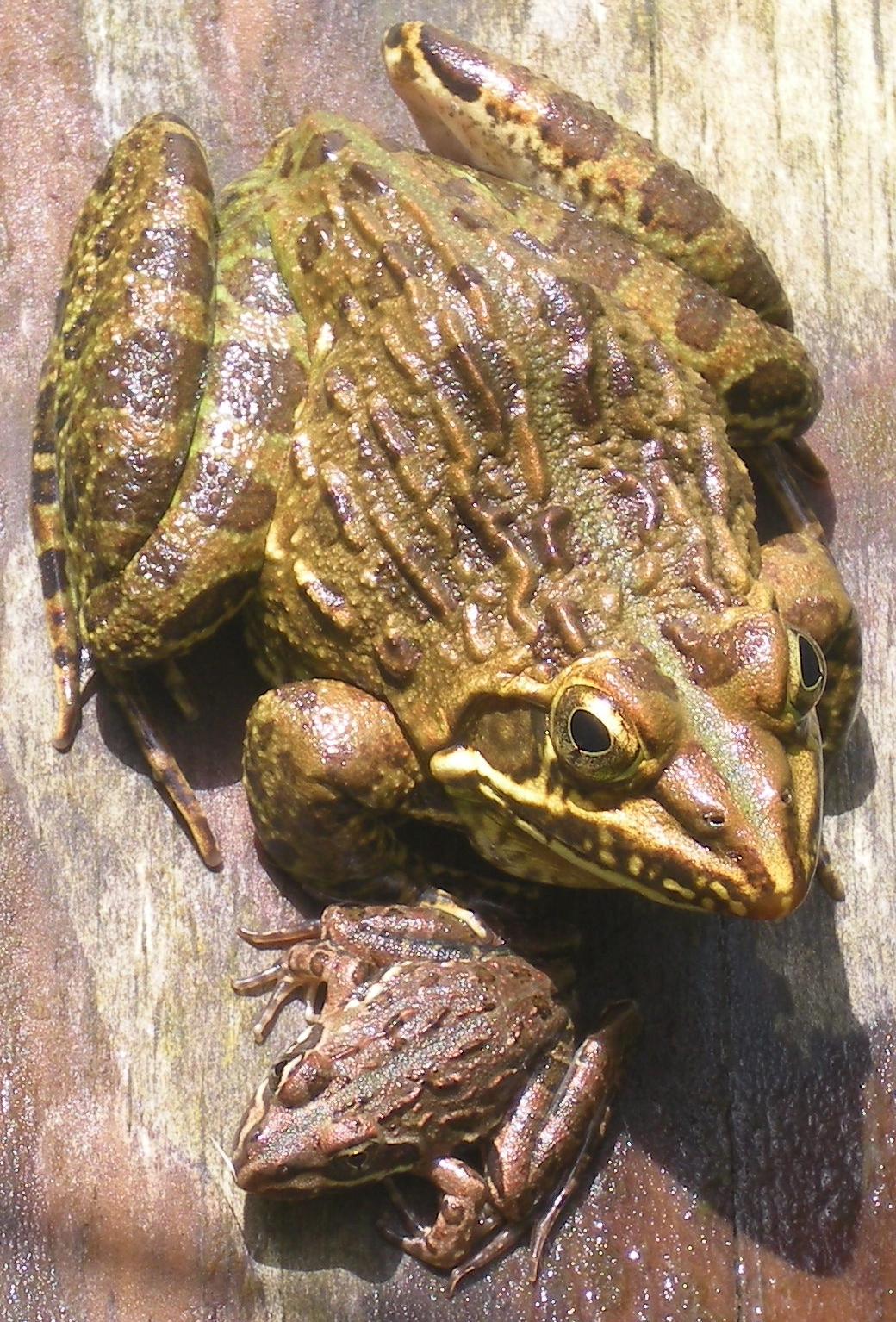

Conservation status
- Least Concern (IUCN 3.1)

Scientific classification
- Kingdom: Animalia
- Phylum: Chordata
- Class: Amphibia
- Order: Anura
- Family: Pyxicephalidae
- Genus: Amietia
- Species: A. angolensis

Binomial name
- Amietia angolensis (Bocage, 1866)

Subspecies
- Kenyan river frog; Mozambique river frog

Synonyms
- Afrana angolensis

= Angola river frog =

Species of amphibian

The Angola river frog (Amietia angolensis), or common river frog, is a species of frog in the family Pyxicephalidae. Formerly, it was placed in the family Ranidae.

== Distribution and habitat ==
It is found in southern and eastern Africa (in places like South Africa, the Democratic Republic of the Congo, the Eastern Highlands of Mozambique and Zimbabwe, and Angola)

Its natural habitats are subtropical or tropical moist lowland forests, subtropical or tropical moist montane forests, dry savanna, moist savanna, subtropical or tropical moist shrubland, subtropical or tropical dry lowland grassland, subtropical or tropical seasonally wet or flooded lowland grassland, subtropical or tropical high-altitude grassland, rivers, swamps, freshwater lakes, freshwater marshes, arable land, pastureland, rural gardens, urban areas, heavily degraded former forest, ponds, and canals and ditches.

It is not considered threatened by the IUCN.

== Diet and predators ==
Like other frogs, this frog feeds on worms and insects, such as locust. It is a prey to crocodiles, shoebills, and snakes.
