= Amietia poyntoni =

Conservation status
- Least Concern (IUCN 3.1)

Scientific classification
- Kingdom: Animalia
- Phylum: Chordata
- Class: Amphibia
- Order: Anura
- Family: Pyxicephalidae
- Genus: Amietia
- Species: A. poyntoni

Binomial name
- Amietia poyntoni Channing and Baptista, 2013
- IUCN range 2026

Species of South African endemic frog

Amietia poyntoni, commonly known as Poynton's river frog, is a species of southern African aquatic frog in the family Pyxicephalidae.

== Distribution ==
Poynton's river frog is found in South Africa, Lesotho and Namibia; from the southern Drakensberg mountains to the southern Karoo, and northwards through Namaqualand to the Namib-Naukluft Park in Namibia.

== Habitat ==
Poynton's river frog is found in inland water regions in grassveld and Nama Karoo biomes.
