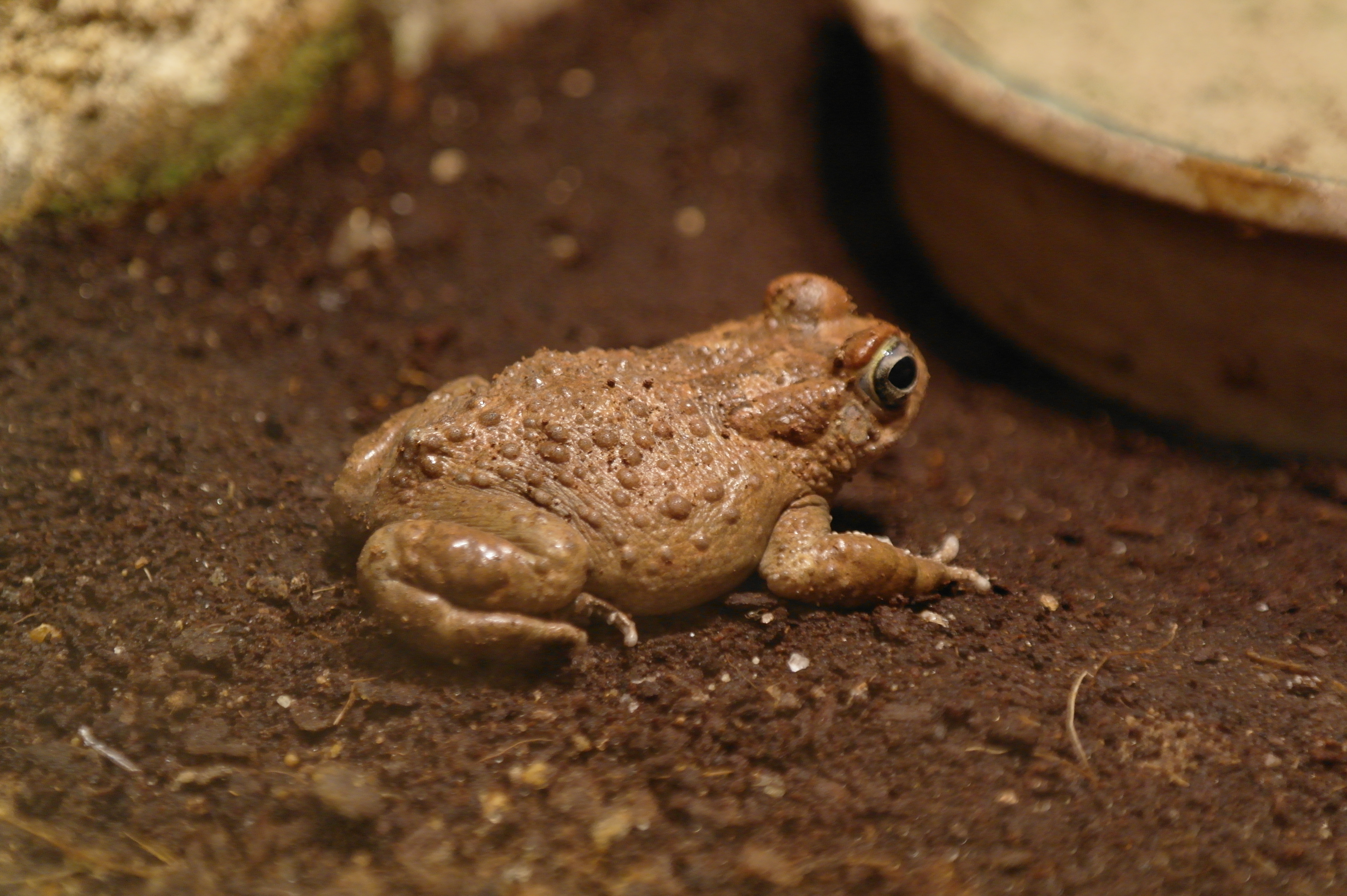

Conservation status
- Least Concern (IUCN 3.1)

Scientific classification
- Kingdom: Animalia
- Phylum: Chordata
- Class: Amphibia
- Order: Anura
- Family: Bufonidae
- Genus: Vandijkophrynus
- Species: V. gariepensis

Binomial name
- Vandijkophrynus gariepensis (Smith, 1848)

Synonyms
- Bufo gariepensis Smith, 1848; Bufo tuberculosus Bocage, 1896; Bufo granti Boulenger, 1903

= Karoo toad =

Species of amphibian

The Karoo toad, Gariep toad, or mountain toad (Vandijkophrynus gariepensis) is a species of toad in the family Bufonidae found in southern Namibia, much of South Africa, Lesotho, and Eswatini. It is an abundant species that occurs in many types habitat: fynbos heathland, succulent karoo, thickets, grassland, and Nama Karoo. Breeding takes place in permanent and temporary waterbodies (e.g., streams, waterholes, lakes, rain pools, even hoof prints). There are no significant threats to this adaptable species.
