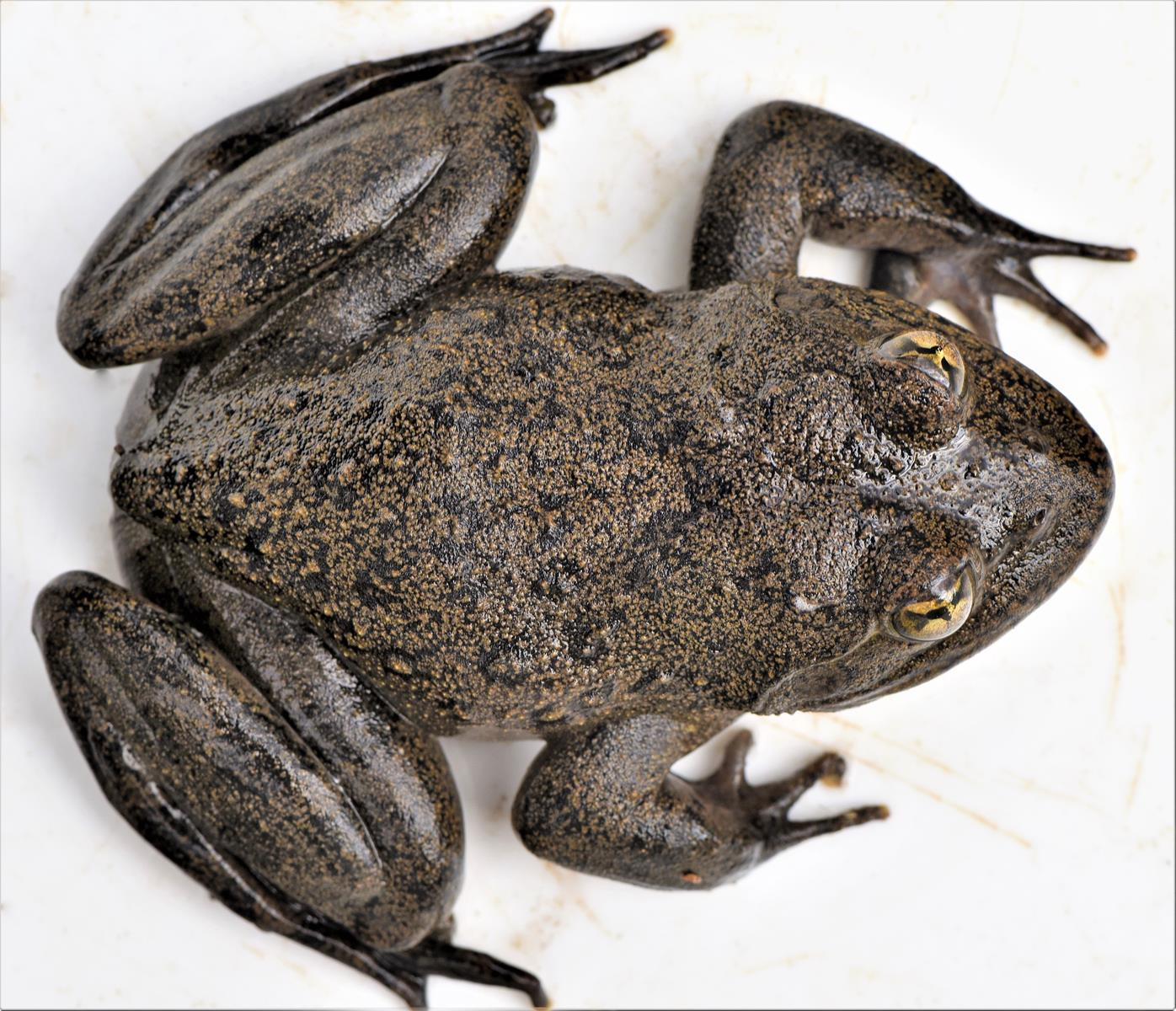

Conservation status
- Least Concern (IUCN 3.1)

Scientific classification
- Kingdom: Animalia
- Phylum: Chordata
- Class: Amphibia
- Order: Anura
- Family: Pyxicephalidae
- Genus: Amietia
- Species: A. vertebralis

Binomial name
- Amietia vertebralis (Hewitt, 1927)

Synonyms
- Rana vertebralis Hewitt, 1927; Rana umbraculata Bush, 1952

= Amietia vertebralis =

Species of amphibian

Amietia vertebralis, also known as Maluti river frog, aquatic river frog, ice frog, large-mouthed frog, or water frog, is a species of frogs in the family Pyxicephalidae. It is an aquatic high-altitude species found in Lesotho and neighbouring South Africa.

== Description ==
It is dark brown with a very warty skin and a somewhat squat appearance. It is a relatively large frog with a length from nose to vent of 150 millimetres (6 in) and 360 millimetres (14 in) from nose to toe; females are larger than males. The greatest width of its head is 57 millimetres (2 1/4 in). Its belly and insides of legs are white with a dark reticulation. The toes have extensive webbing.

The tadpoles are large and robust-bodied, with a Gosner stage 40 tadpole measuring 71 mm (2.8 in) in total length. The body, tail, and fins are darkly mottled.

== Habitat and ecology ==
Amietia vertebralis occurs in cold, clear mountain streams of montane grasslands at elevations of 1,600–3,400 m (5,200–11,200 ft) above sea level. It is a water-dependent and largely aquatic species that can stay underwater for long periods (up to 30 hours); during the winter months, it can be seen swimming under ice, although tadpoles can sometimes get trapped in ice. Breeding occurs during the warmer time of the year. Males calling submerged or with just the head protruding. Eggs are deposited in large clutches that become attached to sunken vegetation. Tadpoles and juveniles spend more time closer to the surface and in shallower pools than adults. Freshwater crabs form a large part of its diet.

== Conservation ==
It is a locally abundant species that is typically associated with pristine areas, although it can also occur in polluted sites. It can be locally be threatened by afforestation, dam building, and overgrazing (which causes siltation of rivers). Other potential threats include chytridiomycosis and introduced fish such as trout. Its use in local traditional medicine for treating burns is probably not occurring at a level that could constitute a threat to the species. It is present in a number of protected areas in both Lesotho and South Africa.
