= Stairs expedition to Katanga =

Belgian expedition to claim Katanga in 1891–2

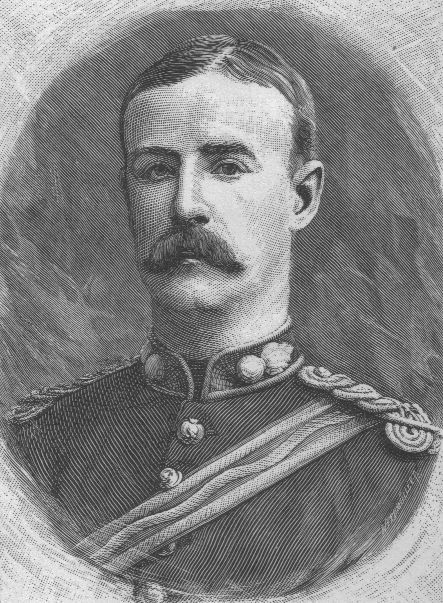
Captain William Stairs, leader of the expedition

The Stairs expedition to Katanga (1891−1892), led by Captain William Stairs, was the winner in a race between two imperial powers, the British South Africa Company BSAC and the Congo Free State, to claim Katanga, a vast mineral-rich territory in Central Africa, for the latter. The mission became notable when a local chief, (Mwenda Msiri), was killed, and also for the fact that Stairs, the leader of one side, actually held a commission in the army of the other.

This "scramble for Katanga" was a prime example of the Scramble for Africa, and one of the most dramatic incidents of that period.

== Historical background ==
On one side of the race was the Congo Free State, Belgian King Leopold II's instrument for private colonisation in Central Africa. On the other was the company chartered by the British government to make treaties with African chiefs, the BSAC of Cecil Rhodes, who mixed a determined approach to gaining mineral concessions with a vision for British imperial development spanning the continent.

Caught between them, and attempting to play one off against the other, was Msiri, the big chief of Garanganze or Katanga, a tribal land not yet claimed by a European power, and larger than many European countries in acreage. Msiri, like many African chiefs, had started as a slave trader, and had used superior weapons obtained by trading ivory, copper and slaves, to conquer and subjugate neighbouring tribes, taking many of them as slaves for resale. By the time of the Stairs expedition, Msiri was the unchallenged despot of the area. Like the newcomers, he had plenty of cunning and strategic sense, but this time he was the one with the inferior military technology (as well as being totally opposed to the British concept of abolitionism).

=== The Berlin Conference ===
At the 1884–1885 Berlin Conference and related bilateral negotiations between Britain and Belgium, the land west and north of the Luapula River−Lake Mweru system (Katanga) was allocated to the Congo Free State while the land to the east and south was allocated to Britain and the BSAC. However the agreements included a Principle of Effectivity under which each colonial power had to set up an effective presence in the territory—by obtaining treaties from local tribal chiefs, flying their flag, and setting up an administration and police force to keep order—to confirm the claim. If they did not, a rival could come in and do so, thereby 'legally' taking over the territory in the eyes of the civilized powers. In 1890 neither colonial power had treaties or an effective presence in Katanga, and as reports came of gold and copper being found in Katanga, the stage was set for a race between the BSAC and Free State.

Treaties obtained from local chiefs in Africa were not aimed at having them accept their subjugation − superior force did that (just as it had for the chiefs themselves, earlier) − but were solely to impress on rival colonial powers that they had the means to convince their own populations of the justice of any military action they might have to take to defend their claim to civilize the area, and that was all that mattered. The idea of democracy was spreading in Europe all throughout the nineteenth century, and, increasingly, governments were required to take account of public opinion. Public opinion in Europe could be a powerful motivator of colonial actions, as the Fashoda Incident a few years later demonstrated.

=== Previous expeditions ===
First off the mark was Rhodes who sent Alfred Sharpe from Nyasaland in 1890, backed up by Joseph Thomson coming from the south, but Sharpe failed to persuade Msiri, and Thomson didn't make it to Msiri's capital at Bunkeya. Sharpe's reports were complacently dismissive about the likelihood of their rivals having any success, and he said that once the 60-year-old Msiri was gone, Katanga would be theirs. In this case it would probably have become part of Northern Rhodesia, now Zambia, with which it shares strong cultural and ethnic links.

Leopold responded in 1891 by sending two expeditions, and Sharpe's view seemed to be borne out. The Paul Le Marinel expedition only managed to obtain a vaguely worded letter (the Le Marinel letter) from Msiri agreeing to Free State agents having a presence in Katanga, but nothing more. This expedition was hampered by an accident when the gunpowder it was bringing for Msiri blew up, killing several men and damaging some of the other gifts being brought to sweeten the deal. A Belgian officer from the expedition, Legat, stayed behind with a group of askaris at a boma on the Lufoi River about 40 km from Bunkeya to keep an eye on Msiri. (Msiri later accused Legat of actually having kept the supplies lost in the explosion for himself).

Le Marinel was followed by the Delcommune Expedition, which tried to persuade Msiri on the basis of the Le Marinel letter to accept the Free State flag and Leopold's sovereignty. It also failed, and moved off to the south to explore Katanga's mineral resources.

== Preparations and outward journey ==
=== Personnel ===
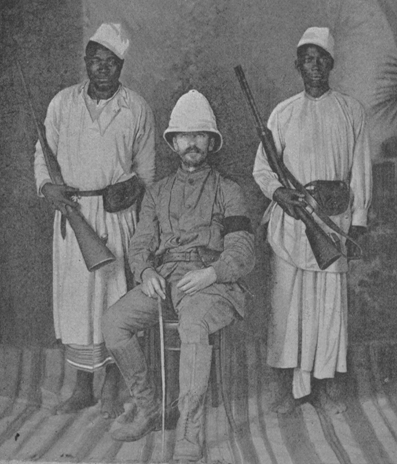
Dr. Joseph Moloney, medical officer to the Stairs Expedition, with two of the expedition's nyamparas (chiefs or supervisors), Hamadi bin Malum (left) and Massoudi, after their return to Zanzibar in July 1892. Moloney's black armband marks the death of the expedition leader, Captain William Stairs.

Belgium was short of people with tropical experience but Leopold was adept at recruiting other European nationalities for his schemes. Central Africa was a wild frontier attracting mercenaries for hire. At the recommendation of British-American explorer Henry Morton Stanley, who had already acted for Leopold in the Congo, the 27 year old Swahili speaking Captain William Stairs was appointed to lead the expedition, on the basis of his experience on the Emin Pasha Relief Expedition on which he had become Stanley's second in command. He had a reputation of someone who would obey orders and get the job done. That previous expedition had been marked by violence and brutality against any Africans who stood in its way as well as against its own African members. Canadian born at a time when it was part of the British Empire, Stairs had been educated partly in Britain and had joined a British regiment. He was considered to be and considered himself English or British.

Stairs' second-in-command was the only Belgian on the expedition, Captain Omer Bodson, who had already served the Free State in the Congo, and had had some contact with the Emin Pasha Relief expedition's controversial 'rear column'. Third in command was the Marquis Christian de Bonchamps, a French adventurer and hunter. There were two other whites: Joseph Moloney, the expedition doctor and also something of an adventurer, had previous African experience as a medical officer in the Boer War, and on an expedition in Morocco; and Robinson, the carpenter and fixer.

Unlike Sharpe, Stairs was not at all complacent about being in a race, and thought it likely that Joseph Thomson would be sent to negotiate with Msiri for the BSAC before they could get there.

The expedition hired 400 Africans, consisting of four or five Zanzibari 'chiefs' or supervisors including Hamadi bin Malum and Massoudi, about 100 askaris or African soldiers, a number of cooks and personal servants for the whites, and the rest, the majority, were porters or 'pagazis'. Most were from Zanzibar, some were from Mombasa, 40 were hired later in Tabora, Msiri's birthplace. At Bunkeya the expedition also had use of eight tough Dahomeyan askari stationed at Legat's boma on the Lufoi who knew Bunkeya well.

The expedition's askaris were armed with 200 'Fusil Gras' rifles (a standard French army weapon of the time) while the officers each had several weapons including Winchester repeating rifles. Msiri's army had muskets, and needed gunpowder.

=== Orders and objectives ===
Stairs' orders were to take Katanga with or without Msiri's agreement. If they found a BSAC expedition had beaten them and had a treaty with Msiri they should await further orders. If they obtained a treaty and a BSAC expedition arrived, they should ask it to withdraw and use force to make them comply if necessary. Moloney and Stairs were quite prepared for this eventuality. They were aware that in 1890, Cecil Rhodes had seized Manicaland in the face of Portuguese claims by sending an armed unit under Frederick Selous to occupy the territory and force the Portuguese to withdraw.

Having taken Katanga they should then await the arrival of a second Free State column, the Bia Expedition led by two Belgian officers, which was coming down from the Congo River in the north to meet them.

=== Route and journey ===
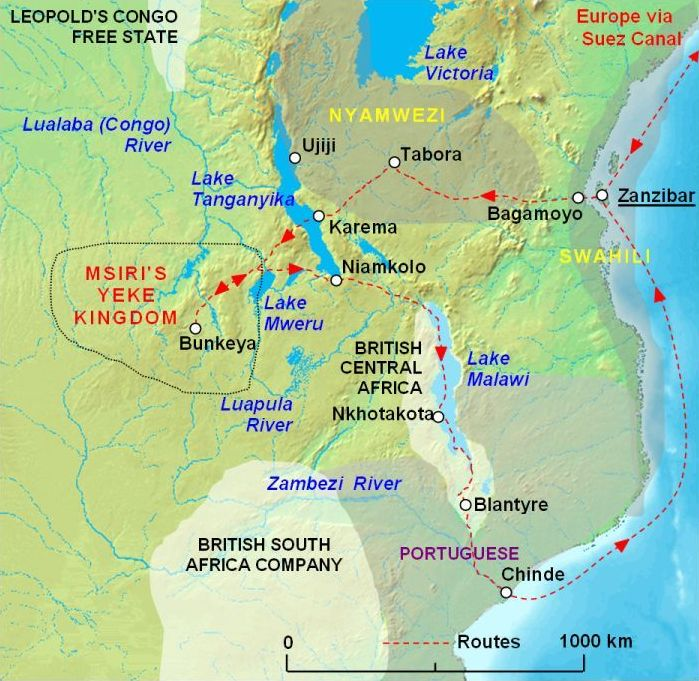
Map of Central and East Africa showing route of the Stairs expedition to Msiri's Yeke 'kingdom' in Katanga in 1891–2. Borders are approximate. Owing to a civil war, Msiri was not in control of all his kingdom's lands at the time of the expedition.

The island of Zanzibar was the expedition's base, as it was for most ventures into Central Africa. They left Zanzibar on June 27, 1891. The preferred route was via the Zambezi and Lake Nyasa (Lake Malawi) but Harry Johnston, British Commissioner in Nyasaland who had acted for Rhodes by sending Sharpe on his failed mission to Msiri, advised that military action he was taking against slave traders made that route unsafe. Instead they crossed German East Africa from Zanzibar, marching 1,050 km during the dry season to Lake Tanganyika through country with potentially hostile tribes and slave traders. They crossed the lake by boat, then marched 550 km to Bunkeya as extreme heat and humidity indicated the build-up to the rainy season which then brought chilling rain, mosquitoes and unsanitary conditions.

Averaging 13.3 km per day, it took them 120 days' marching spread over five months (with rest days and delays). The journey included extremes of thick forest, swamps and desolate stony plains. It also included beautiful landscapes, fertile woodland and game-rich grasslands. In one afternoon, Bodson shot a dozen antelope; on another occasion, the men feasted on hippopotamus until they could not move.

The officers had donkeys to ride on, but these died after crossing Lake Tanganyika. The expedition was not attacked by hostile tribes or raiders as were weaker caravans going to Lake Tanganyika that year.

As they approached Bunkeya, they found the land affected by famine and strife, with a number of burnt and deserted villages. Moloney attributed this to Msiri's tyranny, other accounts suggested that some of the Wasanga chiefs Msiri had forcibly subjugated were taking advantage of the arrival of European powers in the land to rebel against his 30-year rule and, at the age of 60, Msiri was perceived as near the end of his time.

Some accounts say that the Delcommune expedition, still in the south of Katanga but out of contact with Stairs, was fomenting revolt among Msiri's subject tribes. Bonchamps noted that as Msiri's main army of 5000 warriors had gone south led by one 'Loukoukou' to put down a rebellion by a subject tribe, he was less belligerent, at least on the surface.

On being told by some local people that there were three Europeans in Bunkeya, for a time the expedition thought that Thomson had beaten them. They sent one of their chiefs ahead to ask Msiri for an audience, and he returned with a letter from one of the Europeans, Dan Crawford — they were Plymouth Brethren missionaries. Near Bunkeya they were met by Legat, the officer from the Le Marinel expedition with his elite Dahomeyan askari. There was no news of the Bia Expedition.

== Msiri ==
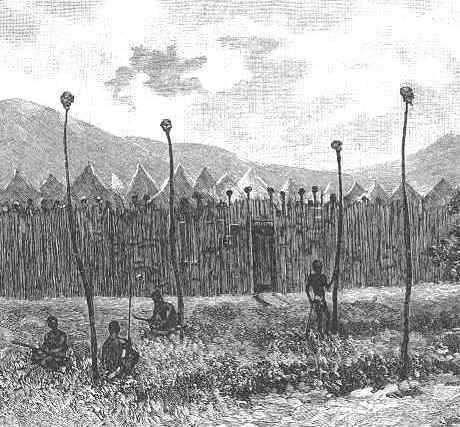
The front of Msiri's boma (compound) at Bunkeya. The objects on top of the four poles, below which some of Msiri's warriors are gathered, are heads of his enemies. More skulls are on the palisades forming the stockade.

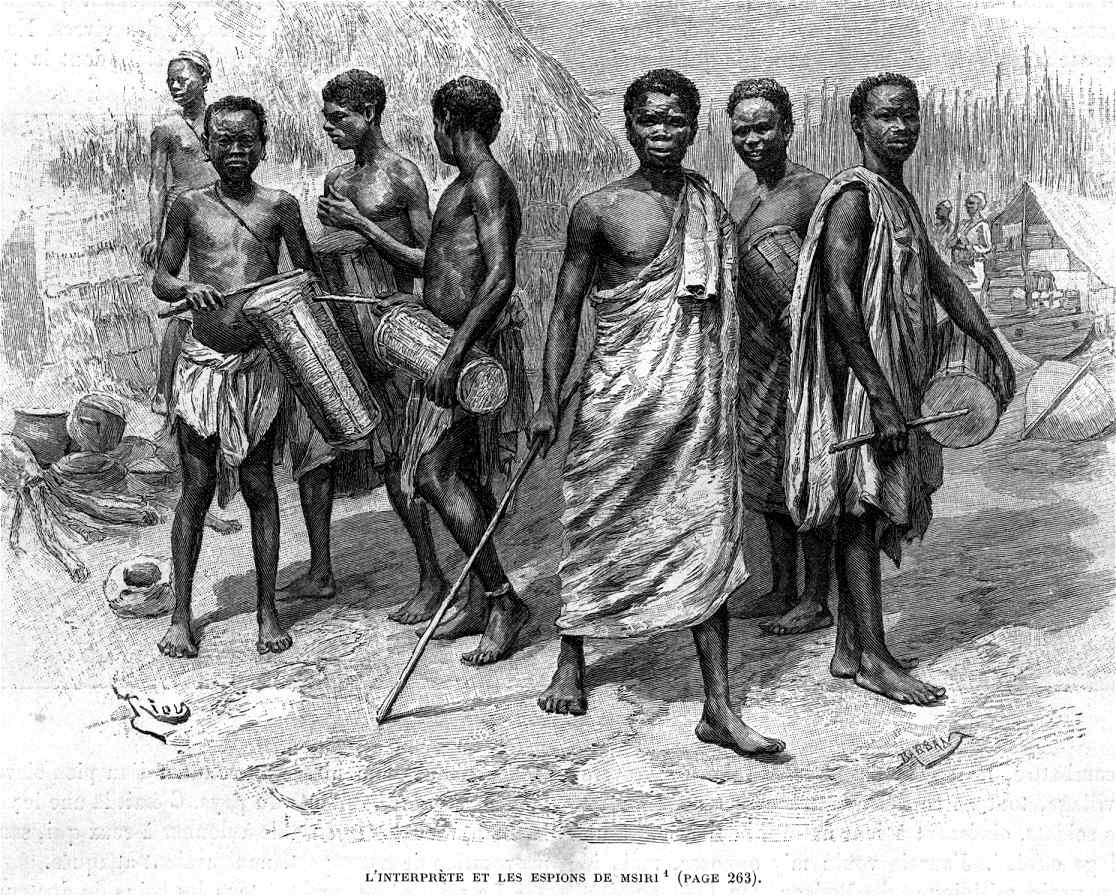
Msiri's spies; this group led by an interpreter arrived in the expedition's fortified camp with a message. The drummers kept playing, and the expedition only found out later these were talking drums sending back information about the camp's defences.

Msiri's capital at Bunkeya consisted of a very large boma surrounded by numerous villages spread over an area several kilometres across. The expedition was directed to set up camp within a few hundred metres of the boma. Heads and skulls of Msiri's enemies and victims were mounted on the palisades and on poles at the front. Moloney and Bonchamps referred to these as examples of Msiri's barbarity, and later found it necessary to treat Msiri's own head in the same way, in order to impress his former slaves and warriors.

After the traditional three-day wait before one can see an African big chief, Msiri received them courteously on 17 December 1891. Gifts were presented and negotiations started. Both sides feigned the possibility of future compliance with the other's demands. Msiri wanted gunpowder and removal of Legat, Stairs wanted to fly the Free State flag over Bunkeya. Stairs seemed to think that the Le Marinel letter indicated Msiri's acquiescence, but it was vague, and Msiri repudiated any such interpretation.

During a stand-off in the negotiations, Msiri used a technique to spy on Stairs' camp which the latter only discovered later, shown in the illustration, Msiri's spies.

Of Msiri's physical presence, Joseph Moloney wrote: "In his prime, Msiri, must have looked the ideal of a warrior-king; he was by no means contemptible in his decline… there was a sphinx-like impenetrability about his expression… his demeanour was thoroughly regal".

On December 19, Stairs realised that Msiri's intention was to delay as long as possible and play the Free State and BSAC off against each other. Concern was growing that Thomson might appear at any time, or that the 5000 warriors would return from the south, so Bonchamps proposed capturing Msiri when he went out at night relatively unguarded to see his favourite wife, Maria de Fonseca, and holding him hostage. Stairs rejected the idea partly because the three British missionaries were not under the expedition's protection at that time, and Stairs felt they were in effect hostages who would be killed in retaliation. He decided instead on an ultimatum: he told Msiri to sign a treaty and hold a ceremony of blood brotherhood with him the next day, and that he would fly the Free State flag without his consent, which he proceeded to do.

Msiri's response was to leave in the night for Munema, a fortified village outside Bunkeya. The next day, December 20, finding him gone, Stairs sent Bodson and Bonchamps with 100 askari to bring Msiri back to him under arrest.

== The killing of Msiri ==
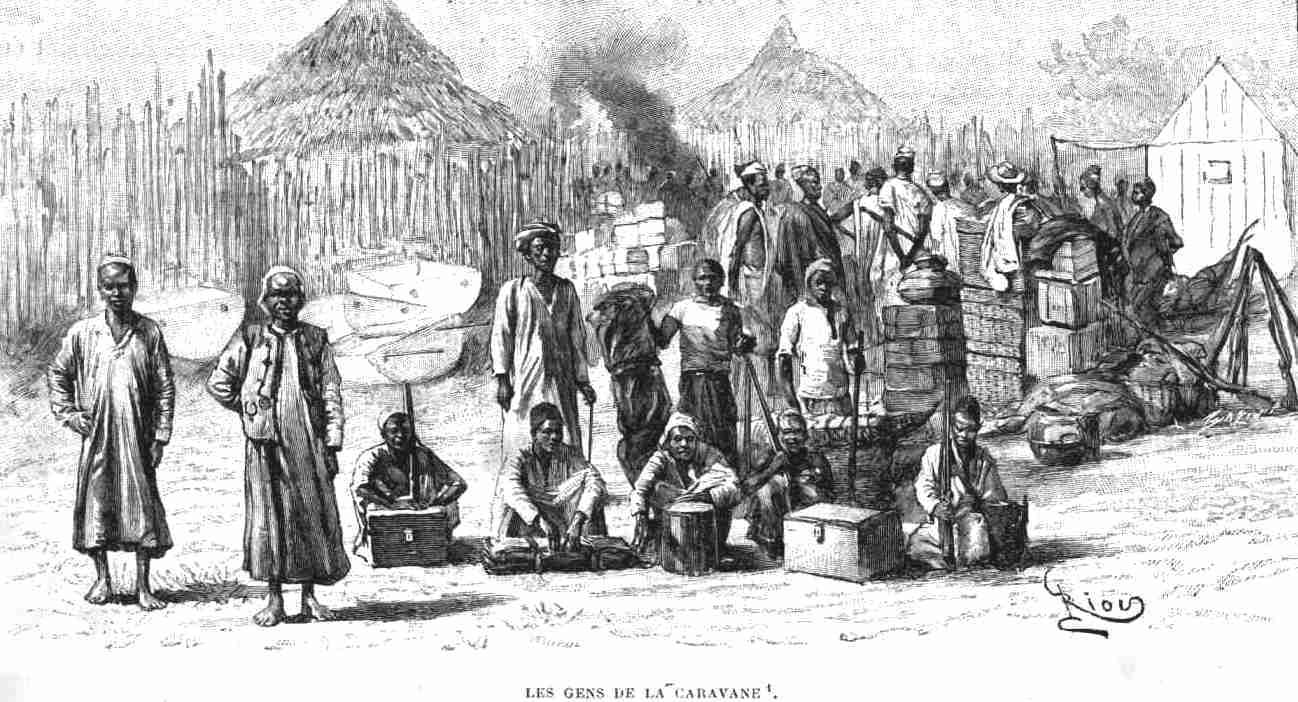
African members of the Stairs expedition. The men with rifles are most likely to be askaris, the others are porters, the man in the jacket is probably a nyampara (supervisor or chief). In the background at left are sections of two small boats which they carried for crossing rivers. Next to them, middle background are bales of cloth used for bartering for food and permission to cross chiefs' territories.

At Munema Bodson and Bonchamps found a large guarded stockade surrounding a hundred huts and a maze of narrow alleys, with Msiri somewhere inside. Despite Bonchamps' protests about the danger, Bodson decided to go inside with just ten askari including a Dahomeyan and Hamadi-bin-Malum to find Msiri, while Bonchamps and the remaining askari waited outside. Bodson would fire his revolver if he needed assistance.

Bodson found Msiri sitting in front of a large hut with 300 men in the background, many armed with muskets. Bodson told Msiri he had come to take him to Stairs, and Msiri did not reply but became angry, rose and put his hand on his sword (a gift brought by Stairs). Bodson drew his revolver and shot Msiri three times, and one of Msiri's men — his son Masuka — fired his musket hitting Bodson in the abdomen and spinal column. The Dahomeyan askari shot and killed Masuka, and in the general firing Hamadi was hit in the ankle.

Bonchamps and the remaining askari ran to the sound, and chaos took over. Most of Msiri's men fled, the askaris shot at anything, and then started looting. It took nearly an hour for Moloney to arrive with reinforcements. He and Bonchamps restored order among the askaris and, under sporadic fire from Msiri's men under the command of his adopted son Mukanda-Bantu and brothers, Chukako and Lukuku, retreated with Bodson and the other wounded, and Msiri's body, to prevent his men pretending to the populace that he was still alive. They took up a defensive position on a hill near their camp where Stairs had been waiting.

This account of the killing was attributed by Moloney to a verbal report by Hamadi, while Bonchamps wrote that the injured Bodson gave him the same account before he died in the night. Stairs wrote a letter to Arnot with the same details of the attempted arrest at Munema, but also said that Msiri's men had 'cocked their guns' when Bodson confronted Msiri.

On the hill to which they retreated, according to Bonchamps but not mentioned by Moloney, the expedition cut off Msiri's head and hoisted it on a palisade in plain view, to show the people their king was dead. Bonchamps, who had written about the disgust of seeing how Msiri had put heads of his enemies on poles outside his boma, admitted this was barbaric, but claimed it was a necessary lesson aimed at those who had attacked the expedition 'without provocation'.

Munema was littered with bodies and the expedition's askaris carried out a general massacre. Dan Crawford wrote: "The population completely dispersed. No one dared walk openly abroad. The paths became lined with corpses, some of whom had died of starvation and some of the universal mistrust which keeps spears on the quiver".

== Aftermath ==
The expedition quickly strengthened their defences but were not attacked in retaliation. Msiri's brothers and Mukanda-Bantu sent messages the next day asking for the body to bury, and Stairs agreed to release it. Msiri's head is not mentioned again by Bonchamps, Garanganze sources say they buried a body without a head. After the burial, negotiations re-opened and included Maria de Fonseca (later executed by Mukanda-Bantu in horrible fashion for 'betrayal') and her brother, Msiri's Portuguese-Angolan trading partner, Coimbra.

The expedition's weaponry and askaris had proved their superiority over muskets and Msiri's people were more interested in the succession than revenge. Stairs backed Mukanda-Bantu to succeed Msiri, but as chief of a reduced territory, and he restored the Wasanga chiefs overthrown by Msiri 30 years before. Mukanda-Bantu signed the treaties, and the restored Wasanga chiefs were very happy to do so too. Msiri's brothers were unhappy with the sub-chieftainships they were given and refused to sign up, until threatened with the same fate as Msiri. By early January 1892 the expedition had the papers sufficient to convince their British rivals that they now had Katanga.

During that January though, the food ran out and none was left in the district — already affected by famine, the population took what little there was with them when they fled. The rainy season brought malaria and dysentery, all four surviving officers fell sick, and floods cut Bunkeya off from the game-rich plains to the north where they might have hunted. Moloney recovered first and took charge of the expedition's task of building a more permanent fort and trying to find food. 76 of the expedition's askaris and porters died that month of dysentery and starvation. Stairs had severe fevers, and in his delirium he imagined Thomson had arrived, and yelled for his revolver with which to repel the BSAC man; Moloney had wisely taken it from him.

At the end of the January the new season's crop of maize was ready for harvest, and this saved the expedition. Then the delayed Bia Expedition of about 350 men arrived from the Free State in the north.

== Return journey ==
As Captain Stairs, the Marquis Bonchamps and Robinson were still incapacitated, it was agreed that Captain Bia would take over the consolidation of Congo Free State control of Katanga, and the Stairs expedition would return by the originally-planned route via Lake Nyasa and the Zambezi.

As they left carrying the sick officers in hammocks they experienced some harassment and raids by natives ruled by Lukuku, and the march was exceptionally hard owing to the heavy rains at the end of the wet season (as well as to the continuing illness and weakness of expedition members). Bonchamps had recovered by the time they reached Lake Tanganyika and was put in charge by Stairs, who had not fully recovered. This caused some friction between Bonchamps and Moloney, and there are some contradictions between their accounts.

From the north end of Lake Nyasa onwards the route was by steamer, except for a march of about 150 km around the rapids on the Shire River. Here the route took them past Zomba and Blantyre, headquarters of the British Commissioner for Central Africa, none other than Alfred Sharpe, the BSAC agent whom they had beaten in the race. They met but the conversation has not been recorded.

On a second steamer down the Zambezi, Stairs, who seemed to have recovered, suddenly took sick again and died on 3 June 1892, of haematuric fever, a severe form of malaria, before they reached Chinde, a river transport base, where he was buried in the European cemetery.

The expedition reached Zanzibar a year after their departure. Of 400 Africans on the expedition to leave Tabora, only 189 reached Zanzibar, most of the other 211 had died, a few had absconded. Bonchamps, Moloney and Robinson reached Europe barely two weeks after sailing from Zanzibar, and just over 14 months after having left Paris and London on the expedition.

== Consequences ==
On his return to London, Moloney learned that Thomson had not tried to reach Katanga again. The British Government had quietly ordered him not to go.

The expedition had only survived through the strength and endurance of the Zanzibari porters and askaris, as well as the tendency of a loyal core of them, epitomised by Hamadi bin Malum, to come to the rescue when mutiny, treachery, robbery or some other disaster threatened.

=== Leopold and the Belgian Congo ===
The expedition was regarded by the Belgians as a complete success. Leopold used his influence and that of the British directors he had appointed to his companies to gain acceptance of the treaties signed to place Katanga securely in Leopold's realm, adding about half a million square kilometres to it (16 times the area of Belgium). Keeping it separate from the rest of the Free State, Leopold delegated the administration of Katanga to another of his companies, which set up on the northern and western shores of Lake Mweru. This meant it was not associated with the Red Rubber problems of Free State rule in the rest of the Congo. The Katanga company's main achievement was helping to stamp out the slave trade, but it did little in the rest of the territory until after 1900. Katanga remained affected by instability and conflict, as various chieftainships struggled to fill the vacuum left by Msiri's death.

Katanga and the Congo were both taken over by the Belgian government in 1908 in response to the international outcry over the brutality of Leopold's Congo Free State, and were merged in 1910 as the Belgian Congo, but the legacy of the previous separation was a tendency of Katanga to secede.

The Belgian Congo administration with its policy of direct rule did nothing to prepare the country for independence in 1960 and within a few years Congo and Katanga became such bywords for strife and chaos that the Mobutu regime, in a futile effort to improve its image, changed the names to Zaire and Shaba respectively (since reverted).

=== Rhodes and the BSAC ===
Cecil Rhodes got over any disappointment at losing the scramble for Katanga by doing what he did best − he invested in mineral prospecting and mining in Katanga. When the British in the Rhodesian territories realised in the 1920s the extent of Katanga's mineral wealth, which was more than the equal of Northern Rhodesia's own Copperbelt, the most polite epithet for Captain Stairs was 'mercenary', and some regarded him as a traitor to the British Empire.

=== The Garanganze people ===
The population in and around Bunkeya numbered 60−80 000 but most dispersed in the disorder. The Belgians forcibly moved Mukanda-Bantu and about 10,000 of his people to the Lufoi River where they continued the chieftainship under the title 'Mwami Mwenda' in honour of Msiri. They eventually returned to Bunkeya where today Mwami Mwenda VIII is the reigning chief of about 20,000 Yeke/Garanganze people.

Dan Crawford moved to the Luapula-Lake Mweru valley and set up two missions to which many Garanganze people gravitated.

==== The DR Congo-Zambia border ====
The Stairs Expedition confirmed that the border between Belgian and British colonies would lie along the Zambezi-Congo watershed, the Luapula River, Lake Mweru and an arbitrary line drawn between Mweru and Lake Tanganyika. This divided culturally and ethnically similar people such as the Kazembe-Lunda and created the Congo Pedicle, an example of the arbitrary nature of colonial borders.

== Msiri's head: a curse and a mystery ==
In the traditional belief systems of the Garanganze people, as with other Central and Southern African cultures, illness and disease are not caused by pathogens but by magic and supernatural forces. The sickness suffered by Stairs and the expedition members was attributed by them to Msiri's spirit and his people taking revenge, and a rumour took hold that Stairs had kept Msiri's head and it cursed and killed all who carried it. The Mwami Mwenda chieftainships' history says that the expedition fled with Msiri's head intending to present it to Leopold, but 'Mukanda-Bantu and his men' caught and 'killed all the Belgians' and the head was buried 'under a hill of stones' in what is now Zambia.

Another account says that when Stairs died he had with him Msiri's head in a can of kerosene, but there is no mention of it in Moloney's or Bonchamps' journals. The whereabouts of Msiri's skull remains a mystery today.

== See also ==
- History of Katanga
