= Frederick Stanley Arnot =

British missionary to Central Africa (1858-1914)

- Born: 12 September 1858; Glasgow, Scotland
- Died: 14 May 1914 (aged 55); Johannesburg, South Africa
- Occupation: Missionary
- Known for: Explorations

Frederick Stanley Arnot (12 September 1858 – 14 May 1914) was a British missionary who did much to establish Christian missions in what are now Angola, Zambia and the Democratic Republic of the Congo (DRC).

== Early years ==
Arnot was born in Glasgow on 12 September 1858. His family lived in the town of Hamilton, southeast of Glasgow, for several years. There he became close to his neighbours, the family of the medical missionary David Livingstone. He looked up to Livingstone as a hero and determined to emulate him. He felt practical skills would be needed in his future missionary career. At fourteen he left school to become an apprentice joiner in the Glasgow shipyards. Arnot was brought up in the Church of Scotland, but became a member of the Plymouth Brethren.

== First expedition ==
In July 1881, aged 22, Arnot embarked for Cape Town. He was not associated with a missionary board, although in his work he was always glad to cooperate with those who were. He aimed to find a region in the hinterland that would be healthy for Europeans. They could train the local Africans in the Christian faith, and these Africans could in turn act as missionaries in the less healthy regions.

Arnot travelled by coastal steamer to Durban. In August 1881, he left for the interior, traveling slowly through the Transvaal to Shoshong in Botswana where he was welcomed by King Kama, who had been converted to Christianity. Arnot arrived in Shoshong on 11 March 1882. There he met the missionary J.D. Hepburn and observed him at work. He called Hepburn "a faithful man, who sought the conversion not only of the natives of the tribe but also of every man who passed through Shoshong white or black".

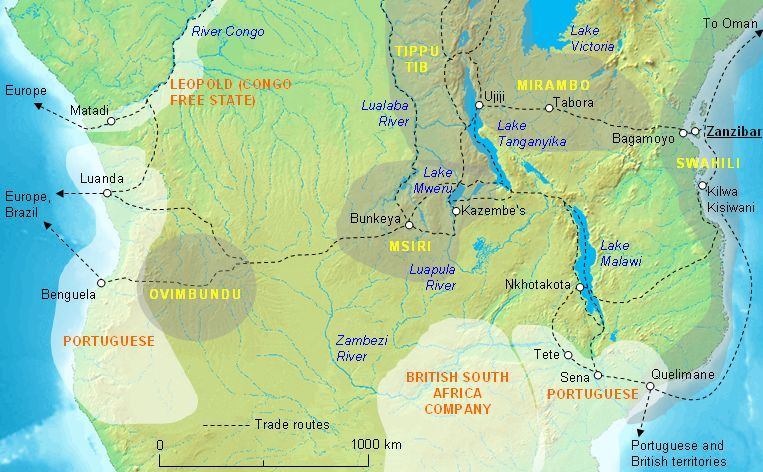
Southern Central Africa around 1880, showing the main interior trade routes. Msiri's kingdom is in the center of the map.

After a three-month stay Arnot continued northward across the Kalahari Desert to the Barotse kingdom, in what is now western Zambia. In December 1882 he reached Lealui, the capital. Arnot was present when the Lozi King Lewanika received a proposal from the Ndebele for an alliance to resist the white men. Arnot may have helped Lewanika to see the advantages of a British protectorate in terms of the greater wealth and security it would provide. Lewanika kept him here for the next eighteen months. While in the Barotse kingdom, Arnot met the British colonial official Ralph Champneys Williams, who said of the missionary that 'He was the simplest and most earnest of men. He lived a life of great hardship under the care of Wanawenna, then king of the Barotse, and taught his children... he was imbued with one desire, and that was to do God service. Whether it could best be done in that way I will not here question, but he looked neither to the right nor left, caring nothing for himself if he could but get one to believe; at least so he struck me, and I have honoured the recollection of him ever since as being as near his Master as anyone I ever saw.'

Arnot left Bulozi in 1884 to seek medical attention and to escape a brewing rebellion against Lewanika. He was assisted in reaching the Bié Plateau in Angola by the Portuguese trader and army officer António da Silva Porto. Despite his illness, he refused to be carried in a hammock by African porters, insisting on riding an ox. He had to travel westward rather than to the east as he had planned. His route took him over the high country along the watershed of the Zambezi and the Congo rivers. At 5,000 feet (1,500 m) the location was cool and relatively free of malaria-carrying mosquitoes. (Note: In 1905 the medical missionary Walter Fisher, who had accompanied Arnot on a later visit to Africa in 1889, established a hospital at Kalene Hill.) The journey was arduous, through rough country and with constant exposure to accidents and unfamiliar diseases. Arnot eventually reached Benguela on the Atlantic coast in Portuguese territory around the end of 1884. It had taken him four years to cross the continent from east to west.

== Msiri ==
Arnot recovered his health while staying at Bailundu, inland from the coast in Ovimbundu territory, as the guest of some missionaries from the American Board of Commissioners for Foreign Missions. Messengers arrived there from the chief Msidi (Msiri), who ruled a large area in what is now Katanga Province in the Democratic Republic of the Congo, with its capital at Bunkeya. Msiri invited the white men to visit his Garenganze kingdom. On 3 June 1885 Arnot set out with a caravan of forty bearers and supplies for two years, reaching Bunkeya on 14 February 1886. When Arnot arrived he had no food left, no trade goods and no white companions. He received a warm welcome, however, although Msiri discouraged his missionary work for fear it would make his subjects disloyal.

Msiri's father had been in the business of buying copper ore in Katanga and transporting it to the east coast of Africa for resale. As a young man Msiri remained behind in the region as his father's agent. He became leader of a group of Bayeke people, and established a state that extended from the Luapula River south to the Congo-Zambezi watershed, and from Lake Mweru in the east to the Lualaba River in the west. Based on Bunkeya, the state controlled a huge central-African trading network, mostly dealing in slaves but also in ivory, salt, copper and iron ore. Traders came to Bunkeya from the Zambezi and Congo basins, from Angola, Uganda and Zanzibar. The Arabs from the east coast bought guns and ammunition, which Msiri used to maintain his position.

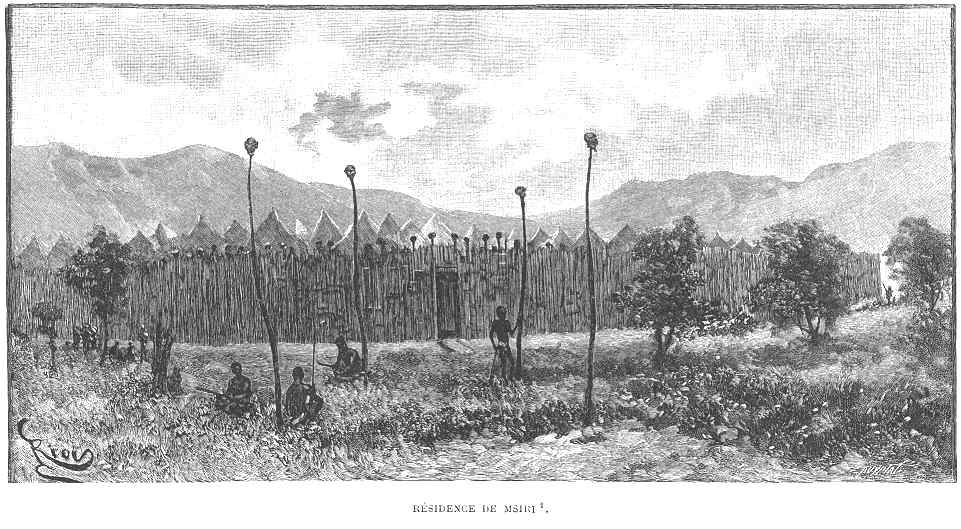
Msiri's boma (compound) at Bunkeya. The objects on top of the four poles, below which some of Msiri's warriors are gathered, are heads of his enemies. More skulls are on the stakes forming the stockade.

An unsympathetic report written in 1890 said: "There is the Garangange kingdom of M'sidi, where Mr. F.S. Arnot, 'the young Livingstone,' and his friends are trying to found a mission. This country is picturesque and salubrious, consisting of highlands to the west of Lake Bangweolo. M'sidi is, though a perfect savage, one of the most powerful monarchs of that part of Africa. He is a cruel despot, who governs by means of 2,000 fusileers, whom he has trained and armed, and whom he employs on marauding expeditions. His own palace is surrounded by human skulls ... The celebrated Katanga copper mines are in his dominions..."

Msiri's rule was harsh but Arnot managed to establish a relationship of mutual respect. He said: "Msidi is a thorough gentleman. The other day he told one of his courtiers that he had one true friend and that was 'Monare,' for in his heart he did not find one single suspicion of me and I feel much the same toward Msidi. I have no suspicion of his friendship; he most carefully avoids asking anything of me". Arnot was allowed to build a mission with a church, school, clinic and orphanage and began to teach the children to read and write. He was the only European in Garanganze from January 1886 until December 1887. He was then joined by Charles Swan and William Henry Faulknor, two other missionaries. Arnot left the mission in their hands in February 1888 and reached Britain on 18 September 1888 after an absence of over seven years.

== Later career ==
Arnot had become well-known from reports of his travels and work. In London he was invited to read a paper on the source of the Zambezi to the Royal Geographical Society, and he was made a fellow of this society. Arnot continued to organise missionaries, both male and female, over the next decade, establishing a string of missions from the Atlantic coast in Angola to Garenganze. Maintaining these posts involved delicate arrangements with the Belgian and Portuguese colonial authorities and with the local African traders and chiefs. Arnot's missionaries had high mortality. He wrote later that the route to the interior was marked by a chain of graves. It is probable that he felt these graves established a form of moral claim on the territory.

Early in 1889 Arnot returned to Africa accompanied by thirteen recruits. These included his wife Harriet Jane Fisher, whom he had married in March of that year. It also included Walter Fisher who later would found the Kalene Mission Hospital. Despite invitations from Msiri, Arnot's poor health meant he could not risk the grueling journey to Bunkeya. Instead, he and his wife remained in what is now eastern Angola. (Note: In December 1891 a Belgian expedition under William Grant Stairs arrived at Bunkeya. Stairs demanded that Msiri accept the sovereignty of King Leopold II of Belgium over his territory. Msiri refused and fled to a nearby village where he was killed by Omer Bodson, a member of Stairs' force. Resistance ceased and Katanga with its copper mines was annexed to the Congo Free State.) In 1892 Arnot went back to England, living for the next two years in the port of Liverpool where he oversaw the shipment of goods to the missions in Africa. He returned to Katanga in 1894, this time travelling from the east coast. His route took him up the lower Zambezi River, north through Lake Malawi and then west via lakes Tanganyika and Mweru. Recurring health problems forced Arnot to return from Katanga after only a few weeks. However, in later years he made further expeditions into what are now Angola, Zambia and the Democratic Republic of the Congo. Many of the missions he established then are still active.

Arnot became seriously ill on a trip in 1914 to what is now northwest Zambia, and was carried back to Johannesburg. He died there on 14 May 1914. In his time, Arnot was known as "the knight of Africa". Arnot's son Nigel and daughter Winifred also became missionaries, working at the Kalunda mission in Angola.

== Bibliography ==
- Frederick Stanley Arnot (1884). From Natal to the upper Zambesi with continuation entitled First year among the Barotsi (3 ed.). James E. Hawkins.
- Arnot, Frederick Stanley (1889). Garenganze: or, Seven years' pioneer mission work in central Africa. J.E. Hawkins.
- Frederick Stanley Arnot (1893). Bihé and Garenganze: or four years' further work and travel in Central Africa. J.E. Hawkins.
- Frederick Stanley Arnot (1902). Garenganze, West and East: a review of twenty-one years' pioneer work in the heart of Africa. A. Holness.
- David Livingstone, Frederick Stanley Arnot (1912). Missionary travels and researches in South Africa. J. Murray.
- Frederick Stanley Arnot (1914). Missionary travels in central Africa. Office of Echoes of Service.
