= Yeke =

Yeke may refer to:

- Yeke Kingdom (1856–1891), in Katanga, DR Congo
- Yeke people, or Garanganze people, in Katanga, DR Congo
- Yeke Juu League, current Ordos City, in Inner Mongolia, China
- Yé ké yé ké, famous African song by Mory Kanté
- "Yeke Yeke", a song by Werrason featuring Bikorine & But Na Fillet, 2020
- Yekke, a Jew of German-speaking origin.
