= Maria de Fonseca =

Wife of Misri, King of the Yeke

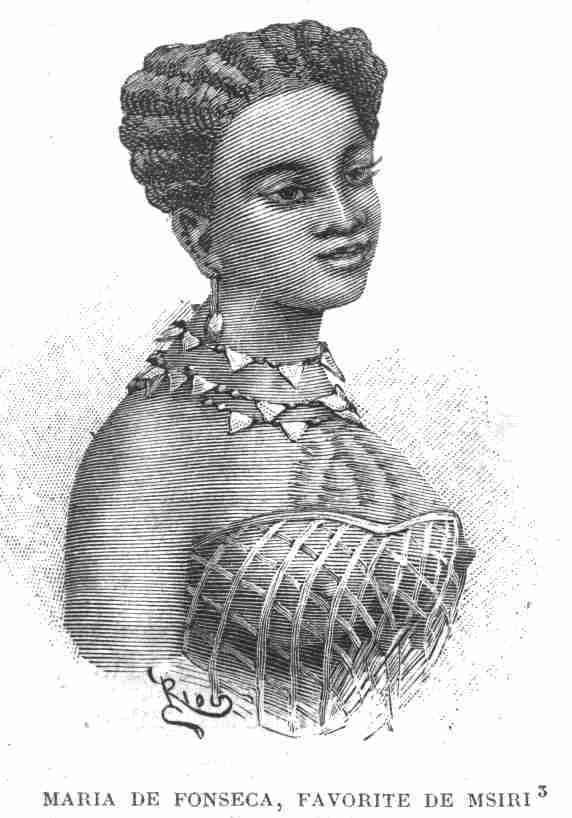
Msiri's favourite wife, Maria de Fonseca, daughter of a Portuguese-Angolan trader.

Maria de Fonseca was the great wife of Msiri, the powerful warrior-king of Katanga, at the time when the Stairs Expedition arrived in 1891 to take possession of the territory for the Belgian King Leopold II, with or without Msiri's consent.

Msiri typically cemented alliances with trading partners by marriage. Maria was the daughter of mixed Portuguese-African parents from Angola, and was also the sister of Coimbra, the first trader to supply him with gunpowder from the west coast, the key to Msiri's power.

In 1891, Maria was about forty-five years old and Msiri, about sixty, and had been ruler of Katanga for thirty years. When treaty negotiations with Msiri reached stalemate, Christian de Bonchamps, third officer of the expedition, proposed capturing Msiri and holding him hostage. Msiri typically had 300 armed warriors at his stockade, but de Bonchamps had discovered that every night, he would leave with just a handful of guards to visit Maria at her compound nearly a kilometre away.

Captain Stairs rejected the idea of the ambush in favour of an ultimatum, and this led to a confrontation in which Captain Omer Bodson shot Msiri dead, and was himself fatally shot. Maria and Coimbra appear to have come to terms with this development, and took part in talks with Stairs on the acceptance by Msiri's successor of Leopold's sovereignty over Katanga. Coimbra returned to Angola but Maria remained in Katanga as she enjoyed her position at the king's court.

According to the oral history of the Mwami Mwenda chieftainship which succeeded Msiri, Maria had "betrayed Msiri to the Belgians" and so his adopted son and successor Mukanda-Bantu beheaded Maria with a machete while standing behind her and shouting to the crowd: "I am Mukanda-Bantu, the one who walks over his foes".

== See also ==
- Msiri
- Stairs Expedition
- Christian de Bonchamps
