= Joseph Thomson (explorer) =

British geologist and explorer

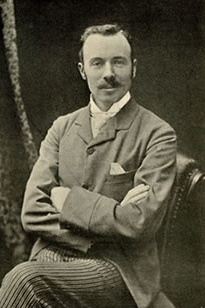
- Born: 14 February 1858; Penpont, Dumfriesshire, Scotland
- Died: 2 August 1895 (aged 37); London, England
- Occupations: Geologist and explorer

Joseph Thomson (14 February 1858 – 2 August 1895) was a British geologist and explorer who played an important part in the Scramble for Africa. Thomson's gazelle and Thomson's Falls, Nyahururu, are named after him. Excelling as an explorer rather than an exact scientist, he avoided confrontations among his porters or with indigenous peoples, neither killing any native nor losing any of his men to violence. His motto is often quoted to be "He who goes gently, goes safely; he who goes safely, goes far."

== Early life ==
Born in Penpont, Dumfriesshire, he was apprenticed into his father's stone-masonry and quarrying business. He developed a keen amateur interest in geology and botany, which eventually led to his formal education at the University of Edinburgh, studying under Archibald Geikie and Thomas Henry Huxley.

== Royal Geographical Society ==
On graduating in 1878, he was appointed geologist and naturalist to Alexander Keith Johnston's Royal Geographical Society expedition to establish a route from Dar es Salaam to Lake Nyasa and Lake Tanganyika. Johnston died from malaria and dysentery during the trip and Thomson was left to take the leadership role for the expedition. Thomson successfully led the expedition over 5,000 kilometres (3,000 mi) in 14 months, collecting many specimens and recording many observations. Part of his crew included James Chuma, who also worked closely with and assisted the Scottish explorer David Livingstone.

In 1883, he embarked on another Royal Geographical Society expedition, this time to explore a route from the eastern coast of Africa to the northern shores of Lake Victoria. British Empire traders wanted a route that would avoid potentially hostile Maasai and German traders who were competing in the area. The expedition set out a few months behind the rival German expedition of Gustav A. Fischer. Thomson's leadership was again a success, demonstrating the feasibility of the route and establishing a possible terminal and depot at the northern shores of Lake Victoria while making many important biological, geological, and ethnographic observations, though Thomson's attempt to climb Mount Kilimanjaro in a day failed. However, on the return journey, Thomson was gored by a buffalo and subsequently suffered from malaria and dysentery. He is credited with confirming Krapf's 1849 report of snow on Mount Kenya. He was prevented from making an attempt on the mountain by hostile Maasai. Nevertheless, he is commemorated on that mountain by Point Thomson (4,955 m) and Thomson's Flake.

He recovered in time to give an account of his experiences at a meeting in November 1884 of the Royal Geographical Society, which awarded him their Founder's Medal the following year. His book Through Masai Land followed in January 1885 and was a best seller. One of the first to read it was the young Henry Rider Haggard. His imagination fired by Thomson's expedition, Haggard promptly wrote a book of his own, King Solomon's Mines. Haggard also wrote other well received novels e.g. She, one of a series succeeding King Solomon's Mines. The novel expands on further adventures of the main characters in King Solomon's Mines. When Thomson read She, he felt it did not represent the lands it was based on, and wrote a novel based on his experiences in the East African region, for example described in his book Through Masai Land. He called this novel Ulu: an African Romance. It was successful enough to demand a sequel which he wrote with Miss E. Harrison Smith as Ulu: an African Romance volume II.

== Hiatus ==
In 1885, Thomson was employed by the National African Company to forestall and hinder German influence in the vicinity of the Niger River, but he returned the following year to the UK to lecture, disillusioned that no further opportunities existed for large-scale exploration in the continent. He became discontented with his life in the UK and struggled to identify new opportunities for exploration. A modest expedition to the Atlas Mountains of Morocco was marred by trouble with porters and local political difficulties. He spent a month in 1889 travelling in central Europe with budding author J. M. Barrie.

== British South Africa Company ==
In 1890, Cecil Rhodes employed Thomson to explore north of the Zambezi, conclude treaties and gain mining concessions from tribal chiefs on behalf of his British South Africa Company, which had been chartered by the British government to claim the territory known as Zambezia (later Rhodesia, modern day Zimbabwe and Zambia) as far north as the African Great Lakes. Though he made a sequence of important treaties on the trip, a smallpox epidemic in the intervening country stopped him from achieving the ultimate goal, which was to meet Alfred Sharpe at the court of Msiri, King of Katanga, and to assist Sharpe in incorporating the mineral-rich country into Zambezia by treaty. Thomson's role was to have brought supplies of cloth, gunpowder and other gifts with which to impress Msiri. Without these, Sharpe was rebuffed, and a year later, the Stairs Expedition led by Captain William Stairs, believing itself to be in a race with another attempt by Thomson to reach Katanga, killed Msiri and took Katanga for King Leopold II of Belgium. Unknown to the Stairs Expedition, by this time Thomson had been instructed by the British government not to go.

== Death ==
Thomson's health had deteriorated because of cystitis, schistosomiasis and pyelonephritis. In 1892, he contracted pneumonia and, seeking the right climate in which to recuperate, spent time in England, South Africa, Italy and France. He died in London in 1895, at the age of 37.

== Taxa named in honour ==
Taxa named in honour of Joseph Thomson include:

- Thompson Falls, Nyahururu, Kenya
- African gazelle, Eudorcas thomsonii, known as Thomson's gazelle
- Freshwater snail Limnotrochus thomsoni E. A. Smith, 1880
- Land snail Achatina thomsoni E. A. Smith, 1880 is a synonym of Achatina spekei Dohrn
- Freshwater bivalve Unio thomsoni E. A. Smith, 1880 is a synonym of Grandideriera burtoni (Woodward, 1859)

== Bibliography ==
=== Non-fiction ===
- To the Central African Lakes and Back – the East Central African Expedition 1878–80 (1881)
- Through Masai Land – a Journey of Exploration among the Snowclad Volcanic Mountains & Strange Tribes of Eastern Equatorial Africa – the Expedition to Mount Kenia & Lake Victoria Nyanza, 1883–84 (1885, Revised 1887)
- The Travels in the Atlas & Southern Morocco (1889)
- Mungo Park & the Niger (1890)
- "‘Niger and Central Sudan Sketches’ (‘Scottish Geographic. Magazine,’ October 1886, vol. ii.).

=== Novel ===
- Ulu: an African Romance (co-authored with Miss Harris-Smith) (1888)

== See also ==
- Nena people
- Luoland
