= Christian de Bonchamps =

French explorer

The Marquis Christian de Bonchamps
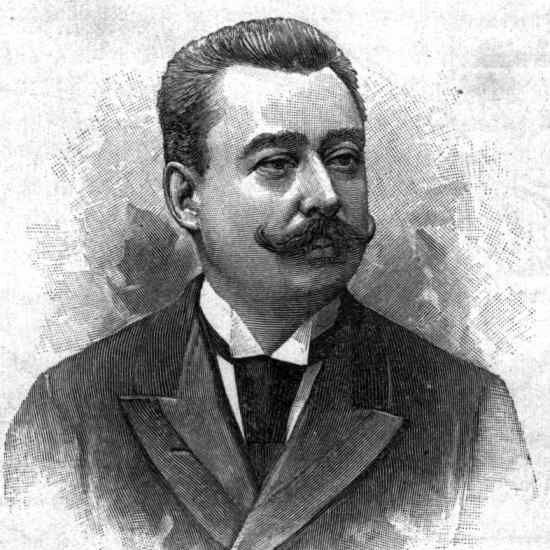
- Born: 15 June 1860; Le Mans, France
- Died: 9 December 1919 (aged 59); Paris
- Occupation: explorer

The Marquis Christian de Bonchamps (15 June 1860 – 9 December 1919) was a French explorer in Africa and a colonial officer in the French Empire during the late 19th- early 20th-century epoch known as the "Scramble for Africa", who played an important role in two of the more notorious incidents of the period.

== The Stairs Expedition ==
De Bonchamps served as a cavalry officer in France and then spent several seasons in North America, hunting in the Rocky Mountains. In 1891 he was appointed third officer of the Stairs Expedition which aimed to take possession of Katanga in Central Africa for the Belgian King Leopold II, with or without the consent of its king, Msiri.

When treaty negotiations with Msiri reached a stalemate, de Bonchamps proposed capturing Msiri and holding him hostage. Msiri typically had 300 armed warriors at his stockade, but de Bonchamps had discovered that every night, he would leave with just a handful of guards to visit his favorite wife, Maria de Fonseca, at her compound nearly two miles away.

Captain Stairs rejected the idea of the ambush in favour of an ultimatum, and this led to a confrontation in which Captain Omer Bodson shot Msiri dead. De Bonchamps was the first of the other officers to reach the scene of the shooting, and it fell to him to restore order in the chaos and to evacuate the wounded, including the dying Bodson after he had been shot in turn by one of Msiri's men.

In the aftermath, de Bonchamps and most of the expedition was incapacitated by disease and starvation. Once relieved by another expedition, they suffered hardships and starvation on the return journey to Zanzibar. De Bonchamps was in command of the expedition when Stairs was ill and after he died on the Zambezi. Only half of the expedition's total of 405 men survived.

After returning to Paris, de Bonchamps gave his journal to writer Léon Delmas who, using the pseudonym René du Pont-Jest, published in the 1892-93 issues of the magazine Tour du Monde (World Tour), an account of the events, entitled L'Expédition du Katanga. In this magazine narrative, de Bonchamps revealed that the expedition had cut off Msiri's head and hoisted it on a pole in plain view as a "barbaric lesson" to his people, a fact which the English account by Joseph Moloney omitted.

== The Fashoda Incident ==
In 1897 de Bonchamps was appointed to lead a mission from Djibouti across Ethiopia to the River Nile at Fashoda in southern Sudan, to converge with the expedition of Major Jean-Baptiste Marchand coming from Brazzaville with orders to secure the area around Fashoda as a French protectorate. The ultimate objective was an ambitious plan on the part of French government to establish an axis of French colonies across the continent from east to west, Dakar to Djibouti, in competition with the British Empire's Cape to Cairo vision of British colonies across the continent from north to south. Ethiopia, one of only two independent nations on the continent at that time, stood in the way of a French route, but its ruler Menelik II was friendly towards the French and they understood he would grant them passage.

The Ethiopian Highlands were too great an obstacle, however, and the de Bonchamps Expedition suffered accidents and attacks from hostile tribesmen. In addition, although Menelik II was helpful up to a point, he ordered a halt to the expedition in December 1897. The Marchand Expedition reached Fashoda in July 1898, but the de Bonchamps Expedition was unable to complete the journey. In September, the Marchand Expedition was confronted by a British flotilla on the Nile leading to the Fashoda Incident, which eventually resulted in a diplomatic defeat for France and the withdrawal of the Marchand Expedition.

In 1892, upon returning from the Stairs Expedition, which achieved its objectives for the Belgian king, de Bonchamps said he regretted that his suffering had not been for France. Five years later, provided with a similar opportunity, but different circumstances, to serve his country, his mission was ultimately unsuccessful.

== Death ==
De Bonchamps died in Paris in 1919, age 59.
