= Msiri =

Founder and ruler of the Yeke Kingdom

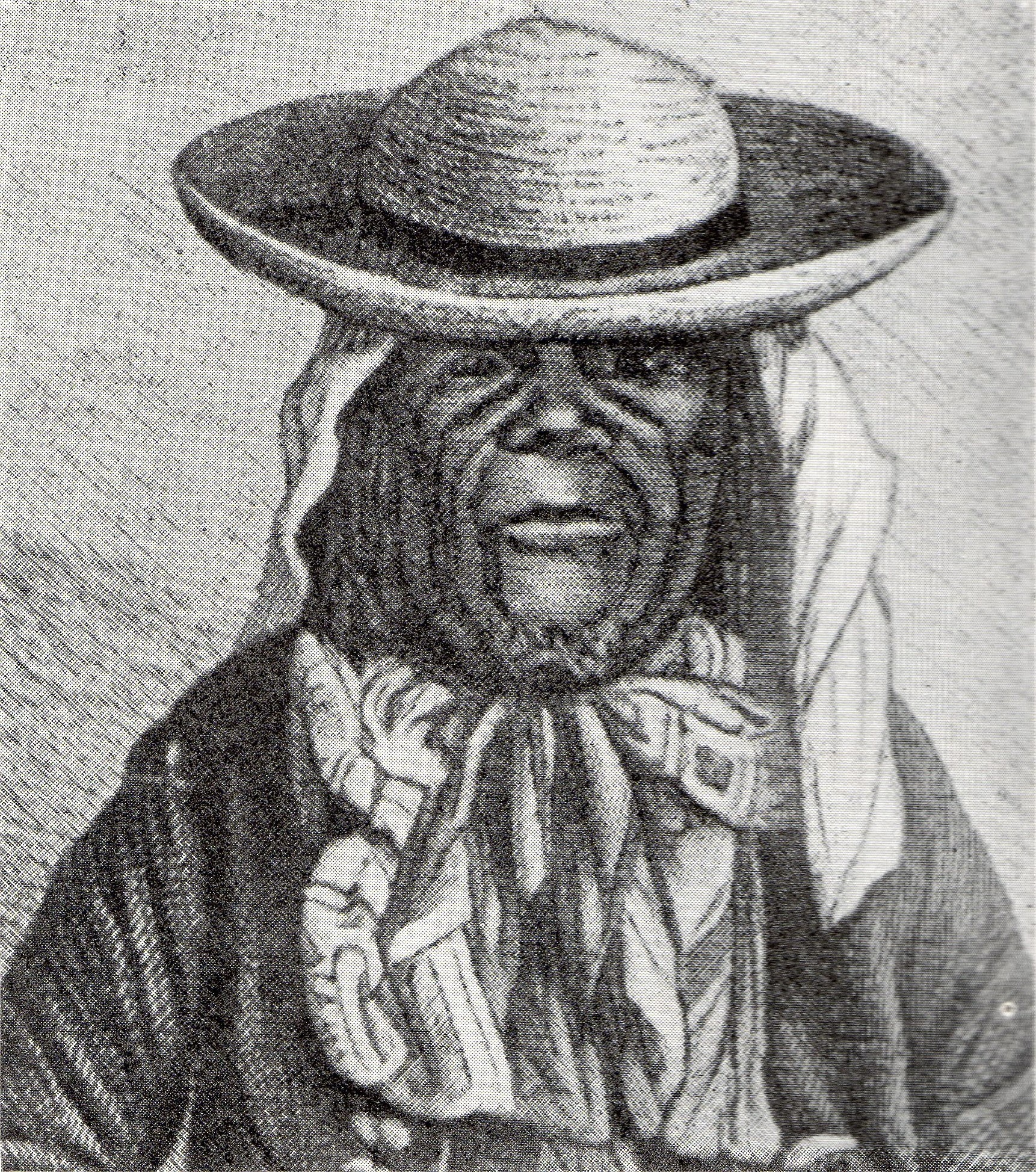
Msiri portrayed in an 1886 book.

Msiri (c. 1830 – December 20, 1891) founded and ruled the Yeke Kingdom (also called the Garanganze or Garenganze kingdom) in south-east Katanga (now in DR Congo) from about 1856 to 1891. His name is sometimes spelled 'M'Siri' in articles in French. Other variants are "Mziri", "Msidi", and "Mushidi"; and his full name was Mwenda Msiri Ngelengwa Shitambi.

== Msiri's origins and rise to power ==
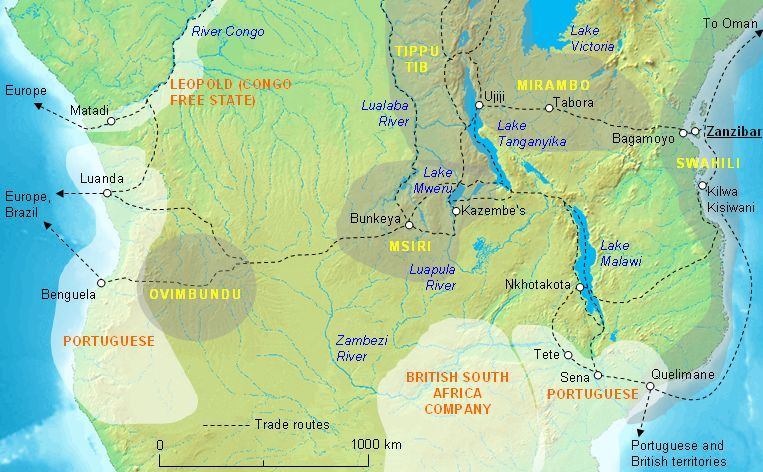
Southern Central Africa in 1890 showing the central position of Msiri's Yeke Kingdom and the principal trade routes, with the approximate territories of Msiri's main allies (names in yellow) and the approximate areas occupied by European powers (names in orange — does not show spheres of influence or borders). The east coast trade was controlled by the Sultan of Zanzibar. Areas of influence of other tribes and of France and Germany are not shown.

=== From Tabora to Katanga ===
Msiri was a Nyamwezi from Tabora in modern-day Tanzania and a trader, like his father Kalasa, involved in the copper, ivory and East African slave trade controlled by the Sultan of Zanzibar and his Arab and Swahili agents. The main trade route went to Ujiji on Lake Tanganyika and then to Lake Mweru and Katanga.

=== Military power ===
Msiri realised access to guns was the key to power, and in Katanga, he had copper and ivory resources to trade for them. He formed a militia and started to conquer his neighbours. He also married into the Luba royal family, starting his practice of using wives as spies.

He depended on the east coast trade for his guns and gunpowder, which passed through the territory of his rivals, making supplies expensive and unreliable. Instead he turned to the west coast, sending his nephew Molenga to the Ovimbundu and Portuguese traders around Benguela in Angola, and a trader there called Coimbra became his supplier. The Luba people to his north-west had controlled the west coast trade, but Msiri took it over and halted their southwards expansion.

Msiri now had the power and influence to form alliances as more of an equal with warlords such as Tippu Tip, who controlled the eastern Congo from Lake Tanganyika up to what is now Uganda in the north-east, and the Nyamwezi leader Mirambo who controlled the land route between Lake Tanganyika and the coast, and he sought to emulate them. Msiri achieved what other tribes and the Portuguese had tried without as much success, which was to trade across the continent, with both coasts.

By the time of David Livingstone's visit to Mwata Kazembe VIII in 1867, Msiri had taken control of most of the Mwata's territory and trade on the west bank of the Luapula River. Tippu Tip wanted revenge on Kazembe for killing six of his men, and he formed an alliance with Msiri to attack and kill Mwata Kazembe in 1870, and Msiri subsequently influenced the appointment of his successors. Msiri's control of south-east Katanga and its copper resources was consolidated.

=== Msiri's strategy ===
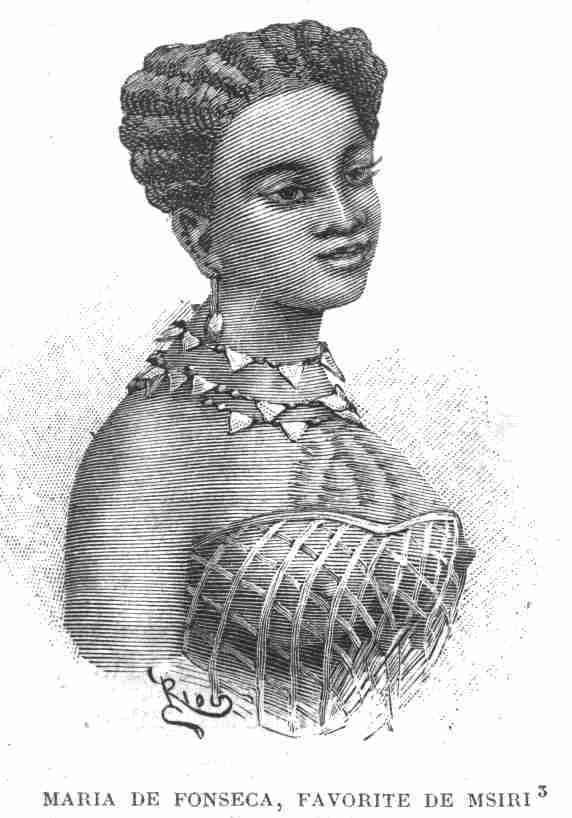
Msiri's favourite wife, the Portuguese-Angolan Maria de Fonseca, who died a grisly death at the hand of Msiri's adopted son and successor.

In a region and age dominated by armed traders, Msiri was very successful. His control of the trade routes between the Atlantic and Indian Oceans took ruthlessness and arms (and over his neighbours, Msiri had what would be called in the west ‘superior military technology’). But it also took a strategic eye, and the guile and persuasion required to form alliances with hundreds of other tribes, rulers and traders. He did this through his wives, who numbered more than 500. He took a wife from the village of each subordinate chief, making the chief think this gave him an advocate at Msiri's court, but the wife was used to spy on the chief instead and to obtain information about his dealings and loyalty. The wife could also be used as a hostage in case of any rebellion by that chief.

Msiri also cemented alliances with other powerful trading partners through marriage. His favourite wife was said to be Maria de Fonseca, sister of his Portuguese-Angolan trading partner Coimbra. Msiri married one of his own daughters to Tippu Tip.

In 1884, wishing to gain some advice on how to deal with the approaching European colonial powers, he invited a Scottish missionary, Frederick Stanley Arnot, who he had heard was in Angola, to come to his capital at Bunkeya, 180 km west of the Luapula River. In 1886 Arnot arrived and was the first white person to settle in Katanga. After three years he went back to Britain to recruit more missionaries, including Charles Swan and Dan Crawford.

Thus, the first missionaries in Katanga did not decide to go there at their own initiative. Msiri's strategy worked: the missionaries' advice prevented him being taken in by the first British and Belgian expeditions (see below). It is also possible that Msiri had the idea to hold the missionaries hostage in case of any war with the Europeans, in the same way that he held hostage the women of subject tribes.

== The scramble for Katanga and killing of Msiri ==
=== British Expeditions (Sharpe and Thomson), 1890 ===
Cecil Rhodes’ British South Africa Company (BSAC) and Belgian King Leopold II’s Congo Free State (CFS) both wanted to sign treaties with Msiri to fulfil their colonial ambitions and competed to do so. Some of Msiri's subordinate chiefs and trading competitors took the opportunity of the arrival of new powers in the region to start rebellions against his authority. In November 1890 Alfred Sharpe arrived in Bunkeya from Nyasaland on behalf of the BSAC and the British Commissioner in Central Africa/Nyasaland, Sir Harry Johnston, with a mineral rights concession and a British protectorate treaty for signature. The explorer Joseph Thomson was sent by the BSAC to meet up with and reinforce Sharpe's mission in Bunkeya, but its route was blocked by a smallpox epidemic and it could not continue.

Arnot was still in Britain but Charles Swan and Dan Crawford were present. Msiri and his officials could not read English and Sharpe described the agreement favourably, but Arnot had advised Msiri to have any treaties translated, and Swan now gave the same advice. For this the missionaries were later the subject of resentment and anger on behalf of the BSAC, because when the treaty's real contents were revealed to Msiri, enraged, he sent Sharpe away empty-handed. Sharpe was sure Msiri would not sign away his sovereignty to any other power, and he advised Johnston to wait until he was 'out of the way'.

=== Belgian Expeditions (Le Marinel and Delcommune), 1891 ===
On 18 April 1891 Leopold sent an expedition of about 350 men led by Paul Le Marinel. He obtained a brief letter signed by Msiri and witnessed by Swan (and probably drafted by him), that Msiri would accept CFS agents in his territory. It did not mention agreeing to the CFS flag being hoisted nor to recognising Leopold's sovereignty, and its lack of precision was probably designed to keep Leopold at bay, so a few months later the Delcommune Expedition followed up to try to achieve those objectives, but again Msiri refused. Expecting that the BSAC would try again with Thomson, Leopold resolved to take stronger action with his third expedition of 1891.

=== The Stairs Expedition and the killing of Msiri ===
On December 14, 1891 the armed Stairs Expedition of the CFS arrived in Bunkeya with 400 troops and porters, led by Canadian mercenary, Captain W. G. Stairs, ordered by Leopold to raise the CFS flag and claim Katanga by force if necessary. Negotiations commenced and Msiri indicated he might agree to a treaty if supplied with gunpowder.

According to the Stairs Expedition's doctor Joseph Moloney and third officer Christian de Bonchamps, with negotiations at stalemate, Msiri reacted to an ultimatum and to Stairs flying the CFS flag without his consent, by departing in the night to a fortified village at Munema on the outskirts of Bunkeya. The next day, 20 December 1891, Stairs sent his second-in-command, Belgian Lieutenant Omer Bodson with de Bonchamps and 100 askaris to arrest Msiri. Despite de Bonchamps' concerns about the danger, Bodson went into Munema with a dozen men and confronted Msiri in front of about 300 of his warriors. Msiri said nothing but in anger started to draw the sword which had been a gift from Stairs. Bodson drew his revolver and shot Msiri three times, killing him. A fight erupted, and Bodson was shot and mortally wounded by one of Msiri's men, dying later.

The oral history of the Garanganze people contains some contradictions about the incident. In one story, Msiri speared Bodson to death and was shot by other members of the expedition.

=== The fate of Msiri's head ===
In an article published in Paris in 1892, de Bonchamps revealed that having carried Msiri's body back to their camp, the expedition cut off his head and hoisted it on a pole as a 'barbaric lesson' to the Garanganze. Moloney's book is silent on the subject. Dan Crawford was at a Belgian outpost 40 km away and, relying on a Garanganze report, he wrote that after shooting Msiri, 'Bodson' cut off his head and shouted "I have killed a tiger! Vive le Roi!".

Garanganze oral history says that the body returned to them by Stairs for burial was headless, and that the expedition kept the head. One account says that it cursed and killed everyone who carried it and eventually, this included Stairs himself, who died of malaria six months later on the return journey, and it was alleged he had with him Msiri's head in a can of kerosene. The history of Msiri's successors says that the head was buried under a hill of stones in Zambia, but it also says Msiri's successor 'caught and killed all the Europeans on the expedition'.

In 1974 Congolese artist Tshibumba Kanda-Matulu said:

In all truth, we don't know where this head went. Is it in Europe, in some Museum, in the house of Leopold II, or with whom? Up to this day, we don't know."

=== Katanga after Msiri ===
The expedition's askaris massacred many of Msiri's people that day at Munema, and the population dispersed. On condition he sign CFS treaties, Stairs installed Msiri's adopted son as chief in his place but of a much reduced area, and restored the Wasanga chieftainships which Msiri had overthrown 30 years before. The Stairs Expedition left after seven weeks when another CFS expedition (the Bia Expedition) arrived from north. It was too small to maintain effective control, and moved to eastern Katanga. Left without any CFS troops to keep the peace, disorder and instability occupied the vacuum left by Msiri for some time as the chiefs fought among themselves, and Dan Crawford moved to Lake Mweru and set up a mission to which many Garanganze moved to escape the strife.

The British accepted the Congo Free State's possession of Katanga (the administration of which Leopold vested in the Compagnie du Katanga) and an Anglo-Belgian agreement was signed in 1894. The slave trade from south-east Katanga to Lake Tanganyika declined, though in the Congo Free State slavery as practiced by King Leopold II's agents did not end until after the country was taken over by the Belgian state in 1908. Some of the Garanganze people returned to Bunkeya and continued the Garanganze chieftaincy which, despite internal exile for some years, continues to this day, using the name 'Mwami Mwenda' after Msiri's first name, ruling a population of about 20,000.

== Evaluation ==
According to one European source:

There can be little doubt, judging from various contemporary accounts, that his rule was arbitrary, vindictive, cruel, and despotic. He was a warlord who enslaved his neighbours and whose capital was surrounded by palisades on which hung the skulls of his enemies.

=== Cruel punishments ===
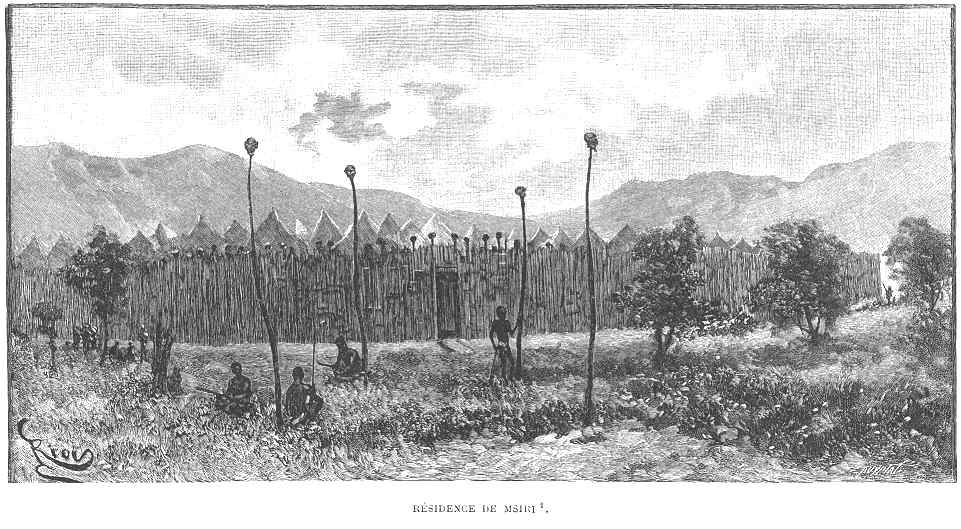
Msiri's boma at Bunkeya. The objects on top of the four poles, below which some of Msiri's warriors are gathered, are heads of his enemies. More skulls are on the stakes forming the stockade.

Msiri was said to punish his enemies and other miscreants by mutilation (cutting off ears), burial up to the neck and being left to starve, or being shut up in a hut to be eaten by a pack of starving dogs. Execution by beheading was certainly carried out, as witnessed by the heads placed on poles. Ironically the Stairs expedition meted out the same treatment to Msiri himself.

Msiri's capital Bunkeya and surrounding villages had a population estimated at 60,000–80,000 in 1891. A year after Msiri's death, it was 10,000–20,000. In that part of Africa people disperse into the bush when threatened. For instance, David Livingstone reported twenty years earlier that Mwata Kazembe VII Chinkonkole Kafuti so tyrannised his people that many had moved away, and he could muster scarcely 1000 men. Continuing the contrast with Msiri, when the assassins sent by Msiri and Tippu Tib advanced on his boma, Chinkonkole Kafuti's people did not warn him, but let him be taken by surprise.

=== Arnot's description of Msiri ===
Of the contemporary written accounts of Msiri, all were by or based on accounts of people in the pay of either Leopold or the BSAC, the only exception being Arnot and his missionary colleagues, the closest there were to neutral observers. Arnot referred to Msiri as "a thorough gentleman," and established a working relationship with him, with a certain amount of mutual respect. Msiri gave Arnot land to build his own hut, a small clinic, a church, and a school. When Arnot returned to London he recruited three more missionaries to go to Msiri in Bunkeya.

Arnot's diaries say of living in Bunkeya:

... the quietness and peace that reigns is remarkable. The fear of Msidi is great. He is sharp and severe in his government, though I see or hear of nothing in the way of torture or cruelty ... executions are common, but death is inflicted at once ... [the cases] have been those of actual crime....

=== The Stairs Expedition's reports ===
A political quotations website offers these as the last words of Omer Bodson:

I don't mind dying now that I've killed Msiri. Thank God my death will not be in vain. I've delivered Africa from one of her most detestable tyrants.
— Omer Bodson, dying words to Military Doctor Moloney.

Moloney, the Stairs Expedition's doctor, wrote up his account on his return to London in 1892. Influenced by the writings of men such as Livingstone, public opinion in Britain began to clamor for reforms which benefited the indigenous subjects of the British Empire. Moloney noted that Msiri had his "apologists" in London. King Leopold had to legitimise his Congo Free State's claim to Katanga under the Berlin Conference's Principle of Effectivity, so a justification for the killing of Msiri was required. The Stairs Expedition's reports were used in Europe to emphasise self-defence as the reason for his death, coupled with the claim he was a bloodthirsty tyrant. Moloney's quotation of Bodson's dramatic dying words helped in this respect.

The question remains as to whether Msiri was being described as a bloodthirsty tyrant to the same extent before he was killed, when his signature to a treaty was being assiduously courted by the imperial powers.

== See also ==
- William Grant Stairs
  - Stairs Expedition
- Yeke Kingdom
- Yeke people
- Katanga Province
- Congo Free State
- Maria de Fonseca
- Alfred Sharpe
- Omer Bodson
- Joseph Moloney
- Christian de Bonchamps
- Congo Pedicle
- 1884–85 Berlin Conference
- Mwata Kazembe
