= Tolo, Democratic Republic of the Congo =

Coordinates: 2.925715°S 18.532981°E

Tolo is a town on the Lukenie River in Kutu territory of Mai-Ndombe province of the Democratic Republic of the Congo. It was founded as a colonial post by Alexandre Delcommune around 1887.
