= Luoland =

Homeland of the Luo people

Luoland (historically "Kavirondo") is the tribal homeland of the Kenya Luo (also called Jo-Luo or Kavirondo), a people of western Kenya, also extending into eastern Uganda and northern Tanzania. This area consists roughly of the basin surrounding Winam Gulf of Lake Victoria. Non-Luo tribal areas abutting upon Luoland include those of the Padhola (to the west, in Uganda), the Luhya and Nandi (to the north), the Kipsigis (to the east), and the Gusii and Kuria (to the south).

The first Luo migrants to present day Luoland arrived from present day Uganda sometime around 1500 AD. The first European to enter Luoland was Joseph Thomson who struggled into the Kavirondo village of Kabaras on 28 November 1883. Thomson was shocked and made much ado over the habitual nakedness of the Luo which was in marked contrast with the tribes he had previously travelled among, but he ultimately decided that "morality has nothing to do with clothes" because the Luo were "the most moral of all the tribes in this region".

Kisumu is the largest town in Luoland, and also the third (or fourth) largest city in Kenya.
