= Alexandre Delcommune =

Belgian officer

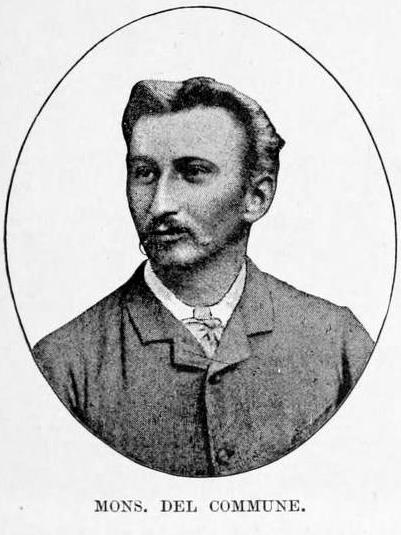
- Portrait from HM Stanley's book The Congo and the founding of its free state; a story of work and exploration (1885)
- Born: 6 October 1855; Namur, Belgium
- Died: 7 August 1922 (aged 66); Brussels, Belgium
- Known for: Exploration of the Congo Basin

Alexandre Delcommune (6 October 1855 – 7 August 1922) was a Belgian officer of the armed Force Publique of the Congo Free State who undertook extensive explorations of the country during the early colonial period of the Congo Free State. He explored many of the navigable waterways of the Congo Basin, and led a major expedition to Katanga between 1890 and 1893.

== Early years ==
Delcommune was born at Namur on 6 October 1855. His father had reached the rank of sergeant major in the engineer corps before retiring and joining the Belgian and French railways. Alexandre Delcommune studied at the Athenaeum in Brussels, then worked for three months as a clerk in the Brussels North railway station before quitting due to boredom.

He traveled to Portugal in January 1874 to work for his half brother, the director of a French olive oil factory. Still restless, he got his brother to write a letter of recommendation to one of his Portuguese friends so that he could go to Brazil or Portugal. After less than six months he arrived in São Paulo de Loanda, modern Luanda. Delcommune travelled from Luanda to Ambriz where he joined the French merchant Lasnier-Daumas, Lartigue et Cie. At that time he was one of just sixteen Europeans living in the Congo, and the only Belgian. He arrived at Boma in 1874. He received Henry Morton Stanley in 1877 during Stanley's crossing of the continent from east to west.

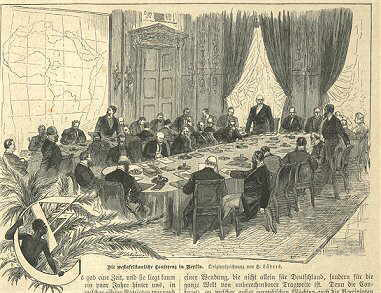
The Berlin Conference on partition of Africa, 1884

In 1883 Delcommune joined the Association Internationale Africaine. A year later he was appointed director of the Belgian factories in Boma and Noki, and became head of the future capital of the Congo Free State at Boma. He was tasked with getting the local chiefs to accept Belgian sovereignty, and on 19 April 1884 three important agreements were signed. Delcommune had succeeded due to his long familiarity with Boma and to having married a daughter of the principal chief of Boma. The other Europeans trading on the lower Congo River were furious with what they saw as his deception in gaining the treaties. Despite an Anglo-Portuguese treaty signed in February 1884, he obtained recognition of the Etat Independent du Congo, and this was ratified in the Berlin Conference (1884) in which the territory at the mouth of the Congo was divided between the Portuguese, French and Belgians.

== Congo basin survey ==
In 1886 Delcommune was given a commission by Albert Thys to study whether a planned railway would be profitable. This involved exploring the whole navigable part of the Congo basin, determining what types and quantities of merchandise could be expected, and assessing whether this would justify the investment. For this mission he organized the transport of the components of the steamer Le Roi des Belges overland to Leopoldville, where the boat was assembled. The journey took four months, with another five months to assemble the steamer and launch it. He then explored the Kasai, the Fimi, the Sankuru, Lake Leopold II, the Lubefu, the Kwango and the Kwilu. He went as far up the Congo as Stanley Falls, ascended the Lomami and explored the Aruwimi. He covered 12,000 kilometres (7,500 mi) of water routes in a year.

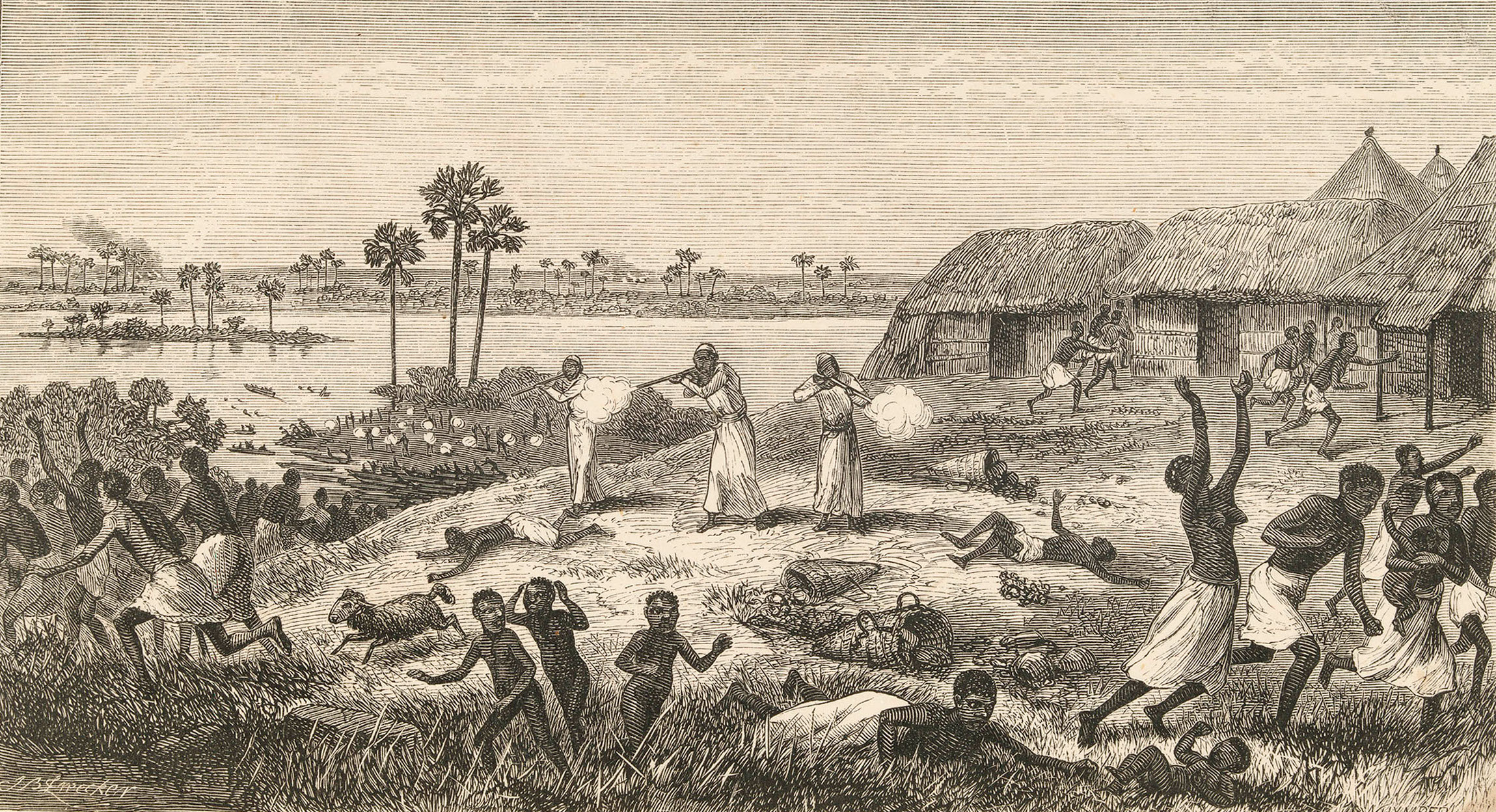
Slavers attack nearby Nyangwe

Delcommune founded the posts of Nioki, Tolo and Dekese among others in the Mai Ndombe District. During this trip he settled an outstanding geographical question when he determined that the Lomani was indeed a tributary of the Congo as Stanley had suspected. He also found that Nyangwe, an important slave-trading center on the Lualaba River, was just three days journey east of the Lomami.

His ascent of the Lomani, which he found to be easy to navigate, took seventeen days and covered over 570 miles (920 km) to around latitude 4° South. Running parallel to the Congo, which it enters below the barrier of the Stanley Falls, it reaches far to the south. This discovery opened an important route into the interior.

== Katanga expedition ==
Albert Thys founded the Compagnie Congolaise pour le Commerce et l'Industrie (CCCI) in 1887. King Leopold granted him extensive trading privileges since his enterprise was seen as a bastion against British interests. When Delcommune returned to Brussels in 1889, he was given charge of a CCCI expedition to Katanga (1890–1893). The "Compagnie du Katanga" formed for the expedition was theoretically a private organization, but in practice was an instrument of the Congo Free State. Preparation for the expedition began in May 1890, and the expedition left Matadi in September of that year. With Delcommune were the geologist Diderrich, the naturalist Protche, doctor Briard, Baron de Roest d'Alkemade and Count Soutchoff. Delcommune was charged with exploring the region and examining its local wealth and the problems of transport and communications. The expedition left Kinshasa on 17 October 1890 on two steamers. Ville de Bruxelles was provided by the state and Florida was provided by the Haut Congo Society. (Note: The future author Joseph Conrad had traveled to the Congo in the hope of joining Delcommune's 1890 expedition as captain of the Florida, but was met with hostility by Delcommune's brother Camille and did not get the job. Conrad drew on his experience while in the Congo in his novel Heart of Darkness.)

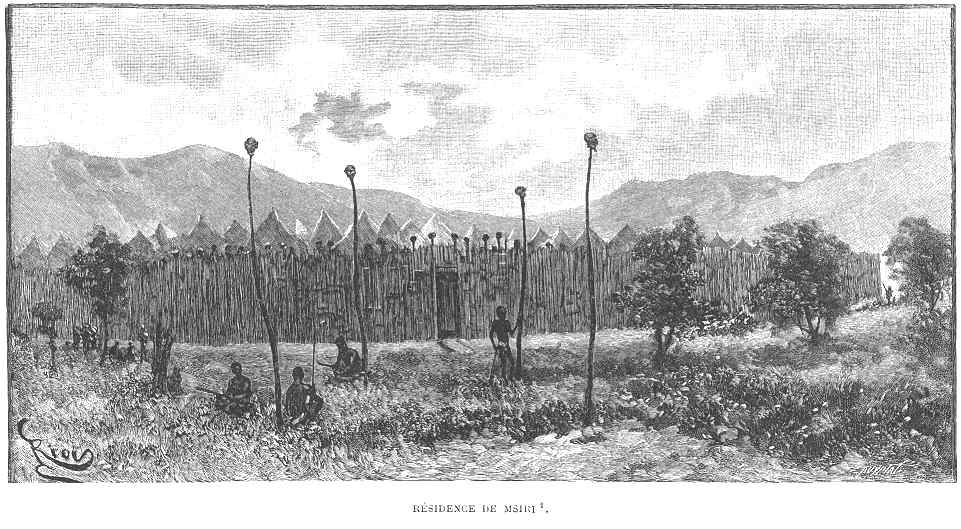
Msiri's boma (compound) at Bunkeya. The objects on top of the four poles, below which some of Msiri's warriors are gathered, are heads of his enemies. More skulls are on the stakes forming the stockade.

In Katanga, the Nyamwezi trader Msiri had seized power around 1860, expanding his empire to cover a large part of the Luapula valley. By the time of Delcommune's expedition his rule had greatly contracted, but both the Belgians in the free State and the British in Southern Africa were determined to fully control the mineral-rich area of Katanga. Msiri refused to make any formal treaty with either power. Cecil Rhodes had told an agent of the British South Africa Company "I want you to get Msiri's. I mean Katanga... You must go and get Katanga". A small force of Belgians from an expedition led by Paul Le Marinel had been allowed to establish a post near to Msiri's capital early in 1891.

Delcommune's expedition was primarily concerned with finding gold, and secondarily with settling the country. Delcommune was to try to make Msiri accept Belgian rule, and then go south to where the gold fields were thought to be. His chosen route up the Lualaba from Bena-Kamba turned out to be extremely difficult, with many rapids to be negotiated. On 3 May 1891 the expedition reached N'Gongo-Lutita. There they met Rachid, the nephew and successor of Tippoo-Tib, who lent them porters. Delcommune went on by land, making treaties with the local chiefs as he went. Delcommune's expedition reached Bunkeya in October 1891, but he was unable to persuade Msiri to accept Belgian rule and continued south.

In December 1891 a larger expedition arrived at Bunkeya from Zanzibar. At the age of 25 the Canadian-born engineer, soldier and mercenary William Grant Stairs had been second in command of Henry Morton Stanley's 1887 expedition to relieve Emin Pasha in Equatoria. In 1891 he was commissioned to lead an expedition to Bunkeya to obtain Msiri's submission. Stairs demanded that Msiri accept the sovereignty of Leopold II over his territory. Msiri again refused and fled to a nearby village where he was killed by members of Stairs' force. Resistance ceased and Katanga came under Belgian rule.

In August 1892, Delcommune's expedition was returning north by way of Lake Tanganyika, where he came to the assistance of a group of missionaries from the London Missionary Society at Albertville who were threatened by Arab slavers. However, in an attempt to gain control of the Arab fort the Belgians were beaten off. Out of the 650 men that left on Delcommune's expedition, 543 had lost their lives by the time it ended in February 1893.

== Later career ==
After the Katanga expedition Delcommune assumed an important role in the CCCI group of companies. He returned to Europe in 1895, where he was offered a position as Inspector of the Free State by King Leopold II of Belgium. Delcommune refused, not wanting to spend more time in Africa. In his memoirs, written much later, he said that he disagreed with the brutal techniques being used in developing the rubber economy. He did return to the Congo the same year as an inspector of the SAB. He continued to travel, visiting Brazil and the Dutch and British colonies in Asia. He also became part owner with Albert Thys of a cocoa plantation in São Tomé.

During the First World War Delcommune was the author of a sharp attack on the colonial administration. He called for improved sanitation, a pragmatic education system focused mainly on agriculture, and measures to reduce the price of goods in the colony but to impose minimum prices for native products. Delcommune died in Brussels on 7 August 1922.

== Legacy ==
A Belgian steamer on Lake Tanganyika that fought against the forces of German East Africa during the First World War was named the Alexandre Del Commune. His name was given to the artificial Lake Delcommune, near Kolwezi, formed by a dam across the Lualaba to provide hydroelectric power and a water supply to the copper mining operations.

== Bibliography ==
- Delcommune, Alexandre (1919). L'avenir du Congo Belge menacé: bilan des dix premières années (1909–1918) d'administration coloniale gouvernementale. Le mal – le remède ... J. Lebègue. p. 642.
- Delcommune, Alexandre (1920). Le Congo, la plus belle colonie du monde: ce que nous devons faire. Office de Publicité, J. Lebèque. p. 139.
- Delcommune, Alexandre (1921). Notre voyage au Congo en 1920. Office de publicité, J. Lebègue. pp. 92.
- Delcommune, Alexandre (1922). Vingt années de vie africaine. Larcier.
- Comité Spécial du Katanga (1950). Comité Spécial du Katanga (1900–1950). Editions Cuypers, Bruxelles. p. 327.

== Sources ==
- Bekina, Jacques Mpia (2010). L'évangélisation du Mai-Ndombe au Congo-Kinshasa: histoire, difficultés présentes et inculturation (in French). Editions L'Harmattan. ISBN 978-2-296-12452-3.
- Briart, Paul; Ryelandt, Dominique (2003). Aux sources du fleuve Congo: Carnets du Katanga, 1890–1893 (in French). Editions L'Harmattan. ISBN 2-7475-4861-9.
- De Coster, Pieter (1997). "Biografie van Alexandre Delcommune". De eerste Europese ontdekkingsreizen in Katanga 1797–1897 (in Dutch).
- De Pont-Jest, René (1892). "L'Expédition du Katanga, d'après les notes de voyage du marquis Christian de Bonchamps". Le Tour du Monde (in French).
- "Exploration of the Lomami". Scottish Geographical Magazine. 5. Royal Scottish Geographical Society. 1889.
- Gochet, Alexis-Marie (1896). Soldats et missionnaires au Congo, de 1891 à 1894 (in French). Desclée De Brouwer & Cie.
- Moloney, Joseph A. (2007). With Captain Stairs to Katanga: Slavery and Subjugation in the Congo 1891–92. Jeppestown Press. ISBN 978-0-9553936-5-5.
- Ndaywel è Nziem, Isidore (1998). Histoire Generale du Congo (in French). De Boeck Supérieur. ISBN 2-8011-1174-0.
- Paice, Edward (2008). Tip & Run: The Untold Tragedy of the Great War in Africa. Phoenix. ISBN 978-0-7538-2349-1.
- Sherry, Norman (1980). Conrad's Western World. Cambridge University Press. ISBN 0-521-29808-3.
- Spargo, R. Clifton; Ehrenreich, Robert M. (2010). After representation?: the Holocaust, literature, and culture. Rutgers University Press. ISBN 978-0-8135-4590-5.
- Swann, Alfred James (1969). Fighting the slave-hunters in Central Africa: a record of twenty-six years of travel and adventure round the Great Lakes and of the overthrow of Tip-Pu-Tib, Rumaliza and other great slave-traders. Routledge. ISBN 0-7146-1879-9.
- Yav, André (1990). History from below: the Vocabulary of Elisabethville by André Yav : texts, translation, and interpretive essay. John Benjamins Publishing Company. ISBN 90-272-5227-0.
- Archive Alanxandre Delcommune, Royal museum for Central Africa
