= Dan Crawford =

Scottish missionary (1869–1926)

Daniel Crawford (7 December 1869 – 3 June 1926), also known as 'Konga Vantu', was a Scottish missionary of the Plymouth Brethren in central-southern Africa.

== Early life ==
He was born in Gourock, son of a Clyde boat captain. He was influenced to go to Africa by meeting Frederick Arnot in 1888, a missionary who had just returned from two years at Bunkeya, capital of the Garenganze King, Msiri, where he had founded the Plymouth Brethren's Garenganze Evangelical Mission.

== Bunkeya (1890–1891) ==
Crawford arrived at Bunkeya in November 1890 to join two Plymouth Brethren already at the mission. He was therefore a junior observer rather than a player in the dramatic events of late 1891 when British and Belgian expeditions competed to take Msiri's kingdom into their respective colonies, and Msiri was killed by Lieutenant Bodson of the Belgian expedition.

== Luanza mission ==
In the aftermath of the killing and a massacre of Msiri's men, the 10,000-strong population of Bunkeya fled into the bush, and Crawford moved to the western shore of Lake Mweru and established a mission there. The Congo Free State's agents took over Katanga with a brutality which caused many refugees to come to Crawford's mission, which was the origin of his nickname 'Konga Vantu' which means 'gatherer of the people'. Crawford also persuaded many chiefs to give up their slaves whom he took into his mission. Soon he had to move to a better site which could support more people at the Luanza River near where it flows into Lake Mweru.

Crawford was an individualist who did not work well for long in the company of his seniors or colleagues, but he did much to travel around the Luapula valley founding and encouraging other outposts of the Garenganze Evangelical Mission. He studied African languages and sought to understand African customs and traditional rule, and was a frequent visitor to chiefs such as Mwata Kazembe. When the latter rebelled against and was defeated by the British, Crawford and his mission colleagues had a role in persuading the chief to accept the inevitable and to achieve a working relationship with the colonial authorities. His book Thinking Black (1912) was recommended reading for those Europeans who wanted to work in partnership with, rather than over, Africans.

Crawford also encouraged other Protestant missions to come to Luapula, such as the London Missionary Society, and he was invited to open the new church at their Mbereshi Mission, which he did in 1920.

== Translation ==
Crawford translated the New Testament into Luba, which was printed for the National Bible Society of Scotland at the Livingstonia Mission press in 1904. He revised it in 1923, and finished translating the Old Testament on 31 December 1925, five months before his death. The National Bible Society of Scotland then published the whole Bible in Edinburgh in 1928 as the first complete Bible in a Luba language.

== Personal life ==
Despite once believing that a missionary should not marry, Crawford married Grace Tilsley at Blantyre on 14 September 1896, and continued to be based at Luanza until his death in 1926. He only returned to Britain once, although he did visit the US and Australia to recruit missionaries and obtain funding.

One of Dan Crawford's grandchildren is Mairi Hedderwick, author and illustrator of the Katie Morag series of children's picture books.

== Works ==
- Ntestamente Yipia ya Nkambo wetu ni Mupurushi Yesu Kristu (New Testament in Luba-Sanga). Livingstonia: National Bible Society of Scotland, 1904.
- Thinking Black: 22 Years without a Break in the Long Grass of Central Africa. London: Morgan and Scott; New York: George H. Doran, 1912.
- Not Lawful to Utter, and Other Bible Readings. New York: Hodder & Stoughton / George H. Doran, 1914.
- Back to the Long Grass: My Link with Livingstone. New York: George H. Doran, 1923.
