= Yeke people =

Tribe of Katanga who established the Yeke Kingdom

The Garanganze, Yeke or Bayeke are a people of Katanga, in the Democratic Republic of Congo. They established the Yeke Kingdom under the warrior-king Msiri, who dominated the southern part of Central Africa from 1850 to 1891 and controlled the trade route between Angola and Zanzibar from his capital, at Bunkeya.

Msiri and his people were originally Nyamwezi traders from around Tabora who migrated to Katanga to reach the source of copper, ivory and slaves to trade. They took over and merged with a Wasanga chieftainship and established a powerful base by conquering neighbouring tribes.

In 1891, Msiri was killed by the Stairs Expedition sent by King Leopold II of Belgium to take possession of Katanga for his Congo Free State. Many of the Yeke dispersed, with some settling in the Luapula Valley and the western shores of Lake Mweru around the Garanganze Missions of the Plymouth Brethren, led by Dan Crawford. Others who had been regarded as the Yeke were reabsorbed into the Wasanga ethnic group. Consequently, the Yeke or Garanganze now number only about 20,000 and speak Kisanga and Swahili, Yeke (Kiyeke) now being a language that is used only for ceremonial occasions.

== Mwami Mwenda chieftainship ==
The Garanganze still maintain the Mwami Mwenda chieftainship at Bunkeya, after it was exiled by the Belgian colonial authorities for some years to the Lufoi River. The chieftainship is named in honour of Msiri whose full name was Mwenda Msiri Ngelengwa Shitambi. The current chief who was enthroned in 1997 is Mwami Mwenda VIII, named Mwenda-Bantu Godefroid Munonga.

The official history of the Garanganze claims that the chieftainship survived despite neglect and opposition from the Belgian colonial authorities. However other sources say that the Belgians, whose first treaty in Katanga was with Mwami Mwenda II Mukanda-Bantu whom they had installed after killing Msiri, used the chieftainship to bolster colonial rule, conferring on the chiefs an importance which the Yeke, a relatively small tribe, did not warrant from their numbers.

Mwami Mwenda VI Godefroid Munonga was involved in the Katanga secession crisis and was appointed Minister of the Interior of the breakaway state. After Katanga was reunited with the Congo, he was imprisoned by Mobutu for a few years and after his release he was enthroned as chief in 1976.

== See also ==
- Msiri
- Yeke Kingdom
- Stairs Expedition
