= Paul Le Marinel =

American-born officer in the Belgian army

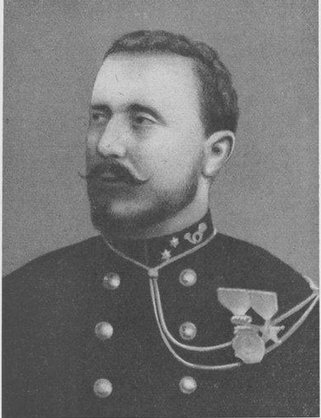
Paul Le Marinel

Paul-Amédée Le Marinel (1858–1912) was an American-born officer in the Belgian army who became an explorer and administrator in the Congo Free State. He was best known for his expedition to Katanga in 1891.

== Early years ==
Paul-Amédée Le Marinel was the son of Amédée Le Marinel, a French soldier from Normandy who had joined the Belgian revolutionaries in 1830, and then served for eighteen years in the Belgian army. In 1858 Amédée emigrated to the U.S. and started a farm in Long Grove, Iowa where his two sons, Paul and George, were born. In 1868 the family returned to Belgium, and in 1876 Paul Le Marinel enrolled in the military school, graduating in 1878 with the rank of Sergeant. He served in the 13th Line Regiment for a year, then for a few years in the riflemen's regiment. His brother Georges Le Marinel also joined the army and served in the Congo.

== First Congo posting ==
In 1885 Paul Le Marinel was seconded to the Military Cartographic Institute and was sent to the Congo where he was assigned to the topographical brigade led by Captain Jungers. Soon after arriving he was transferred to Luluabourg, the administrative capital of the Kasai district, which had been founded a year earlier by the German explorer Hermann Wissmann. Wissmann went on an expedition to the Lubi, leaving Le Marinel in command of the post, but was soon forced to return due to hostile natives and a smallpox epidemic. In July 1886 Wissmann left on another expedition, taking Le Marinel in the party. When they reached Nyangwe they heard news that the Arabs had taken the post at Stanley Falls. Wissmann decided to press on with a caravan of sixty of the best troops, leaving Le Marinel to return to Luluaberg with the much weakened remainder of the expedition.

Back in Luluaburg, Le Marinel received a message from Luebo reporting that the natives around the post had revolted. Le Marinel decided to crush the rebellion. His native troops deserted when they saw the enemy. The war was a disaster and Le Marinel only narrowly escaped death. During his retreat, Le Marinel meet the chief Zappo Zap near Lusambo. Zappo Zap's warriors were soon to become important allies of the Belgians.

In 1888 Le Marinel was due to return to Europe for leave after his three-year term. While in Boma in April 1888 waiting to embark, he met Alexandre Delcommune, who had a commission from Albert Thys, assistant to King Leopold II of Belgium and founder of the Congo Compagnie de Commerce et d'Industrie. Delcommune was exploring the rivers of the Congo Basin to determine the economic potential of a railway along the lower Congo river. He persuaded Le Marinel to delay his return to Europe to assist in exploration of the Kasaï, Sankuru and Lubefu.

== Second Congo posting ==
In late July 1889 Le Marinel returned to Boma to start his second term of service. He had been promoted to lieutenant and was appointed Commissioner of the Kasai-Lualaba district. He was assigned two main tasks. One was the creation of a military post near Luluaburg. Arab or Swahili traders had penetrated to the Great Lakes from the east coast of Africa, and were pressing into the Congo Basin in search of slaves and ivory. The military post was to defend against this threat, and it was left to Le Marinel to choose a suitable place. Le Marinel chose Lusambo, at the end of the navigable portion of the Sankuru River and in May 1890 was at this place. The Governor-General, Camille Smith, asked Le Marinel to investigate Bena Kamba, a town on the Lomami, as an alternative place for the post. Le Marinel did so against his will, but eventually Lusambo was chosen. The station would soon become one of the most important military posts of the Belgian Congo. Le Marinel brought the Zappo Zaps to Luluabourg, where they were used to enforce the government's policy of taxation and forced labor in the Kasai, earning a reputation for great brutality.

Le Marinel's second task, given to him directly by Leopold II, was to occupy Katanga. Le Marinel left Lusambo on 23 December 1890 with instructions to raise the Belgian flag in Bunkeya, the Katangan capital, 1,300 kilometres (810 mi) distant. The expedition included 180 African soldiers, many of whom were Hausa, and 150 porters. They marched along the Lubi through a well-populated region that had not previously been visited by Europeans, and crossed the Sankuru River. In January 1891 the group reached Luaba, where they asked permission to cross the Kanyok state controlled by Kabw Muzemb, a well-armed slaver. They were allowed to proceed, and arrived at the Kanyok capital on 26 January 1891. After a week, the expedition prepared to move on. Through a misunderstanding, a fight broke out and the buildings in the king's compound were burned down. The expedition moved on to the Luilu River, where they built canoes to make the crossing. In March the expedition crossed the Lualaba, where they met a representative of Msiri, the ruler of Katanga. Continuing south, on 18 April 1891 they reached Bunkeya and were received courteously by Msiri. Le Marinel spent seven weeks at Bunkeya, but was unable to persuade Msiri to formally accept Belgian authority. He left a small garrison nearby to observe developments and returned to Lusambo, arriving on 18 August 1891.

An expedition under Delcommune reached Bunkeya later that year, but had no more success. In April 1892, Le Marinel handed over command of the fortified post of Lusambo and the Kasai/Lualaba region to Francis Dhanis, and returned to Belgium.

== Later career ==
Le Marinel returned to Congo in 1893 as a state inspector. That year he had to send an expedition to rescue Francis Dhanis, who was fighting the Arabs at Nyangwe. In 1894 he was commissioned to undertake an inspection trip to the Uélé River near the northern border of the Free State which was disputed with the French, and to make comprehensive reforms in the administration. He had to deal with constant quarrels between his officials and others in the Free State, and at this time began drinking heavily.

Le Marinel returned to Europe in 1896. He served in the army in Belgium for some time, being promoted to Captain Commandant in 1897. He left the Army in 1899. He received many offers from trading companies to assist in their enterprises in Central Africa, but did not return there until 1906, in the capacity of a director of the Compagnie du Lomami. The job was disappointing. The pioneering days were over and most of the work was routine administration. The system was inefficient and there were many abuses. Still, Le Marinel accepted another job in 1908 as director of the Société Anonyme Belge pour le Commerce du Haut-Congo.

In January 1910 he left the Congo for good, with his health fast deteriorating. He died in 1912, aged little more than 54 years.

The Le Marinel hydroelectric station near Kolwezi in Katanga was opened in 1956, named in his memory. The dam is 68 metres (223 ft) high and 180 metres (590 ft) long, and produced an average of 1,430 million kWh per year.

== Sources ==
- Benedetto, Robert (1996). Presbyterian reformers in Central Africa: a documentary account of the American Presbyterian Congo Mission and the human rights struggle in the Congo, 1890-1918. BRILL. ISBN 90-04-10239-6.
- Bradshaw, Richard; Fandos-Rius, Juan (27 May 2016), Historical Dictionary of the Central African Republic, Rowman & Littlefield Publishers, ISBN 978-0-8108-7992-8
- De Coster, Pieter (1997). "Biografie van Paul Le Marinel". De eerste Europese ontdekkingsreizen in Katanga 1797-1897 (in Dutch).
- de Villers, Gauthier (1999). Cahiers africains, Issues 35-36 (in French). Editions L'Harmattan. ISBN 2-7384-7326-1.
- Meuris, Christine (2001). "SCRAMBLE FOR KATANGA".
- Moloney, Joseph A. (2007). With Captain Stairs to Katanga: Slavery and Subjugation in the Congo 1891-92. Jeppestown Press. ISBN 978-0-9553936-5-5.
- Vansina, Jan (2010). Being colonized: the Kuba experience in rural Congo, 1880-1960. Univ of Wisconsin Press. ISBN 978-0-299-23644-1.
- Yoder, John C. (2002). The Kanyok of Zaire: An Institutional and Ideological History to 1895. Cambridge University Press. ISBN 0-521-52310-9.
