= Omer Bodson =

Belgian officer

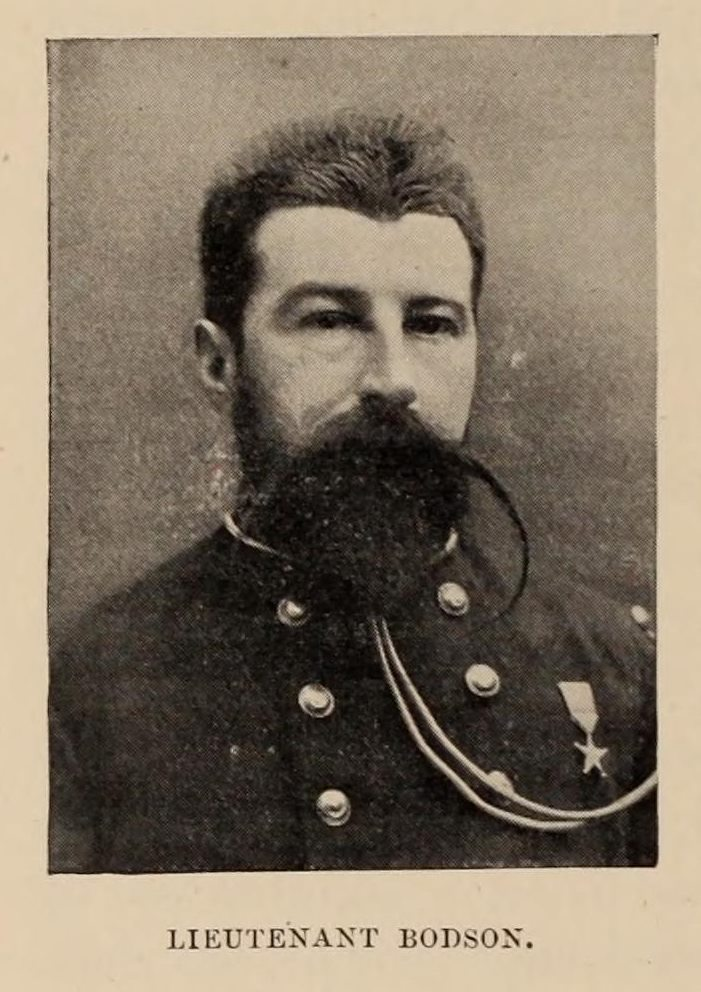
Photograph of Bodson from Demetrius C. Boulger's Congo State (1898).

Omer Bodson (5 January 1856 – 20 December 1891) was the Belgian officer who shot and killed Msiri, King of Garanganze (Katanga) on 20 December 1891 at Bunkeya in what is now the DR Congo. Bodson was then killed by one of Msiri's men.

== Military career ==
Omer Bodson was born on 5 January 1856 in Liège. He enlisted in the Belgian military and then joined the military service of King Leopold II of Belgium's Congo Free State in 1887, and was stationed at Mateba then Stanley Falls where he assisted the Emin Pasha Relief Expedition. He court-martialled the African soldier who shot Major Barttelot, leader of the Rear Column of that expedition.

Bodson returned to Belgium in 1889 as a captain of the Belgian Carbineers and took part in the suppression of riots in Liège, receiving the personal thanks of King Leopold.

== Stairs Expedition and the killing of Msiri ==
Bodson was appointed as second-in-command of the Congo Free State's Stairs Expedition sent to take possession of Katanga, now a province in DR Congo. The leader of the expedition, Canadian mercenary Captain William Stairs, sent Bodson and the Marquis Christian de Bonchamps to arrest Msiri after negotiations broke down for Msiri's acceptance of Leopold's sovereignty, but Msiri and his men stood their ground and cocked their guns. Msiri drew a sword (a gift from Stairs), so Bodson shot him dead and was in turn mortally wounded by one of Msiri's men, his "favourite slave".

== Aftermath ==
The last words of Omer Bodson were reported to have been:

I don't mind dying now that I've killed Msiri. Thank God my death will not be in vain. I've delivered Africa from one of her most detestable tyrants.

The Stairs Expedition’s doctor, Joseph Moloney, wrote that Bodson's last words to him were the first sentence, and the second two were delivered to Captain Stairs.

Bodson was buried in Bunkeya and when Moloney returned to London in 1892 (Stairs having died on the return journey), King Leopold was still engaged in a campaign to legitimise his Congo Free State's claim to Katanga under the 1884–5 Berlin Conference's Principle of Effectivity. A justification of the killing of Msiri was required, and European written accounts of Msiri’s death, based on Stairs' official report and Moloney's writings, emphasised self-defence as the motive, claiming Msiri was a bloodthirsty tyrant. Leopold was successful in consolidating ownership of Katanga which then joined the Congo in suffering through one of the most notorious periods of colonial exploitation in African history.
