= William Grant Stairs =

Canadian-British explorer, soldier, and adventurer

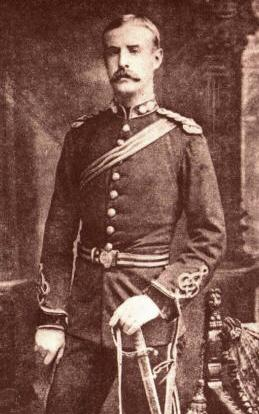
- Born: 1 July 1863; Halifax, Nova Scotia
- Died: 9 June 1892 (aged 28); Mozambique
- Relatives: William Machin Stairs (grandfather)
- Military career
- Allegiance: Canadian-British
- Rank: Captain
- Commands: Stairs Expedition to Katanga; Emin Pasha Relief Expedition
- Other work: explorer

William Grant Stairs (1 July 1863 – 9 June 1892) was a Canadian-British explorer, soldier, and adventurer who had a leading role in two expeditions during the Scramble for Africa.

== Education ==
Born in Halifax, Nova Scotia, the sixth child and third son of John Stairs and Mary Morrow, he attended school at Fort Massey Academy in Halifax, Merchiston Castle School in Edinburgh, Scotland, and the Royal Military College of Canada in Kingston, Ontario, as Student #52.

== Career ==
After graduating as a trained engineer, Stairs spent three years working for the New Zealand Trigonometrical Survey in northern New Zealand. In 1885, he accepted the offer of a commission in the British Royal Engineers and trained in Chatham, England. In 1891 he transferred to the Welsh Regiment.

=== Emin Pasha Relief Expedition ===
Captain Stairs was appointed to the Emin Pasha Relief Expedition led by Henry Morton Stanley, at the time the most celebrated living explorer of Africa. Stairs sailed from London on 20 January 1887 and met Stanley in Suez on 6 February. Their expedition started from Banana at the mouth of the Congo River on 19 March and ended in Bagamoyo, Tanzania on 5 December 1889. Stairs was appointed second-in-command after Captain Barttelot was shot on 19 July 1888.

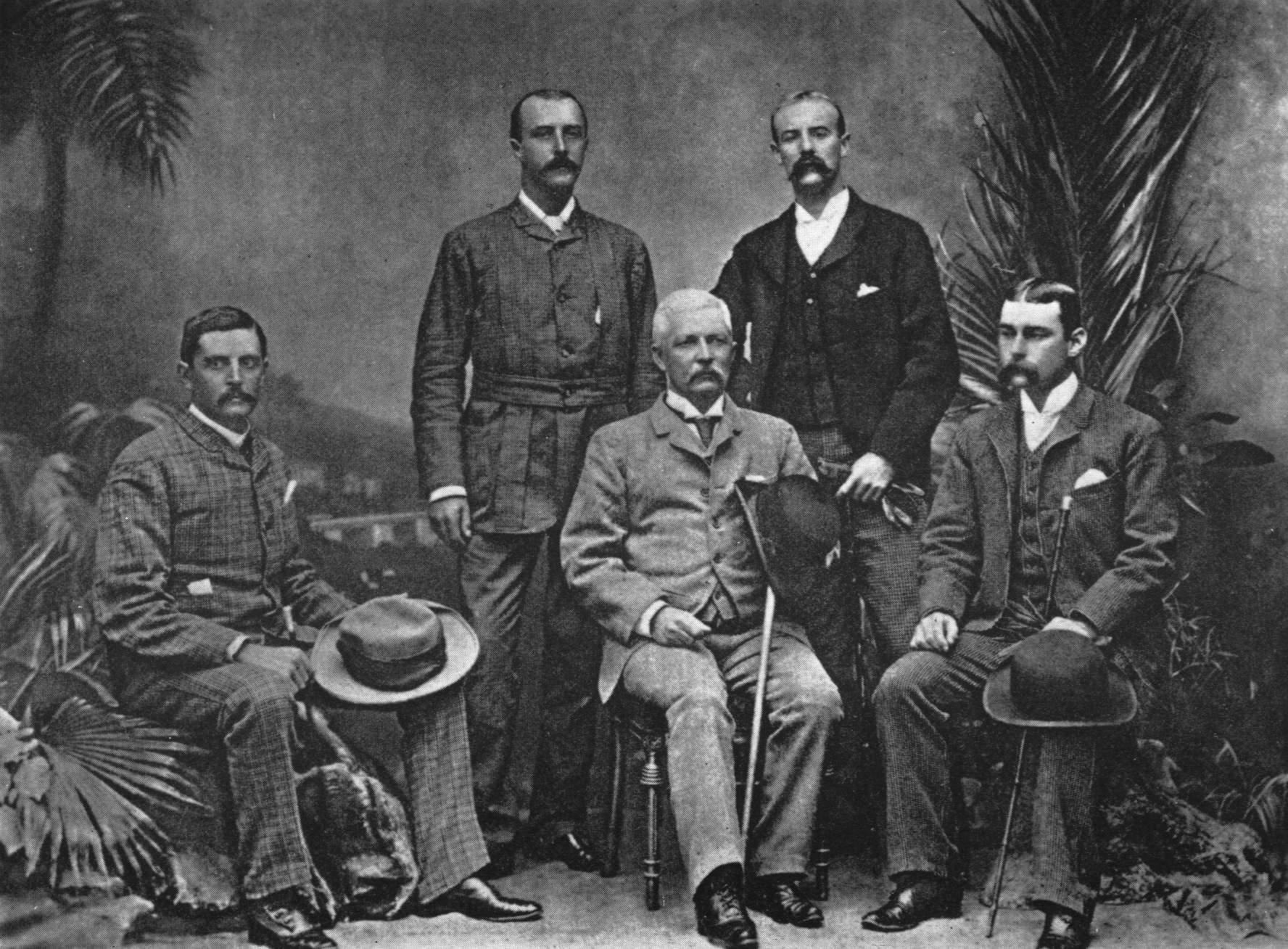
Henry M Stanley with the officers of the Advance Column, Cairo, 1890. From the left : Dr. Thomas Heazle Parke, Robert H. Nelson, Henry M. Stanley, William G. Stairs, and Arthur J. M. Jephson

During the 5000 km journey across Africa through some of its most difficult country consisting of almost impenetrable rainforest and swamps, Stairs and colleagues suffered frequently from malaria and dysentery. Stairs had endurance, toughness and perseverance. He discovered one source of the Nile, the Semliki River, and became the first non-African to ever climb in the Ruwenzoris, reaching 10,677 ft before having to turn around. He was seriously wounded in the chest by a poisonous arrow during an attack by natives. Stairs recovered from his wound to continue the journey. In Dublin, Ireland there is a bronze plaque depicting this 13 August 1887 event on the statue of expedition Surgeon Major Thomas Heazle Parke who removed the arrow and sucked the poison from the wound.

The expedition was lauded in Europe and North America for exploits seen as heroic. On his return to England Captain Stairs was named a Fellow of the Royal Geographical Society and the Royal Scottish Geographical Society in 1890.

He described the population as "unfortunate blacks who, very often, are incapable of managing their own affairs."

== The Stairs Expedition to Katanga ==
In 1891 on Stanley's recommendation, Stairs was appointed by King Leopold II of Belgium to command a mission to take Katanga also known as Garanganze with or without the consent of its powerful king, Msiri. Leopold had used Stanley's services before and agreed with his use of force and understood Stairs to be in the same mould, and he had a reputation for carrying out orders completely and without hesitation.

The Stairs Expedition was a military mission of 400 men under the Congo Free State flag, armed with 200 modern rifles. (Msiri's men had muzzle-loading muskets). Stairs ran a well-organised expedition and won the loyalty of his officers and chiefs (Zanzibari supervisors). It was smaller and lighter than his previous expedition, with only two other military officers. They were in a race against Cecil Rhodes' British South Africa Company expanding from the south, which had already sent two failed expeditions to Msiri. Stairs and Joseph Moloney, the expedition's British medical officer, were aware that they could potentially come into armed conflict with a British expedition, and agreed they would nevertheless discharge their duties to their employer, Leopold.

The Stairs Expedition became notorious for the fate of Msiri. After three days of negotiations without progress, Stairs gave Msiri an ultimatum to sign the treaty the next day, 20 December 1891. When Msiri did not appear, he sent his second-in-command, Captain Bodson to arrest Msiri, who stood his ground. Bodson shot him dead, and a fight broke out. The expedition took their wounded and Msiri's body back to their camp where Stairs was waiting, and there they cut off Msiri's head and hoisted it on a pole in plain view as a 'barbaric lesson' to his people. Some of the Garanganze were massacred by the expedition's askaris, and most of the rest fled into the bush.

Stairs handed over Msiri's body to his two brothers and an adopted son, Makanda Bantu, whom Stairs installed as chief to replace Msiri, and who signed the treaty acknowledging Leopold as sovereign. The two brothers refused to do so until Stairs sent Moloney to threaten them with the same fate as Msiri.

Oral histories of the Garanganze people say that the expedition kept Msiri's head – by some accounts in a can of kerosene – but it cursed and killed everyone who carried it and eventually, this included Stairs. He was ill with malaria throughout January 1892. After being relieved by another expedition, the Stairs Expedition set out on the long return journey to Zanzibar. Stairs was frequently sick but by May 1892 had recovered. On a steamer down the lower Zambezi he had another attack of malaria which killed him on 9 June 1892. He is buried in the European Cemetery in Chinde, Mozambique at the mouth of the Zambezi River.

Only 189 of the 400 men on the expedition made it back to Zanzibar, a year after they had left, most of the rest died and few deserted. Katanga became part of the Congo Free State, which was annexed by Belgium in 1908 after an international outcry over the killings, brutality and slavery by Leopold's regime. In the early 20th century as Katanga's mining industries developed, some British in Northern Rhodesia, representing the losers in the scramble for Katanga, thought of Stairs as a mercenary and traitor to the British Empire.

== Commemoration ==
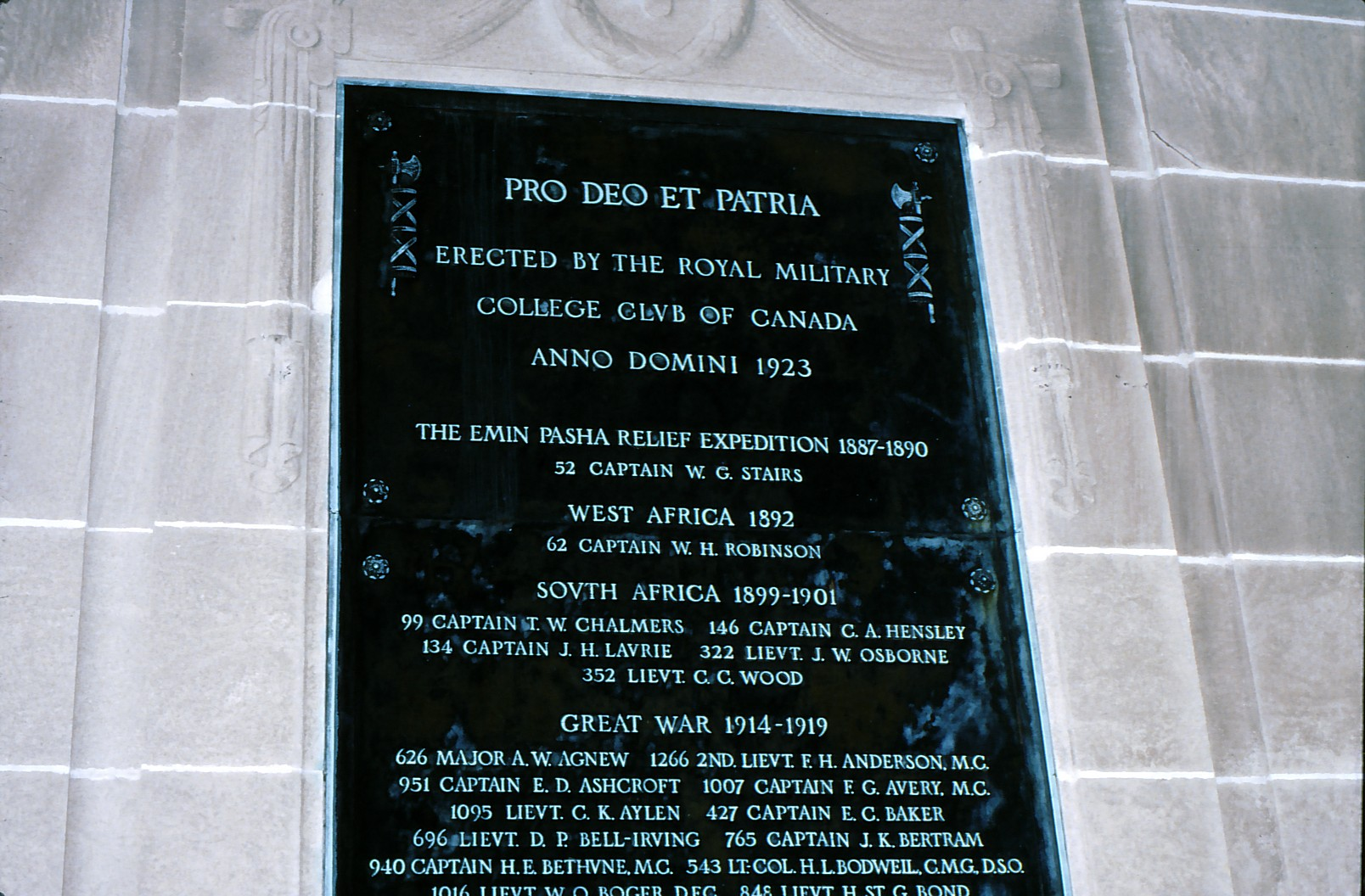
Royal Military College memorial

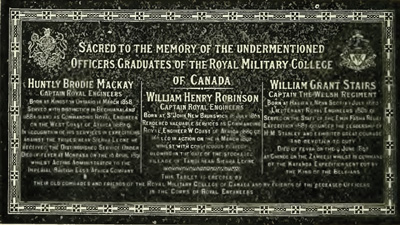
pre WWI memorial plaque dedicated to Royal Military College of Canada ex-cadets William Grant Stairs, Huntly Brodie Mackay, and William Henry Robinson

Captain Stairs is commemorated with three identical tablets (c. 1902) in the vestibule of Mackenzie Building at Royal Military College of Canada, St. George's Cathedral (Kingston, Ontario) and in Rochester Cathedral near Chatham, England.

- "William Grant Stairs, Captain the Welsh Regiment. Born at Halifax Nova Scotia 1 July 1863. Lieutenant Royal Engineers 1885–91. Served on the staff of the Emin Pasha Relief Expedition 1887 under the leadership of H.M. Stanley and exhibited great courage and devotion to duty. Died of fever on 9 June 1892 at Chinde on the Zambesi whilst in command of the Katanga Expedition sent out by the King of the Belgians."
- A tablet at the Royal Military College of Canada Memorial Arch erected in 1932 "The Emin Pasha Relief Expedition 1887–1890 52 Captain W.G. Stairs"

A collection of artefacts from his African expeditions are at Fort Frederick (Kingston) and some his diaries are preserved in the Public Archives of Nova Scotia; others are lost.

Stairs Island, Parry Sound, Ontario was named in his honour.

Both Stairs Street and Stairs Place in Halifax, Nova Scotia, bear his name.

== See also ==
- Military history of Nova Scotia
- Clonard Keating
