= History of Africa =

Archaic humans emerged out of Africa between 0.5 and 1.8 million years ago. This was followed by the emergence of modern humans (Homo sapiens) in East Africa around 300,000–250,000 years ago who spread across the world. The oral word is revered in most African cultures, and history has predominantly been passed down through oral tradition. In the 4th and 3rd millennia BCE Ancient Egypt and Kerma arose in the northeast, while the Tichitt Tradition flourished in West Africa. Between around 3000 BCE and 500 CE, the Bantu expansion swept from north-western Central Africa (modern day Cameroon) across much of Central, Eastern, and Southern Africa, displacing or absorbing groups such as the Khoisan and Pygmies.

Some societies were heterarchical and egalitarian, while others organised into chiefdoms. (Note: In stateless societies, oral histories centred around clan histories. John Lonsdale famously said that "the most distinctively African contribution to human history could be said to have been precisely the civilized art of living fairly peaceably together not in states".) At its peak it is estimated that Africa had around 10,000 polities, with most following traditional religions. The continent has seen the rise and fall of many states, (Note: Most states were created through conquest or the borrowing and assimilation of ideas and institutions, while others developed largely in isolation.) and there have long been extensive trading networks between its regions. Some African empires and kingdoms include:

- Kush, Carthage, Numidia, Masuna, Makuria, the Fatimids, Almoravids, Almohads, Ayyubids, Mamluks, Marinids, Zayyanids and Hafsids in North Africa;
- Wagadu, Mali, Songhai, Jolof, Ife, Oyo, Benin, Bonoman, Dagbon, Nri, Ségou, Asante, Fante, Massina, Sokoto, Tukulor, and Wassoulou in West Africa;
- dʿmt, Aksum, Ethiopia, Damot, Ifat, Adal, Ajuran, Darfur, Funj, Kitara, Kilwa, Sakalava, Imerina, Kibosho, Bunyoro, Buganda, and Rwanda in East Africa;
- Kanem-Bornu, Kongo, Anziku, Loango, Ndongo, Mwene Muji, Kotoko, Wadai, Mbunda, Luba, Lunda, Kuba, and Utetera in Central Africa; and
- Mapungubwe, Great Zimbabwe, Mutapa, Butua, Rozvi, Maravi, Oukwanyama, Lozi, Lobedu, Mthwakazi, and amaZulu in Southern Africa.

From the 7th century CE, Islam spread west amid the Arab conquest of North Africa, and by proselytization to the Horn of Africa, bringing with it a new social system. It later spread southwards to the Swahili coast assisted by Muslim dominance of the Indian Ocean trade, and across the Sahara into the western Sahel and Sudan, catalysed by the Fula jihads of the 18th and 19th centuries. When the trans-Saharan, Red Sea, Indian Ocean and Atlantic long-distance slave trades began, local slave systems started supplying captives for markets outside Africa. This reorientated many African economies, and created various diasporas, especially in the Americas.

Between 1870 and 1914, driven by the Second Industrial Revolution European colonisation of Africa grew rapidly in the "Scramble for Africa", and saw the major European powers partition the continent at the 1884 Berlin Conference, resulting in territory under European imperial control increasing from one-tenth of the continent to over nine-tenths. European colonialism had significant impacts on Africa's societies, and colonies were maintained for the purpose of economic exploitation of human and natural resources. Though Christianity has had a long history in Africa, widespread conversions occurred under European rule in southern West Africa, Central Africa, and Southern Africa due to successful missions, and the syncretization of Christianity with local beliefs.

The rise of nationalism gave birth to independence movements in many parts of the continent, and with a weakened Europe after the Second World War, a wave of decolonisation took place, culminating in the 1960 Year of Africa and the establishment of the Organisation of African Unity in 1963 (the predecessor to the African Union), with countries deciding to keep their colonial borders. Traditional power structures, which had been incorporated into the colonial administration, remained partly in place in many parts of Africa, and their roles, powers, and influence vary greatly. Many countries have experienced the rise and fall of nationalism, and continue to face challenges such as internal conflict, neocolonialism, and climate change.

== History in Africa ==
The oral word is revered in most African cultures, and history has predominantly been passed down through oral tradition. (Note: Jan Vansina differentiated between "oral civilisations" and "literate civilisations", wherein the former prides the oral word over the written word and vice versa. This characterisation has come under criticism by some African scholars, as it implies conflict between the oral and written. They instead contend that in reality, the situation is defined by the interaction between three ways of expression and diffusion: the oral, the written, and the printed word. Bethwell Allan Ogot notes that images of Africa composed by Western writers have often been in terms of "opposites" and how they differ from an "us".) In accordance with African cosmology, African historical consciousness viewed historical change and continuity, order and purpose within the framework of a person and their environment, the gods, and their ancestors, who believed themselves to be part of a holistic spiritual entity. In African societies, the historical process is largely a communal one, with eyewitness accounts, hearsay, reminiscences, and occasionally visions, dreams, and hallucinations crafted into narrative oral traditions which are performed and transmitted through generations. In oral traditions time is sometimes mythical and social, and ancestors were considered historical actors. (Note: In these cases, time's duration is not as it affects the fate of the individual, but the pulse of the social group. It is not a river flowing in one direction from a known source to a known outlet. Generally, traditional African time involves eternity in both directions, unlike Christians who consider eternity to operate in one direction. In African animism, time is an arena where both the group and the individual struggle for their vitality. The goal is to improve their situation, thus being dynamic. Bygone generations remain contemporary, and as influential as they were during their lifetime, if not more so. In these circumstances causality operates in a forward direction from past to present and from present to future, however direct intervention can operate in any direction.) Mind and memory shapes traditions, as events are condensed over time and crystallise into clichés. Historian and anthropologist Jan Vansina said that interpretation requires a proficient (or better yet native) understanding of the language and culture. Oral tradition can be exoteric or esoteric. Philosopher Anselm Jimoh wrote that in African epistemology, the epistemic subject "experiences the epistemic object in a sensuous, emotive, intuitive, abstractive understanding, rather than through abstraction alone, as is the case in Western epistemology" to arrive at a "complete knowledge", and as such oral traditions, music, proverbs, and the like were used in the preservation and transmission of knowledge.

== Prehistory ==
Africa is considered by most paleoanthropologists to be the oldest inhabited territory on Earth, with the Human species originating from the continent. During the mid-20th century, anthropologists discovered many fossils and evidence of human occupation perhaps as early as seven million years ago ("Before Present"; BP). Fossil remains of several species of early apelike humans thought to have evolved into modern humans, such as Australopithecus afarensis radiometrically dated to approximately 3.9–3.0 million years BP, Paranthropus boisei (c. 2.3–1.4 million years BP) and Homo ergaster (c. 1.9 million–600,000 years BP) have been discovered.

After the evolution of Homo sapiens approximately 350,000 to 260,000 years BP in Africa, the continent was mainly populated by groups of hunter-gatherers. These first modern humans left Africa and populated the rest of the globe during the Out of Africa II migration dated to approximately 50,000 years BP, exiting the continent either across Bab-el-Mandeb over the Red Sea, the Strait of Gibraltar in Morocco, or the Isthmus of Suez in Egypt.

Other migrations of modern humans within the African continent have been dated to that time, with evidence of early human settlement found in Southern Africa, Southeast Africa, North Africa, and the Sahara. At the end of the Ice ages, estimated to have been around 10,500 BCE, the Sahara had again become a green fertile valley, and its African populations returned from the interior and coastal highlands in Africa, with rock art paintings depicting a fertile Sahara and large populations discovered in Tassili n'Ajjer dating back perhaps 10 millennia. However, the warming and drying climate meant that by 5000 BCE, the Sahara region was becoming increasingly dry and hostile. Around 3500 BCE, due to a tilt in the Earth's orbit, the Sahara experienced a period of rapid desertification. The domestication of cattle in Africa preceded agriculture and seems to have existed alongside hunter-gatherer cultures. It is speculated that by 6000 BCE, cattle were domesticated in North Africa.

In West Africa, a wet phase ushered in an expanding rainforest and wooded savanna from Senegal to Cameroon. Between 9000 and 5000 BCE, Niger–Congo speakers domesticated the oil palm and raffia palm. Black-eyed peas and voandzeia (African groundnuts), were domesticated, followed by okra and kola nuts. Since most of the plants grew in the forest, the Niger–Congo speakers invented polished stone axes for clearing forest. Pygmies have inhabited Central Africa for many millennia, likely splitting into eastern and western groups around 5000 BP. Over 150,000 BP, there was an early dispersal of anatomically modern humans to Eastern and Southern Africa, equated with the modern-day Khoekhoe and San, the latter of whom have preserved their traditional hunter-gatherer way of life. (Note: Some scholars contest that cultures and identities cannot be considered fixed or invariable, especially over such a long time period.)

== c. 4000 BCE – c. 600 CE ==
=== Northeast Africa ===
Map of Ancient Egypt, showing its major cities and sites, c. 3150 BC to 30 BC

During the 4th millennium BCE, settled agro-pastoralist populations along the Nile transitioned to ranked societies, legitimised by local belief systems. From around 3500 BCE, nomes (ruled by nomarchs) competed and expanded, with one centred in Abydos coming to rule Upper Egypt. Around 3100 BCE Upper Egypt conquered Lower Egypt to unify the region under the 1st dynasty, with the process of consolidation and assimilation completed by the time of the 3rd dynasty who formed the Old Kingdom of Egypt in 2686 BCE. The Kingdom of Kerma emerged around this time to become the dominant force in Nubia, controlling territory as large as Egypt between the 1st and 4th cataracts of the Nile. The height of the Old Kingdom saw the construction of many great pyramids, though under the 6th dynasty power gradually decentralised to the nomarchs, culminating in the disintegration of the kingdom, exacerbated by drought and famine. Around 2055 BCE, the 11th dynasty, based in Thebes, conquered the others to form the Middle Kingdom of Egypt, and the 12th dynasty expanded into Lower Nubia at the expense of Kerma. Around 1700 BCE, the Middle Kingdom fractured in two, and the Hyksos (a militaristic people from Palestine) invaded and conquered Lower Egypt, while Kerma coordinated invasions deep into Egypt to reach its greatest extent. In 1550 BCE, the 18th dynasty expelled the Hyksos, and established the New Kingdom of Egypt. The New Kingdom conquered the Levant from the Canaanites, Mittani, Amorites, and Hittites, and extinguished Kerma, incorporating Nubia into the empire and sending the Egyptian empire into its golden age. Internal struggles, drought, famine, and invasions by a confederation of seafaring peoples contributed to the New Kingdom's collapse in 1069 BCE.

Egypt's collapse liberated the Kingdom of Kush in Nubia, which manoeuvred into power in Upper Egypt and conquered Lower Egypt in 754 BCE to form the Kushite Empire. The Kushites ruled for a century and oversaw a revival in pyramid building, until they were driven out of Egypt by the Assyrians in 663 BCE. The Assyrians installed a puppet dynasty that later gained independence and once more unified Egypt, until they were conquered by the Achaemenid Empire in 525 BCE. Egypt briefly regained independence from the Achaemenids under the 28th dynasty from 404 to 343 BCE. The conquest of Achaemenid Egypt by Alexander the Great in 332 BCE marked the beginning of Hellenistic rule and the installation of the Macedonian Ptolemaic dynasty in Egypt. The Ptolemaics lost their holdings outside of Africa to the Seleucids in the Syrian Wars, expanded into Cyrenaica, and briefly occupied part of Kush in the 3rd century BCE. In the 1st century BCE, Ptolemaic Egypt became entangled in a Roman civil war, leading to its conquest by the Romans in 30 BCE. Kush persisted as a major regional power until, having been weakened from internal rebellion amid worsening climatic conditions, it disintegrated amid invasions by Aksum and the Noba into Makuria, Alodia, and Nobatia around the 5th century CE.

=== Horn of Africa ===
In the Horn of Africa, there was the Land of Punt, a kingdom thought to have been on the Red Sea which was a close trading partner of Ancient Egypt in the 3rd and 2nd millennia BCE. Rodolfo Fattovich equated it to the Gash Group in the Sudanese-Eritrean lowlands, and some scholars have hypothesised modern-day Somaliland, though Kenneth Kitchen and Felix Chami locate it on Zanzibar Island. In the Eritrean-Ethiopian Highlands, the kingdom of dʿmt rose c. 980 BCE as the region was incorporated into global trading networks, and it exhibited Sabaean influences which most scholars attribute to a small migration of Sabaeans and their assimilation. Several scholars consider there to have been other contemporaneous states, and dʿmt's collapse in the mid-1st century BCE saw the region inhabited by small polities. Modern-day Somalia was inhabited by nomadic pastoralists, and along the Horn's coast there were many ancient Somali city-states that thrived off of the wider Red Sea trade, and enjoyed a lucrative monopoly on cinnamon from Ancient India due to their freedom from Roman interference. In the 1st century CE, the Kingdom of Aksum rose from a city-state to rule much of the northern Ethiopian-Eritrean Highlands and the Red Sea port of Adulis. Aksum was described as one of the four great powers by Persian prophet Mani in the 3rd century. Aksum's king converted from traditional religion to Christianity in the 4th century, gradually followed by the population. In the 6th century, Aksum conquered South Arabia, though struggled to maintain control over it, and began to gradually lose its dominance over Red Sea trade to Persians and Arabians.

=== Northwest Africa ===
Northwest Africa (the Maghreb) was inhabited by Berber semi-nomadic pastoralists. In the 1st millennium BCE, Phoenician migration and settlement came in search for precious metals in the Gulf of Tunis. This grew into Ancient Carthage after gaining independence from Phoenicia in the 6th century BCE, and they built an extensive trading empire with a strict mercantile network. Carthage's collapse and conquest by Rome in the Punic Wars (3rd and 2nd centuries BCE) saw Numidia and Mauretania become major powers in the Maghreb. Towards the end of the 2nd century BCE Mauretania fought alongside Numidia's Jugurtha against the Romans in the Jugurthine War after he had usurped the Numidian throne from a Roman ally. Together they inflicted heavy casualties, with the war only ending inconclusively when Mauretania's Bocchus I sold out Jugurtha to the Romans. Around the turn of the millennium, both came under direct Roman rule. While traditional religion predominated among Berbers, some people converted to Christianity. In the 5th century CE the Vandals conquered Roman Africa followed by the fall of Rome, though the province was reconquered by the Byzantines a century later. Large swathes of indigenous peoples regained self-governance in Masuna and its numerous successor polities in the Maghreb, including the kingdoms of Ouarsenis, Aurès, and Altava.

=== West Africa ===
In the western Sahel the rise of settled communities occurred largely as a result of the domestication of millet and of sorghum, and cattle pastoralism began c. 2500 BCE. Extensive east-west belts of deserts, grasslands, and forests from north to south were adapted to by their respective societies and meant that symbiotic trade relations developed in response to the differing environments. Beginning around 4000 BCE, the Tichitt culture in modern-day Mauritania and Mali is the oldest known complexly organised society in West Africa, while others included the Kintampo culture in modern-day Ghana, the Nok culture in modern-day Nigeria, and the Daima culture around Lake Chad. Towards the end of the 3rd century CE, a wet period in the Sahel created areas for human habitation and exploitation that had not been habitable for the best part of a millennium. The Ghana Empire (also called Wagadu) rose out of the Tichitt culture. It grew wealthy following the introduction of the camel to the western Sahel, which revolutionised the trans-Saharan trade that linked their capital and Aoudaghost with Tahert and Sijilmasa in North Africa. Soninke tradition holds that the final founding of Wagadu occurred after Dinga did a deal with Bida (a serpent deity who was guarding a well) to sacrifice one maiden annually in exchange for assurance regarding plenty of rainfall and gold supply. (Note: Bida is stressed as a protective force by narrators; some versions have Bida descending from Dinga, with Dinga's children founding Wagadu. Pythons are most at home in grasslands near water, and likely came to be associated with the seasonal rains, with them rarely being seen during the dry periods. As such, snake deities feature prominently in West African traditional religions.) Based on large tumuli scattered across West Africa dating to this period, several scholars have speculated that there were further simultaneous and preceding states relative to Wagadu.

=== Central, Eastern, and Southern Africa ===
In the Grasslands of northwestern Cameroon, Bantu-speaking agriculturalists started to gradually migrate south sometime between 5000 and 3000 BCE. Despite intensive research, the cause of the migrations, and that of the directions taken, is still unclear, (Note: An initial idea that the dispersal was caused by population pressure following the introduction of farming is generally now discounted.) however there is consensus that there were multiple dispersal events. Around 1500 BCE, Bantu speakers reached central Cameroon. The 'Western Stream' likely followed the coast and the major rivers of the Congo system southwards to reach the southern fringe of the Congolian Rainforest around 500 BCE (some may have used the sea to circumvent the rainforest). Their arrival coincided with the spread of iron metallurgy through Central Africa. Meanwhile, the 'Eastern Stream' travelled either the northern fringe of the rainforest or the Ubangi River eastwards, and reached just west of Lake Victoria around 500 BCE. While there, Bantu speakers adopted iron metallurgy from Cushitic speakers (who had settled East Africa in the 3rd millennium BCE), and coexisted with them. Dispersal from the Great Lakes region occurred in two more streams: one went west to meet the Western Stream in DR Congo and Angola, while the other went south and spread across Eastern and Southern Africa. Around the turn of the millennium, Bantu speakers reached central modern-day Tanzania and the east coast, before rapidly moving southwards along the coast to reach modern-day Kwazulu Natal in South Africa around the 3rd century CE. Throughout this, Bantu speakers displaced, replaced, or intermarried with and absorbed hunter-gatherer, pastoralist, and agriculturalist groups.

== c. 600 – c. 1800 ==
=== North Africa ===
In the 7th century, as part of the Arab conquests which sought to spread Islamic rule, the Rashidun Caliphate scored crucial military victories against the Byzantine Empire and expanded rapidly, conquering Egypt and the Exarchate from them in the 640s. After a brief civil war, the Rashiduns were supplanted by the Umayyads, who, after stiff resistance from Berber leaders such as Kusaila and Kahina, had conquered the Maghreb by the early-8th century. Large numbers of Berber and Coptic people willingly converted to Islam, and followers of Abrahamic religions ('People of the Book') were protected, though followers of traditional Berber religion were violently oppressed and often given the ultimatum to convert to Islam or face captivity or enslavement. In the 8th century the Berber Revolt rocked the Caliphate and Berber dynasties took control over the Maghreb, while the Bashmurian revolts ensued in Egypt.

The Tulunids briefly ruled an independent Egypt in the 9th century. In the 10th century, the Fatimids rose to power in modern-day Tunisia, established a rival caliphate, and conquered Egypt, where Cairo was built to serve as the capital of the caliphate and a hub for the Islamic world, before their influence expanded to encompass the Middle East. In the 11th century, the Fatimids started to collapse amidst Turkish and Crusader expansion; Saladin, a Fatimid vizier, usurped power in the 12th century and established the Ayyubid dynasty which restored Egyptian prestige. Meanwhile the zealous Almoravids conquered the Maghreb and intervened in the Christian reconquest of Iberia. The Almohad revolution later deposed the Almoravids. After Christian gains in Iberia in the 13th century, the Almohads disintegrated into the Marinids, Zayyanids, and Hafsids in modern-day Morocco, Algeria, and Tunisia respectively. The Mamluk Sultanate of Egypt was one of the wealthiest and most powerful empires in the Islamic golden age. Its army controlled the Levant and the Hejaz, driving out the last Crusaders. This century saw the end of the major Mongol expansion in the Middle East, culminating in a lasting peace treaty in 1323 between the Egyptian Sultanate and the Ilkhanate. In the early-16th century, the Ottoman Empire rapidly conquered North Africa (save for Morocco, now under Saadi rule) to counter Spanish expansionism. (Note: During the 15th century, the Spanish conquered the Canary Islands, and deported or enslaved the indigenous Berber population (Guanches), forcing them to work on plantations. Combined with mass killings and disease, this caused the annihilation of the Guanches. There is scholarly debate about whether it constituted genocide, and it served as a blueprint for European colonialism in the Americas.) In the following centuries, over a million Europeans are estimated to have been captured and enslaved by Barbary corsairs. The Ottoman regencies became more independent during the 18th century.

=== Western Sahel and Sudan ===
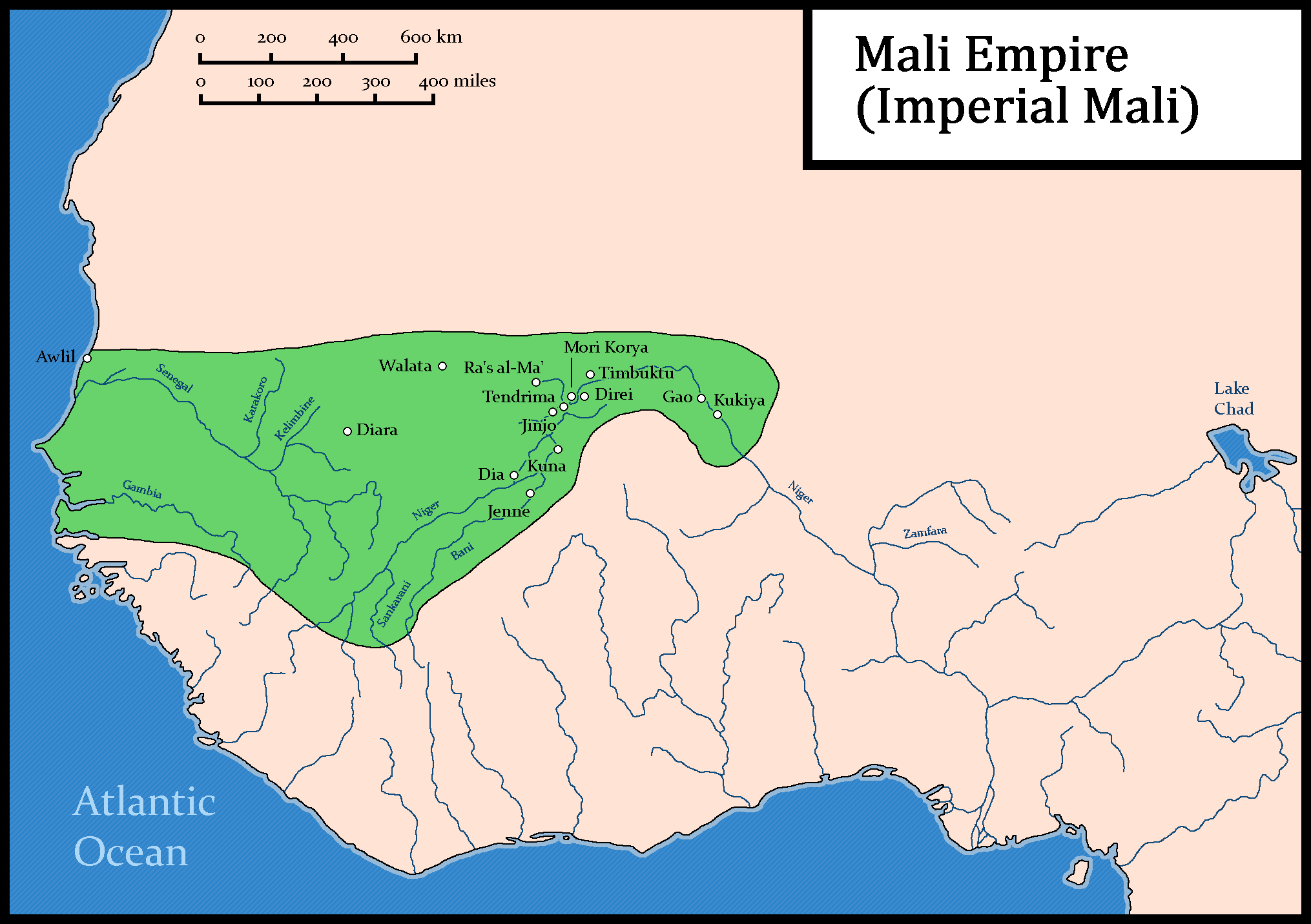
Territory of the Mali Empire

Wagadu was the most powerful of a constellation of states stretching from Takrur on the Senegal River Valley to Mema in the Niger Valley, all of whom were subservient to Wagadu at least some of the time. The Gao Empire was situated to the east of Wagadu, and controlled the salt trade. Islam had reached Gao and Takrur by the 11th century, during which the Almoravids (before their conquests north) captured Wagadu's royal seat of Aoudaghost, gaining the king's conversion, and several vassals broke free. (Note: Soninke oral traditions hold that, intent on invading Ghana, the Almoravid army found the king respectful of Islam, and that he willingly adopted Islam with the exchange of gold for an imam relocating to Koumbi Saleh.) Despite Wagadu regaining full independence and power throughout the 12th century, this could not counteract the worsening climate and shifts in trade south and east, leading to its conquest by its former vassal Sosso c. 1200, propelling Soninke migration. (Note: According to some traditions, Wagadu's fall is caused when a nobleman attempts to save a maiden from sacrifice against her wishes and kills Bida before escaping the population's ire on horseback, annulling Wagadu and Bida's prior assurance and unleashing a curse causing drought and famine, sometimes causing gold to be discovered in Bure (Wagadu had derived its gold from Bambouk). The Soninke generation that survived the drought were called "it has been hard for them" (a jara nununa).) In the face of Sosso aggression, Sundiata Keita united the Mandinka clans and conquered Sosso and Gao, expanding across the western Sahel and Sudan to found the Mali Empire. Mali grew fabulously rich through controlling the trans-Saharan trade. During the 14th and 15th centuries Mali experienced political instability and lost control over the Jolof Empire in Senegambia, and Sahelian trading centres to the nomadic Tuareg. (Note: As Mali collapsed, an Islamic doctrine formulated by Al-Hajj Salim Suwari became popular among Muslims in West Africa. It called for peaceful coexistence between Muslims and non-believers and religious tolerance. Historian Emily Osborn wrote that "central to Suwari’s teachings is the idea that God, not human beings, is responsible for designing and timing conversion to Islam. Suwarians consequently do not proselytize their faith to non-Muslims, and they reject militant jihad as a means to promote religious conversion.") Under Sonni Ali, Gao swept through the crumbling empire, fending off the Mossi kingdom of Yatenga and forming the Songhai Empire. Weakened by internal conflict, in 1591 Gao was conquered by Morocco; the political vacuum came to be filled by the Segou Empire and several other states. The once lucrative trans-Saharan trade gradually lost its prominence to the coastal Atlantic trade with Europeans, and the following centuries saw many droughts, famines, and epidemics in the region.

=== Central and Eastern Sahel and Sudan ===
Located around Lake Chad, the founding of the Kanem Empire is typically dated to c. 700, and it greatly benefited from serving as a crossroad for east–west and north–south Saharan trade, growing to encompass several peoples. Facilitated by contact with Muslim traders or nomadic Tubu, in the 11th century the Duguwa dynasty converted to Ibadi Islam, (Note: The empire is generally regarded to have been founded by the Zaghawa people, to whom Arabic sources connect the Duguwa dynasty. The local traditional religion greatly privileged the status of rulers, who were believed to possess supernatural powers, and they had unlimited authority.) before they were usurped by the Sunni and Kanembu Sayfawa dynasty. Under the Sayfawa, Kanem became a centre of Islamic scholarship, and extended its rule to the Kaouar and Fezzan oases, gaining even greater control over trans-Saharan trade. In Nubia, having converted to Christianity, Makuria annexed Nobatia, and halted Muslim expansion during the 7th century, with whom it signed a peace treaty. Over the following centuries Makuria defended the Coptic Patriarch of Alexandria in Muslim-controlled Egypt, and entered into a dynastic or political union with Alodia during the 10th century. A warm period in the 14th century caused Lake Chad to dry up, and Kanem became engrossed in conflict with the Tubu and Bilala; Kanem's capital was captured by the Bilala, forcing the leadership and other Kanembu to move to Bornu. Meanwhile, Islam spread through Hausaland; in the 15th century a deposed Bornu ruler fled to Kano, leading Bornu to vassalise several Hausa kingdoms. (Note: Hausa tradition describes the division of roles between the states, where Kano and Rano were centres of the textile industry (and thus called sarakuman babba; "kings of indigo"), Katsina and Daura were trade centres (called sarakuman kasuwa; "kings of the market"), Zazzau supplied slave labour to the other states (called sarkin bayi; "king of the slaves"), and Gobir, as the northernmost city, was tasked with the defence of Hausaland from foreign invaders (called sarkin yaki; "king of war").) Bornu also conquered Kotoko (which had grown out of the Sao civilisation), reaching the height of its power. In Hausaland the 16th century saw the rise of Kebbi which countered Bornu influence, while Amina's Zazzau expanded south. In Nubia, following Mamluk aggression, the plague, and the migration of Bedouin tribes to the region, Makuria and Alodia gradually collapsed and disintegrated; the Funj Sultanate came to rule the Sudan, and blocked Turco-Egyptian expansion south. To the west in modern-day Darfur and eastern Chad, following the successive Daju and Tunjur kingdoms, the 17th century saw the rise of the Bagirmi, Wadai, and Darfur sultanates, (Note: The region was very ethnically diverse, and for the Keira dynasty of Darfur it was common to intermarry with other ethnic groups, such that the royal family was open to integrating strangers into the elite. Over the course of its existence, the expansion of the state was often done via integration and assimilation rather than by war.) and frequent slave-raiding of populations to their south. Bornu entered into decline as it experienced droughts and lost control of trans-Saharan trade to the nomadic Tuareg and Ottomans.

=== Horn of Africa ===
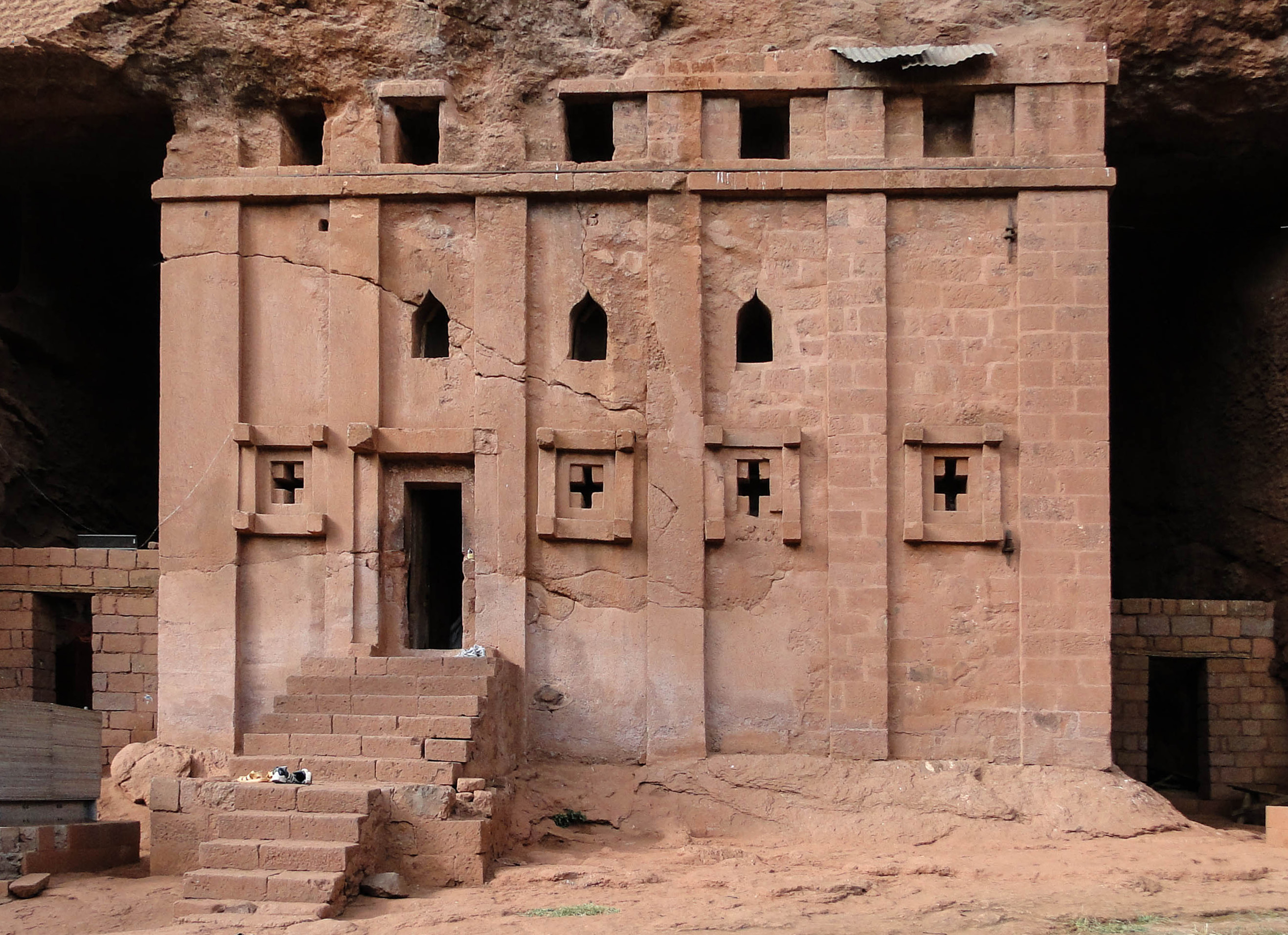
One of the Rock-Hewn Churches of Lalibela, constructed during the Zagwe dynasty

Following the birth of Islam in the early-7th century, nomadic Somalis began to convert to Islam, and it spread through the eastern Horn via daʿwah. Though Muslim-Aksumite relations were initially friendly, they soon soured. Aksum lost control of the Red Sea, and its isolation from Christendom caused Ethiopian society to introspect and take inspiration from the Old Testament. Islamised Beja invaded the Ethiopian Highlands, forcing Aksum to migrate south, where, according to tradition, Aksum's expansion was met by a Jewish or traditionalist queen who destroyed the state c. 960. From the 11th century, the growing Somalian population expanded across the eastern Horn, with Islam key to the assimilation of other groups. During the 13th century, hegemony in the Horn was contested by the Christian Zagwe, the Muslims of Shewa, and the traditionalist Damot, while the Ajuran Sultanate ruled the southern Somali clans on the coast. In the late-13th century, the Solomonic dynasty overthrew the Zagwe to found the Ethiopian Empire, while Shewa was replaced by Ifat. Soon after, Ethiopia conquered Damot and the Muslim states, entering into a 'golden age'. In the 16th century Muslims united behind Adal in jihad to reconquer the Muslim lands and occupy Ethiopia, until, with Portuguese assistance, Ethiopia counter-attacked and its sovereignty was restored in a reduced state. The 16th and 17th centuries also saw Oromo invasions into the Horn, weakening Ethiopia further and causing the collapse of Adal, while Ajuran also disintegrated. Ethiopia briefly consolidated its authority in the late-17th century, though the turn of the century saw fragmentation and gradually-increasing anarchy, which continued throughout the 18th century.

=== Western Congo Basin ===
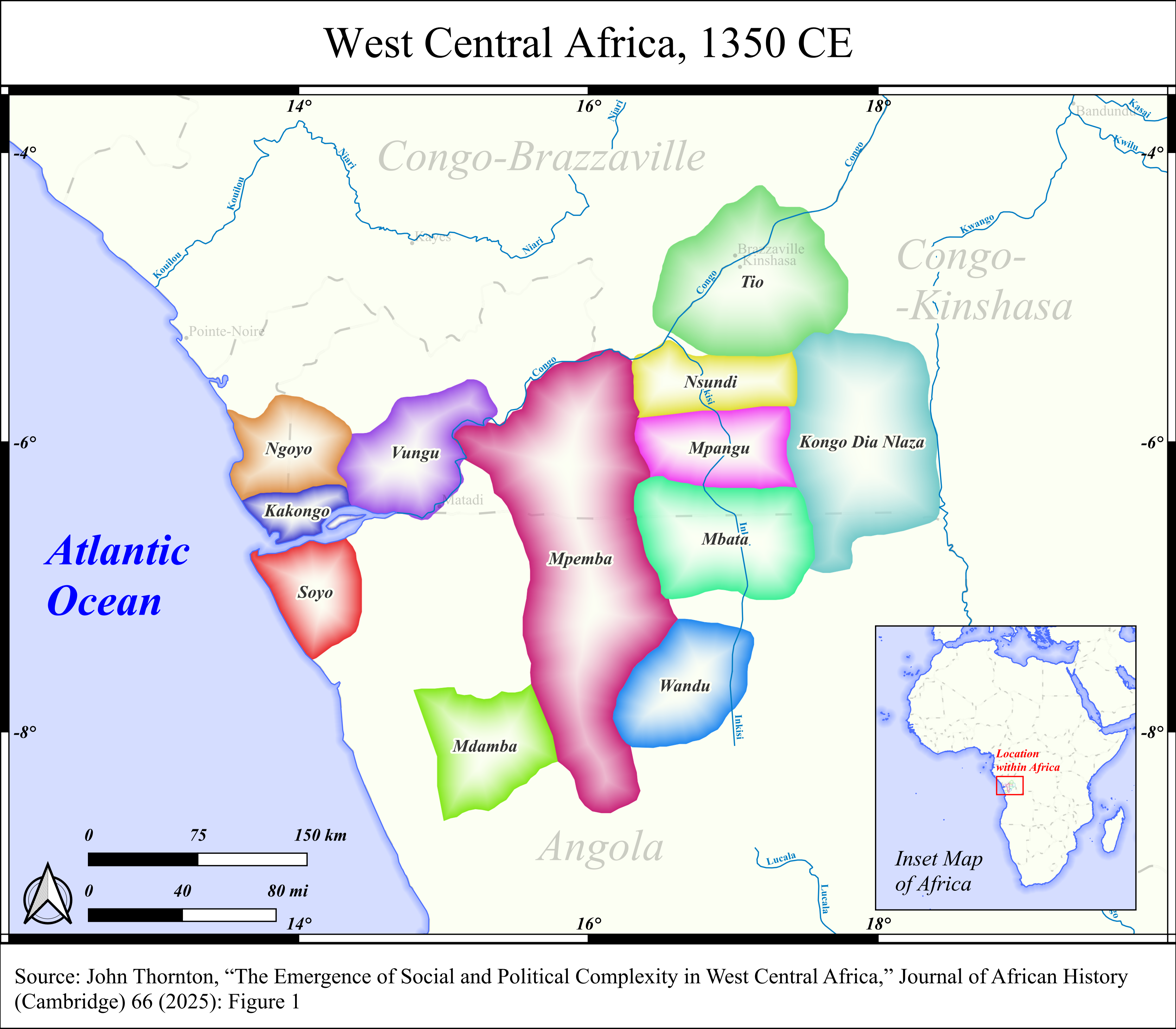
States of the western Congo Basin, c. 1350

In the western Congo Basin, a period of state and class formation began circa 700 with three centres: one in the west around Pool Malebo, one south around the highlands of Angola, and a third north-central around Lake Mai-Ndombe. By the 13th century there were three main federations of states in the western Congo Basin around Pool Malebo: the Seven Kingdoms, Mpemba, and one led by Vungu. Kongo traditions detail the founding and rapid expansion of the Kingdom of Kongo in the late-14th and early-15th centuries by Lukeni lua Nimi, (Note: Before Lukeni Lua Nimi's reign, traditions say that the first king crossed the Congo River from Vungu to conquer Mpemba Kasi (constituent of Mpemba), and ruled from Nsi a Kwilu (an old religious centre strategically located for trade). The first king is given as Ntinu Wene (lit. '"King of the Kingdom"'), and Mpemba Kasi is described as the "Mother of Kongo". John Thornton wrote that the choice of a title over a personal name indicates that this is more representative of symbolic relationships and rights of rulership rather than historical events.) though it was checked by the Tio Kingdom to its north (which saw Mwene Muji around Lake Mai-Ndombe to its northeast). In the late-15th century the Portuguese established relations with Kongo, whose ruler converted to Catholicism (eventually syncretising traditional beliefs). Atlantic trade began, with slaves being the most lucrative export. (Note: Kongo forcibly moved some populations (mubika) to be nearer densely-populated areas, making their surplus (ie. non-subsistent) economic output more readily available. They also became soldiers, servants, and government officials. It was the mubika who were first sold to European traders as captives, thus enslaved and forced to carry out closely-supervised intensive labour on far-away plantations.) In the 16th century, Afonso I's conquests produced many captives for Kongo's monopoly, and the slave trade rapidly grew to meet demand in the Americas. By the mid-16th century, the Kingdom of Loango had formed north of the Congo River, and to the south Ndongo had broken free from Kongo and entered commercial relations with the Portuguese. (Note: Kimbundu traditions recorded in the 17th century held that the first Ngola (king) was a blacksmith who had arrived from Kongo, and was "elected king because of his benevolence".) In the late-16th century, as a concession for helping to expel Yaka invasions (from Mwene Muji), Kongo allowed the Portuguese to establish a colony at Luanda, which expanded and became Portuguese Angola. Over the course of the late-16th and 17th centuries, the Portuguese sought to conquer Ndongo (allied to Matamba) in the Angolan Wars; (Note: The number of slaves exported from Portuguese Angola increased from 5000 annually in the 1590s (half of the total number of Africans exported to the Americas) to between 9000 and 12,000 (80% of the total in 1620), largely derived from warfare.) despite fierce resistance from Queen Nzinga, and brief occupation of Luanda by the Dutch (allied to Kongo), Portugal controlled most of Ndongo by the 1670s. (Note: The Imbangala, a series of militaristic groups, served as mercenaries and were enlisted by both sides, but were especially decisive for the Portuguese. They were notorious for pillaging and causing destruction. One of the groups founded the Kasanje Kingdom.) Kongo had endured numerous civil wars throughout its history, though the rise of its vassal Soyo prevented consolidation, and the late-17th century saw Kongo fragment between royal houses as several vassals broke away; by the time of Kongo's restoration in 1709, it had ceased being the dominant regional power. Also during the 17th century, in the textile-producing northeast, the Boma, Yaka, and possibly the Kuba and Pende kingdoms broke away from Mwene Muji.

=== Great Lakes ===
During the 1st millennium CE the Great Lakes region saw several internal migrations of Bantu-speaking people out of the Urewe culture west of Lake Victoria. Simultaneously, symbiotic relations grew between pastoralists and agriculturalists, though there was likely also some competition over land use. Banana cultivation (derived from Southeast Asia) had spread widely by the end of the millennium. Periods of drought made farmers dependent on cattle-keepers, while periods of heavy rainfall produced rich harvests, shifting power relations. Polities are thought to have formed around the earthwork sites of Ntusi, Bigo, and Munsa among others. Nyoro traditions detail the history of a 'Kitara Empire', ruled successively by the Tembuzi and Chwezi dynasties. Most scholars consider the Tembuzi to be mythical, and the Chwezi to have been historical figures, usually dated to the 14th and 15th centuries. Although earlier scholars often interpreted Kitara as an expansive empire, most recent scholars are sceptical, (Note: Several historians regard the 'Kitara Empire' to have been a colonial construct created by British administrators and adopted by Nyoro historians to regain the Lost Counties. The concept came to be adopted by Ugandan nationalists as an ancient unification of Uganda predating British rule, and it remains popular among the Ugandan population and still features in some recent histories.) and Peter Robertshaw considered the Chwezi to have been religious leaders who utilised networks of hill-top shrines (Note: The shrines were dedicated to ancestral spirits of clans, and were common across the Great Lakes. They were closely associated with healing and collective prosperity, and served as centres.) to project authority. Around 1500, severe droughts and famine destabilised the region, occurring again during the early-17th and 18th centuries. Luo-speaking peoples migrated from the Upper Nile basin into modern-day Uganda, and a Biito dynasty replaced the Chwezi in Bunyoro-Kitara. The Siita dynasties of Nkore, Karagwe, and Haya states were replaced by Hinda dynasties, who trace their origin to the last Chwezi king and his cattle-keeper Ruhinda. To the east, Buganda was founded sometime in the first half of the second millennium, traditionally by Kintu. (Note: Ganda traditions say that in the region of Buganda Kintu is said to have found various indigenous clans (banansangwawo) who had thirty kings prior to Kintu's arrival. Kintu defeated their last king, Bemba Musota. Further clans are said to have migrated in from the east. According to tradition, Kintu disappeared after having founded the kingdom. Buganda likely initially controlled the counties of Kyadondo, Busiro, and Mawokota. Nyoro tradition says that Kimera, Buganda's third king, came from Bunyoro following the collapse of the Chwezi to found a Biito dynasty in Buganda. Prominent scholars such as Apollo Kaggwa and Lloyd Fallers considered Buganda's dynasty to have been local in origin, developing from primus inter pares patrilineal groups, which corroborates with the power clan heads had in Buganda's early history.) To the south, small states associated with clans saw increasing numbers of pastoralists who grew dominant and amalgamated them into the kingdom of Rwanda towards the end of the 15th century. Throughout the 16th and 17th centuries, Bunyoro raided states to its south such as Nkore and Rwanda. During the 18th century Mpororo rose and fragmented, while Buganda rapidly expanded at the expense of Bunyoro to become the major power in the region.

=== Eastern Congo Basin ===
In the central Congo Basin, farmers, fishermen, and hunters (often Pygmies) built symbiotic relations, and the Balega organised into bwami (socio-political collective 'grades' within a hierarchy). Mongo peoples migrated throughout the northeastern Congolian Rainforest, eventually organising into polities called nkumu. Some groups highly valued socio-political equality and disapproved of leaving it. In the Upemba Depression, people traded with the Copperbelt, and graves dated to the 8th century contained objects associated with authority, such as anvils and ceremonial axes. (Note: In Central African traditions, the first king is often said to have been a blacksmith.) Jan Vansina wrote that in the southern savanna, 'lords of the land' held priestly roles due to their special relationship with the spirits of the land, and held sway over multiple villages, effectively ruling embryonic kingdoms. Accordingly, as lineages grew, authority was opportunistically absorbed or incorporated by force. The centre of the Luba Empire is yet to undergo archaeological research, meaning knowledge about its rise is limited; its foundation is typically dated to the 14th/15th centuries, though scholarly estimates range from the 8th to 17th centuries. Luba-Katanga traditions (likely telescoped (Note: i.e. compressing historical events and processes)) detail the arrival of sacred kingship (bulopwe) in the narrative about tyrannical-conqueror Nkongolo and the prodigy Kalala Ilunga, where it is brought by the noble hunter Mbidi. Meanwhile, a Lunda state formed in the Nkalany Valley (estimates range from c. 1450 to c. 1700), and Lunda traditions say that queen Lueji married Mbidi's grandson and hunter Chibinda, whose son was the first Mwata Yamvo. (Note: Roland Oliver and Anthony Atmore wrote that the tradition likely represented a long process wherein a royally-commissioned Luba hunting expedition was sent to the Lunda and settled among them, gradually amalgamating Lunda polities into a state. Giacamo Macola however said that the differing institutions and linguistic data indicated that there was mutual cultural borrowing rather than a conquest.) In the 18th century, Lunda rapidly expanded into an extensive commonwealth across the southern savanna, using the institutions of perpetual kinship and positional succession (Note: 'Positional succession' was where a successor would take on their predecessor's identity, relationships, and duties, while 'perpetual kinship' involved permanent kinship ties between positions.) to incorporate peoples. Lunda lost several rulers in a long conflict (eventually won) against Kanyok to the north, and conquered the Pende and Yaka kingdoms in the west. The most important constituents in the east and south were Kazembe, Luvale, and Kanongesha. (Note: According to Mutumba Mainga, before Lunda's policy of expansion, an offshoot of its dynasty migrated south to found the Lozi Kingdom in western modern-day Zambia.) Meanwhile, Luba expanded its number of tributaries, in some cases using its widely-acknowledged prestige to intervene in succession disputes and distribute ritually-powerful royal regalia related to bulopwe, in other cases using conquest.

=== The East African coast and interior, and Madagascar ===
The East African coast and coastal archipelagos were dotted with proto-Swahili settlements, each with productive locally-developed industries. They participated in Indian Ocean trade, and converted to Islam from c. 800, enabling them to participate in Muslim trading networks. Trade boomed from the 10th century, and major city-states included Manda, Shanga, Mombasa, and Kilwa, the latter of which seized control of the Sofala gold trade from Mogadishu (according to the Kilwa Chronicle) and expanded its control along the coast. The interior was inhabited by pastoralist Cushitic and Nilotic speakers, along with Bantu speakers who continued to expand and adapt to their lands while absorbing the former two; the 17th century saw the establishment of tributary systems that stabilised the region. Madagascar had been settled by Austronesians who had traversed the Indian Ocean in outrigger canoes, likely sometime between the 5th and 7th centuries. (Note: Malagasy oral traditions describe finding a population from an earlier wave, the Vazimba (a 'way of life' rather than an ethnic group), who over time were displaced and absorbed.) The Antalaotra controlled trade on the northwest coast, while Malagasy societies organised and competed with one another over the island's estuaries and bridgeheads. (Note: Hasina was regarded as a spiritual force which imbued people with authority and facilitated social and political organisation. Over time, it became central to the development of a Malagasy ideology of kingship.) In the 15th century, trade routes for Zimbabwean gold shifted north, weakening Kilwa. The Portuguese arrived at the coast soon after, and exploited divisions between coastal city-states to gain control over them while utilising a powerful navy. Meanwhile, southern Madagascar was integrated into global trade; the Sakalava Empire rose to dominate west-coastal trade, accompanied by numerous other states, and the island saw several failed European colonial ventures. In the 17th and 18th centuries, Lamu-Swahili cities rebelled against the Portuguese and allied the Omani Empire which supplanted Portuguese rule.

=== Zambezia and the Zimbabwean Plateau ===
Map of trade centres and routes on the Zimbabwean Plateau

Just south of the Limpopo River, from c. 1000 growing wealth and inequality at Bambandyanalo led the population to move to the foot of Mapungubwe Hill c. 1220, (Note: The population at Bambandyanalo were agropastoralists, and maximised agricultural productivity in the semi-arid environment by moving large cattle herds to graze on other communities' lands in exchange for goods or services, which forged new socio-political relations. They also participated in the Indian Ocean trade via Swahili city-states, benefiting from the Limpopo-Shashe confluence being a trade centre.) while the ruler settled its flat summit; (Note: Hills served as rainmaking sites; after this move, Mapungubwe Hill became the sole such site, with its settlement by the ruler increasing his ritual power.) the Mapungubwe state grew to cover 30,000 km^{2} (12,000 sq mi). Around 1300, amid unknown events and shifting trade routes north, the state collapsed, and Great Zimbabwe, with its monumental dry-stone walls, rose to become the region's main political and economic centre. Its mambo (king) controlled the gold trade exporting to the east coast, and the state likely covered 50,000 km^{2} (19,000 sq mi). In the 15th century Angoche traders founded a new route along the Zambezi directly to the goldfields, contributing to the decline of Great Zimbabwe and the rise of Butua near the goldfields to its west and the Mutapa Empire on the northern Zimbabwean Plateau. After having left Luba territory in the 11th century, the Maravi arrived near Lake Malawi around the 15th century and incorporated the pre-existing Chewa politico-religious structure into their state. During the early-16th century, the Portuguese gained greater control over Zambezian trade. In the 17th century Muzura rapidly expanded the Maravi empire but failed to expel the Portuguese from Zambezia. In 1629 the Portuguese vassalised Mutapa by intervening in a succession conflict; the influx of prazo-holders (settlers) in Mutapa caused widespread lawlessness and insecurity, which exacerbated the devastation caused by drought, famine, and disease in the mid- to late-17th century. The 1680s and '90s saw the rise of Changamire Dombo who conquered Butua to found the Rozvi Empire and expelled all Portuguese from the Plateau. Around the same time, some members of the Rozvi dynasty migrated south and conquered the Venda groups in the Soutpansberg to found the Singo state; the kingdom fragmented around 1780 following shifting trade routes south and a succession conflict. The Maravi state collapsed amid succession crises in the 18th century, which also saw many migrations and the resettlement of much of the southern and central Plateau, replacing local dynasties and gradually weakening Rozvi power.

=== Southern Africa ===
By the late-1st millennium CE, Bantu-speaking farmers populated most of Southern Africa's cultivable savannas, reaching southwards to the Kei River; they traded goods such as livestock, grain, and metal tools between communities and with hunter-gatherers. Around the 11th century, more agriculturists—who likely brought with them ancestral Nguni and Sotho-Tswana languages—migrated across the Limpopo River and came to dominate the earlier farmers both politically and culturally, organising into loosely-defined chiefdoms that held dynamic alliance networks. Further south, the Dutch began colonising the western Cape in the 17th century, and Britain seized control of the colony around the turn of the 19th century. In the late-18th century, the interplay of pre-existing trends of political centralisation with the effects of international trade, environmental instability, and European colonisation set the Mfecane ("Crushing") in motion, as various African states were founded.

== c. 1800 – c. 1935 ==
By the turn of the 19th century, many of Africa's economic and political structures were unstable and brittle as a result of long-term effects of the slave trade. In Egypt Muhammad Ali led a national movement to seize power from Ottoman suzerainty, instituting sweeping reforms and greatly strengthening Egyptian power by militaristic expansion. Meanwhile, in West Africa the Fula jihads, which had been gaining momentum throughout the 18th century, culminated in the establishment of the expansive Sokoto and Hamdullahi caliphates. In the Horn, Ethiopia underwent reforms, seeking to revive the imperial state, something that was later achieved by Menelik II's conquests. In Southern Africa the Mfecane propelled large long-distance migrations that caused widespread disruption across the vast region, while several Boer republics were founded. European campaigns to abolish the Atlantic slave trade led to supply refocusing on internal markets and saw the rapid growth of the Indian Ocean slave trade. Across the continent many rulers attempted reforms and indigenous forms of 'modernisation', however these efforts were consistently undermined by European traders and missionaries as the tide of European encroachment rose.

For 400 years, European nations had mainly limited their involvement to trading stations on the African coast, with few daring to venture inland. The Industrial Revolution in Europe produced several technological innovations which assisted them in overcoming this 400-year pattern. One was the development of repeating rifles, which were easier and quicker to load than muskets. Artillery was being used increasingly. In 1885, Hiram S. Maxim developed the maxim gun, the model of the modern-day machine gun. European states kept these weapons largely among themselves by refusing to sell these weapons to African leaders. African germs took numerous European lives and deterred permanent settlements. Diseases such as yellow fever, sleeping sickness, yaws, and leprosy made Africa a very inhospitable place for Europeans. The deadliest disease was malaria, endemic throughout Tropical Africa. In 1854, the discovery of quinine and other medical innovations helped to make conquest and colonisation in Africa possible.

There were strong motives for conquest of Africa. Raw materials were needed for European factories, and free trade was championed to prevent Africans from regulating their economies. Prestige and imperial rivalries were at play. Acquiring African colonies would show rivals that a nation was powerful and significant. These contextual factors forged the Scramble for Africa; during the late-19th and early-20th centuries the European powers partitioned and conquered almost all of Africa despite fierce resistance (only Ethiopia and Liberia remained independent). Traditional leaders were incorporated into the colonial regimes as a form of indirect rule to extract human and natural resources and curb organized resistance. Colonial borders were drawn unilaterally by the Europeans, often cutting across bonds of kinship, language, culture, and established routes, and sometimes incorporating groups who previously had little in common. The threat to trade routes was mitigated by poor policing and African entrepreneurs (viewed as smugglers) who exploited the differing tax and legal schemes. The first few decades of European colonialism saw intense violence, disorder, and atrocities, such as that of the Congo Free State, German South West Africa, and French Algeria, with the late colonial period relatively peaceful in comparison. Colonial rule had wide-reaching effects on African societies, such as the spread of Christianity as part of the 'civilising mission'. African culture was strongly denigrated and persecuted, as pervasive racial discrimination deepened the scars of humiliation.

Areas controlled by European powers in 1939. British (red) and Belgian (marroon) colonies fought with the Allies. Italian (light green) with the Axis. French colonies (dark blue) fought alongside the Allies until the Fall of France in June 1940. Vichy was in control until the Free French prevailed in late 1942. Portuguese (dark green) and Spanish (yellow) colonies remained neutral.

== c. 1935 – present ==
Order of independence of African nations, 1950–2011

Imperialism ruled until after World War II when forces of African nationalism grew stronger. In the 1950s and 1960s the colonial holdings became independent states. The process was usually peaceful but there were several long bitter bloody civil wars, as in Algeria, Kenya, and elsewhere. Across Africa the powerful new force of nationalism drew upon the advanced militaristic skills that natives learned during the world wars serving in the British, French, and other armies. It led to organizations that were not controlled by or endorsed by either the colonial powers nor the traditional local power structures who were viewed as collaborators. Nationalistic organizations began to challenge both the traditional and the new colonial structures, and finally displaced them. Leaders of nationalist movements took control when the European authorities evacuated; many ruled for decades or until they died. In recent decades, many African countries have undergone the triumph and defeat of nationalistic fervour, changing in the process the loci of the centralizing state power and patrimonial state.

The wave of decolonization of Africa started with Libya in 1951, although Liberia, South Africa, Egypt and Ethiopia were already independent. Many countries followed in the 1950s and 1960s, with a peak in 1960 with the Year of Africa, which saw 17 African nations declare independence, including a large part of French West Africa. Most of the remaining countries gained independence throughout the 1960s, although some colonizers (Portugal in particular) were reluctant to relinquish sovereignty, resulting in bitter wars of independence which lasted for a decade or more.

The last African countries to gain formal independence were Guinea-Bissau (1974), Mozambique (1975) and Angola (1975) from Portugal; Djibouti from France in 1977; Zimbabwe from the United Kingdom in 1980; and Namibia from South Africa in 1990. Eritrea later split off from Ethiopia in 1993. The nascent countries, despite some prior talk of redrawing borders, decided to keep their colonial borders in the Organisation of African Unity (OAU) conference of 1964 due to fears of civil wars and regional instability, and placed emphasis on Pan-Africanism, with the OAU later developing into the African Union. During the 1990s and early 2000s there were the First and Second Congo Wars, often termed the African World Wars.

== See also ==
- Architecture of Africa
- History of science and technology in Africa
- Cradle of humanity
- Cradle of civilization
- Military history of Africa
- Genetic history of Africa
- Economic history of Africa
- African historiography
- List of history journals § Africa
- List of kingdoms in Africa throughout history
- List of sovereign states and dependent territories in Africa

== Sources ==
- Al-Mas'udi, Ali ibn al-Husain (1861–1917). Les Prairies D'Or. Vol. 9 vols. Ed. and Trans. Charles Barbier de Meynard and Abel Pavet de Courteille. Paris: Imprimerie Nationale.
- Collins, Robert O.; Burns, James M. (2007). A History of Sub-Saharan Africa. NY: Cambridge University Press. ISBN 978-0-521-68708-9.
- Diamond, Jared M. (1997). Guns, Germs, and Steel: The Fates of Human Societies. W. W. Norton & Company. ISBN 978-0-393-03891-0.
- Ehret, Christopher (2002). The Civilizations of Africa. Charlottesville, Virginia: University of Virginia. ISBN 0-8139-2085-X.
- Gomez, Michael (2018). African dominion: a new history of empire in early and medieval West Africa. Princeton, NJ: Princeton University Press. ISBN 978-0-691-17742-7.
- Levtzion, Nehemia; Hopkins, John F.P., eds. (2000). Corpus of Early Arabic Sources for West Africa. New York, NY: Marcus Weiner Press. ISBN 1-55876-241-8.
- McKinney, Robert C. (2004). The Case of Rhyme versus Reason: Ibn al-Rumi and His Poetics in Context. Leiden and Boston: Brill. ISBN 90-04-13010-1.
- Mamdani, Mahmood (1996). Citizen and subject: contemporary Africa and the legacy of late colonialism. Kampala: Fountain Publishers. ISBN 978-0-85255-399-2. OCLC 35445018.
- Nicholson, Paul T.; Shaw, Ian (2000). Ancient Egyptian Materials and Technology. Cambridge University Press. ISBN 978-0-521-45257-1.
- Prunier, Gérard (2009). Africa's World War: Congo, the Rwandan Genocide, and the Making of a Continental Catastrophe: Congo, the Rwandan Genocide, and the Making of a Continental Catastrophe. Oxford: Oxford University Press. ISBN 978-0-19-970583-2.
- Shillington, Kevin (2005). History of Africa (Revised 2nd ed.). New York City: Palgrave Macmillan. ISBN 0-333-59957-8.
