= History of Katanga =

This is a history of Katanga Province and the former independent State of Katanga, as well as the history of the region prior to colonization.

== Earliest residents ==
Prior to Bantu migration around 500 BCE, the area was probably the site of dwellings by much more widespread Khoisan and Pygmy hunter-gatherer peoples; the Katanga area is one of the few areas in the continent where concurrent settlements of both peoples have been identified. They were assimilated or driven out by the expansion of the Bantu peoples into the area.

== Luba settlement ==
The earliest permanent settlements in the Katanga region are, supposedly, those of the Luba people's ancestors, who settled in the Upemba Depression near Lake Upemba. In the marshes of the Upemba Depression, large scale cooperation was necessary to build and maintain dikes and drainage ditches. This kind of communal cooperation also made possible the construction of dams to stock fish during the long dry season. By the 8th century, the Luba were working in iron and trading in salt, palm oil, and dried fish. They used these products to trade for copper, charcoal (for iron smelting), glass beads, iron and cowrie shells from the Indian Ocean.

Several distinct societies developed out of the Upemba culture prior to the genesis of the Luba. Each of these societies based the foundation of their society on that of the one which preceded it (much in the way that many aspects of Roman culture were borrowed from the Greeks). The 5th century saw this societal evolution develop in the area around present day Kamilamba at the Kabambasee, which was followed and replaced by a number of other cultures which were based around the cities of Sanga and Katango.

The region in which these cultures appeared is particularly rich in ores and the civilization began to develop and implement iron and copper technology, in addition to trading in ivory and other goods. The Upemba established a strong commercial demand for their metal technologies and were able to institute a primitive but long-range commercial net (the business connections extended over 1500 km, all the way to the Indian Ocean). Additionally, the region was endowed with favorable agricultural conditions and a wealth of fish and game.

== From 1500s to the 1800s ==
Beginning in the late 16th century, the province was controlled by the Luba Empire and Lunda Kingdom, which spawned a migration of warriors and tribes into neighbouring regions. The Bemba, Kazembe-Lunda, Kanongesha-Lunda and Lozi in Zambia are just some of the people who trace their origins to Katanga.

=== Msiri's Yeke kingdom ===
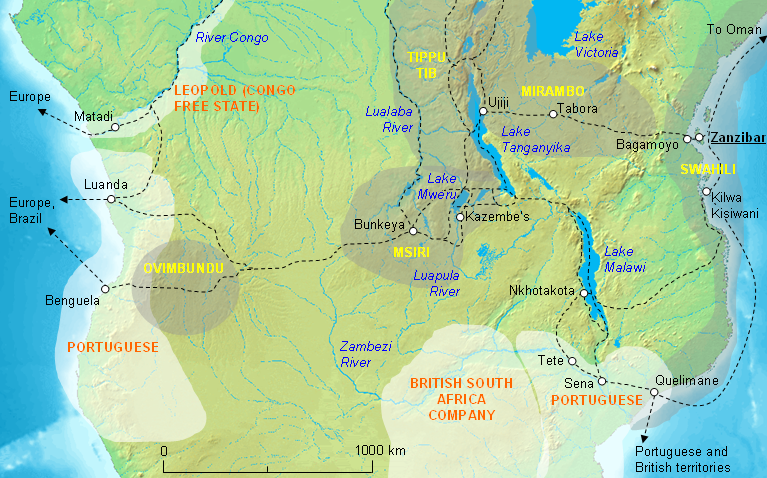
Msiri's kingdom in 1880

In the mid-19th century, a Nyamwezi trader from Tabora in modern-day Tanzania called Msiri founded the powerful but short-lived Yeke Kingdom. Msiri's home district was called Garanganza, a name which came to be used for the Yeke Kingdom as well. Msiri married the daughter of Chief Katanga, who protected him against the xenophobia of Chief Mpanda of Basanga. The name 'Katanga' is derived from Msiri's father-in-law. Msiri's power was based on copper, ivory and slaves, which he traded to both the west coast (Angola) and east coast (Zanzibar) for firearms and gunpowder, enabling him to transform himself within a few years into a warrior-king, conquering the territory between the Kasai River and Luapula River, the Zambezi-Congo watershed and Lake Upemba, taking over land and subject tribes from the Luba and Lunda peoples.

In the 1880s King Leopold II of Belgium, with the assistance of British explorer Henry Morton Stanley, established the Congo Free State (CFS) north of Katanga. His attention was drawn by reports of Katanga's copper wealth and the possibility of gold. Msiri tried to stall and play off Leopold's expeditions against those of the latter's European rival, Cecil Rhodes. Leopold sent the Stairs Expedition to raise the Congo Free State's flag by force if necessary. It was. Msiri was uncooperative, and was shot by one of the expedition's European officers on 28 December 1891.

== Colonial history under Belgian rule ==
Leopold took possession of Katanga and on 15 April 1891 its administration on behalf of the CFS was entrusted to another of Leopold's companies, the Compagnie du Katanga. No effective administration was set up until 19 June 1900, when it was renamed the Comité Spécial du Katanga, an administrative entity separate from the CFS. The Luba resisted, most notably in a major rebellion in 1895, after which many Luba were sent to work as forced labor in the copper mines of Katanga. Kasongo Nyembo led another rebellion of the Luba that was not suppressed by the Belgians until 1917.

After the take-over of the CFS from Leopold by the Belgian government, on 1 September 1910, Katanga was integrated into the Belgian Congo but retained a large measure of autonomy until 1 October 1933, when part of its Lomami Province was transferred to Kasaï Province.

On 1 October 1933, it was renamed the province of Élisabethville (in French; Elisabethstad in Dutch), after its capital (now Lubumbashi).

Once Katanga was firmly under Belgian control, and the mineral resources were heavily exploited by Belgian firms (notably Union Minière du Haut Katanga) the province was developed much more than the rest of the country. The Belgian mining cartel employed a mixture of contract mercenaries and hired guards to subdue the local population and to ensure transport of minerals and other goods out of the country. The Luba people opposed and often interfered with mining operations, and many were killed in raids on mining operations.

With the high demand of mining workforce in the region many people were brought from neighbouring regions, mostly Luba people from the Kasai area and even workers from Zambia.

== Congolese independence and Katangese secession ==
National flag of Katanga (1960–63)

After Congo was granted independence in June 1960, Katanga became an autonomous province. On 11 July 1960, Katanga broke away from the new Congolese government of Patrice Lumumba, declaring independence under Moise Tshombe, leader of a local party, the CONAKAT (Confédération des associations tribales du Katanga: Federation of Katanga tribal associations). Despite this, the new Katangese government did not have support throughout the province, especially not in the northern Baluba areas.

The declaration of independence was made with the support of Belgian business interests and over 6,000 Belgian troops. Tshombe was known to be close to the Belgian industrial companies which mined the area's rich resources of copper, gold and uranium.

Katanga was one of the richest and most developed areas of the Congo. Without it, Congo would lose a large part of its mineral assets and consequently of its government income. The view of the Congolese central government and of much of international opinion, was that the secession masked an attempt to create a Belgian-controlled puppet state run for the benefit of mining interests. Paradoxically, not even Belgium officially recognised the new state even though it provided Katanga with military assistance. The Luba were divided -- one faction under Ndaye Emanuel supported secession and another, under Kisula Ngoye, supported the central government.

In September 1960, Lumumba was replaced in a coup d'état. On 17 January 1961, he was sent to Lubumbashi, capital of Katanga, where he was tortured and executed shortly after arrival. Belgian officers, under Katangese command, were present at the execution.

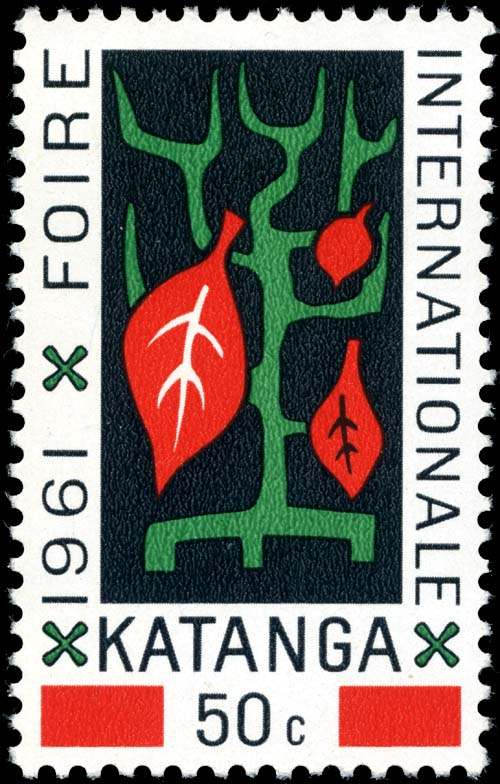
A postage stamp issued in 1961. Although Katanga was not a member of the UPU, its stamps were tolerated on international mail.

The UN Security Council met in the wake of Lumumba's death in a highly emotional atmosphere charged with anti-colonial feeling and rhetoric. On 21 February 1961 the Security Council adopted Resolution 161, which authorised 'all appropriate measures' to 'prevent the occurrence of civil war in the Congo, including ... the use of force, if necessary, in the last resort'. The resolution demanded the expulsion from the Congo of all Belgian troops and foreign mercenaries, but did not explicitly mandate the UN to conduct offensive operations. This resolution was ultimately interpreted by local UN forces to justify military operations to end the secession of Katanga. Despite this new resolution, during the next six months the UN undertook no major military operations, instead concentrating on facilitating several rounds of political negotiations.

In June, Tshombe signed a pledge to reunite Katanga with rest of the country, however by August it was clear he had no intention of implementing this agreement. In August and September, the UN conducted two operations to arrest and repatriate the mercenaries and political advisors by force. The second operation was resisted by the Katangese gendarmerie and resulted in casualties on both sides.

Peace negotiations ensued, in the course of which, UN secretary-general Dag Hammarskjöld died in uncertain circumstances in a plane crash near Ndola, Northern Rhodesia (now Zambia).

Under UN pressure, Tshombe later agreed to a three-stage plan from the acting Secretary General, U Thant, that would have reunited Katanga with Congo. However, this remained an agreement on paper only.

Urged on by Congolese leader Cyrille Adoula, UN forces launched a decisive attack on Katanga in December 1962. The capital, Elisabethville (now Lubumbashi), fell in January 1963, and Tshombe fled to Kolwezi, where he surrendered on January 15, 1963. The Katangese secession was formally ended by the National Conciliation Plan. Kisula Ngoye emerged as the governor of the new province.

== Post-Reunification ==
In 1966, the central government nationalized the Union Minière du Haut Katanga, now known as Gécamines. In 1971, Katanga was renamed Shaba, from the Swahili word for 'brass' (a borrowing from Arabic shabah). Throughout the 1970s, further insurrections like the 1977 Shaba I were put down by the government with help from foreign nations. On May 12, 1978, for example, rebels occupied the city of Kolwezi, the mining centre of the province. Zaire asked the United States, France, and Belgium to restore order. This resulted in 700 African and 170 European victims.

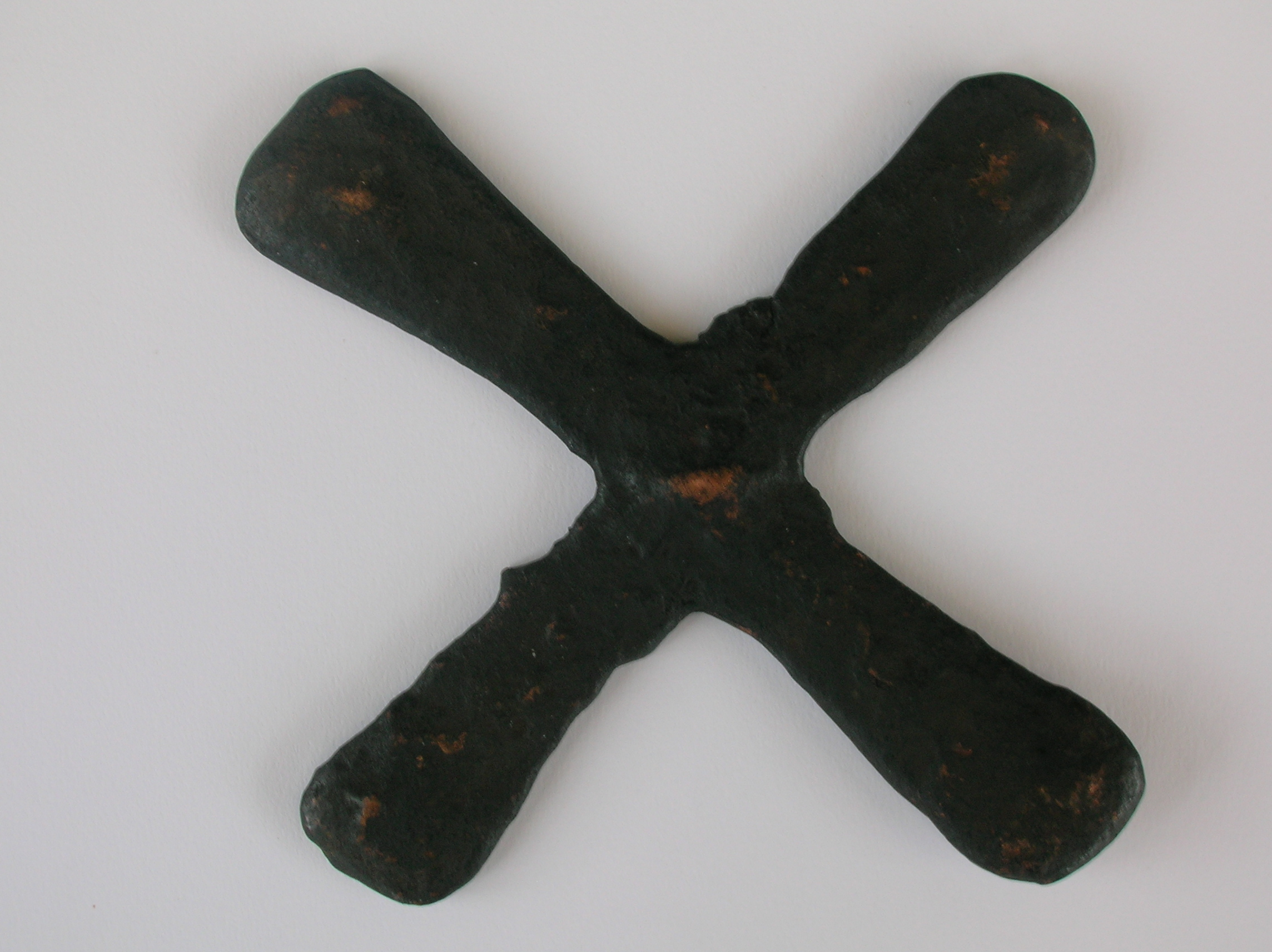
Katanga Cross. An archaic form of money.

In 1995, the African Commission on Human and Peoples' Rights considered a complaint entered by the Katanga People's Congress against Zaire alleging that Zaire breached the international law principle of self-determination, embodied in Article 20 of the African Charter on Human and Peoples' Rights, and requesting the Commission to recognise a right of secession for Katanga from Zaire.

The request was rejected, but in consistency with other international jurisprudence, on grounds that "The Commission is obligated to uphold the sovereignty and territorial integrity of Zaire", the Commission hinted that the people of Katanga might have a right to autonomy, as a form of "internal" self-determination.

The province became Katanga again in 1997 after Mobutu Sésé Seko was exiled, as part of the reverting of much of his 'zairisation' of colonial names.

Following the promulgation of the 2006 Constitution, originally due by February 2009 but since delayed, Katanga was to be divided into the following provinces:

- Haut-Katanga
- Tanganyika
- Lualaba
- Haut-Lomami

== Approximate correspondence between historical and current provinces ==
Approximate correspondence between historical and current provinces
Belgian Congo				Republic of the Congo		Zaire		Democratic Republic of the Congo	
1908	1919	1932	1947	1963	1966	1971	1988	1997	2015
22 districts	4 provinces	6 provinces	6 provinces	21 provinces + capital	8 provinces + capital	8 provinces + capital	11 provinces	11 provinces	26 provinces
Tanganika-Moero	Katanga	Élisabethville	Katanga	Nord-Katanga	Katanga	Shaba		Katanga	Tanganyika
Tanganika-Moero	Katanga	Élisabethville	Katanga	Nord-Katanga	Katanga	Shaba		Katanga	Haut-Lomami
Lulua	Katanga	Élisabethville	Katanga	Lualaba	Katanga	Shaba		Katanga	Lualaba
Haut-Luapula	Katanga	Élisabethville	Katanga	Katanga-Oriental	Katanga	Shaba		Katanga	Haut-Katanga
Lomami	Katanga	Lusambo	Kasaï	Lomami	Kasaï-Oriental				Lomami

== See also ==
- Lubumbashi history and timeline
