= Ishindi-Lunda people =

The Ishindi-Lunda (also called the Western Lunda) are an ethnic group living mainly in the North-Western Province of Zambia under Senior Chief Ishindi, around the provincial capital Zambezi. The Lunda people of North-Western Province consists of Kanongesha Lunda and Ishindi Lunda.

They descend from the Lunda people of the Lunda Kingdom and are closely related to Lunda people in Angola and DR Congo who all speak Chilunda. They are also related to the Kazembe-Lunda or Eastern Lunda, but the latter speak Chibemba.

Ishindi Lunda established Zambezi as the capital after leaving the Lunda Kingdom led by the Chief Ishindi, the first born son of Mwata Yamvo or Mwaant Yav. The arrival and conquest by the Ishindi Lunda is remembered in a traditional ceremony, held annually in August, called Lunda Lubanza. The ceremony that was revived in 1983 after a long absence. The ceremony signifies the conquest of the Ishindi Lunda in successfully fulfilling a mission that Chief Ishindi was given by his father, Mwata Yamvo or Mwaant Yav, to expand the Kingdom of Lunda dynasty. In the 1854 ceremony, Scottish missionary Dr David Livingstone is said to have attended and he was honoured by Mwant shindi Kawumbu.
