= Pre-colonial history of the Democratic Republic of the Congo =

The pre-colonial history of the modern-day Democratic Republic of the Congo encompasses the history of the Congo Basin region up to the establishment of European colonial rule in the era of New Imperialism and particularly the creation of the Congo Free State and its expansion into the interior after 1885. As the modern territorial boundaries of the Democratic Republic of the Congo did not exist in this period, it is inseparable from the wider pre-colonial histories of Central Africa, the Great Lakes and Rift Valley as well as the Atlantic World and Swahili coast.

The current territory of the Democratic Republic of Congo was occupied by humans in the Paleolithic at least 80,000 years ago. Waves of Bantu migrations from 2000 BC to 500 AD moved into the basin from the northwest and covered the precolonial states absorbed or overthrown by the colonial powers.

The Bantu migrations added to and displaced the indigenous Pygmy populations in the southern regions of the modern Congo states. The Bantu imported agriculture and iron-working techniques from West Africa into the area, as well as establishing the Bantu language family as the primary set of tongues for the Congolese. Subsequent migrations from the Darfur and Kurdufan regions of Sudan into the north of Congo, as well as East Africans migrating into the eastern Congo, added to the mix of ethnic groups.

== Paleolithic ==
The area now known as the Democratic Republic of the Congo was populated as early as 90,000 years ago, as shown by the 1988 discovery of the Semliki harpoon at Katanda, one of the oldest barbed harpoons ever found, and which is believed to have been used to catch giant river catfish.

In 1960 the Ishango bone tool was discovered, fashioned from the fibula of a baboon with a sharp piece of quartz affixed to one end, perhaps for engraving. It was first thought to be a tally stick, as it has a series of what has been interpreted as tally marks carved in three columns running the length of the tool, but some scientists have suggested that the groupings of the notches indicate a mathematical understanding that goes beyond counting. It is now believed to be more than 20,000 years old.

== Bantu migration ==
The Bantu expansion is thought to have reached modern day DRC as well as Northern Angola and Zambia possibly as early as 500 BC, and then gradually started to expand southward.

Their propagation was accelerated by the adoption of pastoralism and of Iron Age technology. The people living in the south and southwest were hunter-gatherer groups, whose technology involved only minimal use of metal technologies. The development of metal tools during this time period revolutionized agriculture and animal husbandry. This led to the displacement of the hunter-gatherer groups in the east and southeast.

The 10th century marked the final expansion of the Bantu in West-Central Africa. A rising population soon made intricate local, regional and foreign commercial nets possible, forming networks that traded mostly in salt, iron and copper.

== Upemba culture ==
In the 5th century, a society began to develop in the Upemba depression along the banks of the Lualaba River in Katanga. This culture, known as the Upemba civilization, would eventually evolve into the more significant Luba Empire, as well as the Kingdom of Lunda.

The process in which the primitive original Upemba society transitioned into the Luba kingdom was gradual and complex. This transition ran without interruption, with several distinct societies developing out of the Upemba culture prior to the genesis of the Luba. Each of these societies based the foundation of their society on that of the one which preceded it (much in the way that many aspects of Roman culture were borrowed from the Greeks). The 5th century saw this societal evolution develop in the area around present day Kamilamba at the Kabambasee, which was followed and replaced by a number of other cultures which were based around the cities of Sanga and Katango.

The region in which these cultures appeared is particularly rich in ore and these civilizations began to develop and implement iron and copper technology, in addition to trading in ivory and other goods. The Upemba established a strong commercial demand for their metal technologies and were able to institute a long-range commercial net (the business connections extended over 1500 km, all the way to the Indian Ocean). Additionally, the region was endowed with favorable agricultural conditions and a wealth of fish and game.

Its strong economy and food-base allowed the region to become extremely wealthy. So wealthy, in fact, that cities and centralized government based on a chieftain system developed. The political institution of the chieftain became generally accepted and these rulers became increasingly powerful, especially at the end of the 16th century.

== Effects of geography and climate ==
Additionally, it must be mentioned that, as is this case today, the Congo River and its tributaries, as well as climatic conditions in general, play a powerful role in shaping the lives of the inhabitants of the Congo. The rivers are and were tremendously important to regional trade and provide a vast natural network for such activities, in addition to providing a source of food and water to the population.

It must also be mentioned that the climate is a major force in the Congo, which is made up primarily of tropical rainforest that sees some of the highest annual rainfall in the world. This high amount of rainfall makes it difficult to sustain agriculture, and subsequently a large population because the soil is simply too watered-down and prone to periodic floods to produce large quantities of food. For this reason, the population of the Congo has maintained a low population in addition to an extremely low population density.

Also, much has been made about the large number of hunter-gatherer groups that inhabit the Congo, especially the Pygmy population. The reason for this particular life-style being so prominent in the Congo is geographical and climatic: the area is simply not capable of producing a large amount of food from agriculture, and as a result, a portion of the population has continued to hunt and gather because it is a much more sustainable way of life.

== Cultural practices ==
=== Religion and Spirituality ===
The Congo region was home to a wide array of ethnicities and communities and therefore differing spiritual and religious practices. Due to the scarcity in precolonial documentation the exact nature and dates of development of some of these practices remain elusive. The religions practised in precolonial Congo were as far as is known animistic in nature. They believed that places, objects and creatures could possess a spiritual essence and practised ancestral worship.

According to the religion practised by the Bakongo people the world is split into the world of the living and the world of the dead. Shamans known as Nganga can mediate between these two worlds. A specific characteristic of the Kongo religion is the so-called cosmogram. It is believed the highest god, next to other high gods, resides at the top of the world, the spirits and other deities living below, followed by the physical realm populated by humans and animals, with water existing in the middle where the two worlds meet.

When people die, their souls leave their bodies to travel to the realm of the dead, but can still be contacted or called upon by means of prayer. The dead talk to the living through dreams, omens or through shamans.

Similar characteristics are seen in the Baluba religion, where priests can also serve as intermediaries between the natural and supernatural world. The traditional religious beliefs of the Luba people included the concept of a Universal Creator, a Leza or the Supreme Being, a natural world and a supernatural world. The supernatural world was where ancestral spirits lived, and what one joined the afterlife if one lived a righteous life.

The Bakuba people from the Kingdom of Kuba believed in a single creator deity, named Bumba or m'Bombo. He is said to have originally existed alone in darkness, in a universe consisting of nothing but primordial water. The creation took place when he vomited the sun, moon, animals and then humanity.

=== Cannibalism ===
Although cannibalism was indeed practiced in the (eastern) Congo region, some of contemporary accounts were the result of exaggeration and miscommunication. The attitudes towards cannibalism in the Congo region varied significantly, with certain cultures practicing cannibalism in certain contexts while in other cultures cannibalism was either only practiced by certain individuals or shunned altogether and its practitioners dehumanized. The most infamous militia were the so-called Zappo Zap, a subgroup of the Songye people. They had a habit of eating their fallen enemies, and were said to consider human meat a delicacy. These warrior cultures were also used by both the Leopoldian forces as well as the Arab slavers during the Congo-Arab war. During the 1892–1894 war between the Congo Free State and the Swahili-Arab city-states of Nyangwe and Kasongo in Eastern Congo, there were reports of widespread cannibalization of the bodies of defeated Arab combatants by the Batetela allies of Belgian commander Francis Dhanis.

== Kingdom of Kongo (1390–1914) ==
A map of pre-European African civilisations.

By the 13th century there were three main federations of states in the western Congo Basin. In the east were the Seven Kingdoms of Kongo dia Nlaza, considered to be the oldest and most powerful, which likely included Nsundi, Mbata, Mpangu, and possibly Kundi and Okanga. South of these was Mpemba which stretched from modern-day Angola to the Congo River. It included various kingdoms such as Mpemba Kasi and Vunda. To its west across the Congo River was a confederation of three small states; Vungu (its leader), Kakongo, and Ngoyo.

The dominant political force of the Congo region prior to and during the initial arrival of Europeans was the Kingdom of Kongo. The Kongo was a state located primarily in the southwest portion of the modern Congo, and also occupying portions of northern Angola and Cabinda. At its greatest extent, the kingdom reached from the Atlantic Ocean in the west to the Kwango River in the east, and from the Point Noire in the north to the Loje River in the south.

The kingdom was headed by a king known as the Manikongo, who exercised his authority over the six provinces that constituted the Kongo kingdom and the Bakongo (Kongo peoples). When the Kongo Kingdom was at its political apex in the 15th and 16th centuries, the King, who had to be a male descendant of Wene, reigned supreme.

He was elected by a group of governors, usually the heads of important families and occasionally including Portuguese officials. The activities of the court were supported by an extensive system of civil servants, and the court itself usually consisted of numerous male relatives of the King.

The villages were often governed by lesser relatives of the King who were responsible to him. All members of government were invested with their power under the auspices of a ritual specialist. The Manikongo personally appointed a kind of governor for each of the six provinces to oversee each from his capital, Mbanza-Kongo. The city is now known by the same name as the capital of an Angolan province, but was for a time renamed by the Manikongo to 'São Salvador' in an effort to adopt Portuguese culture.

In its prime, the Kingdom exacted taxes, forced labor, and collected fines from its citizens in order to prosper. At times, enslaved peoples, ivory, and copper were traded to the Europeans on the coast. The most important harbor was Mpinda (modern Soyo). In addition to the six provinces, the Kongo kingdom also established a sphere of influence in a number of outlying areas from which it was able to extract tribute.

The kingdom was also at the center of an extensive Central African trade network in which it traded and produced large quantities of ivory, as well as manufacturing copperware, raffia cloth, and pottery, along with other natural resources (The eastern region of the Congo [such as the province of Katanga] is particularly rich in mineral resources, especially diamonds). These trade goods would also form, in addition to slaves, the backbone of the Kongo's trade with Europeans (primarily the Portuguese), upon their arrival.

The aforementioned slave trade was to be a significant factor in bringing about the end of Kongo, as the elites of the kingdom allowed European slave traders to eliminate a significant percentage of the population.

When King Álvaro I, came to the throne in an environment of contestation in 1568, he immediately had to fight invaders from the east (who some authorities believe were actually rebels within the country, either peasants or discontented nobles) called the "Jagas". To do this, he had to enlist the aid of the Portuguese based at São Tomé, who sent an expedition under Francisco de Gouveia Sottomaior to assist. At the same time, however, Álvaro had to allow the Portuguese to establish a colony in his province of Luanda in the south of his country. Kongo provided the Portuguese with support in their war against the Kingdom of Ndongo, located in the interior east of Luanda, when Portugal went to war with it in 1579. Eventually the Portuguese would gain control over most of the surrounding territory which led to increasing tensions with the Kongo.

At the Battle of Ambuila in 1665, the Portuguese forces from Angola defeated the forces of king Antonio I of Kongo; Antonio was killed with many of his courtiers and the Luso-African author Manuel Roboredo, who had attempted to prevent this final war. Nevertheless, the country continued to exist, at least in name, for over two centuries, until the realm was divided among Portugal, Belgium, and France at the Conference of Berlin in 1884-1885.

== Luba Kingdom (1585–1889) ==
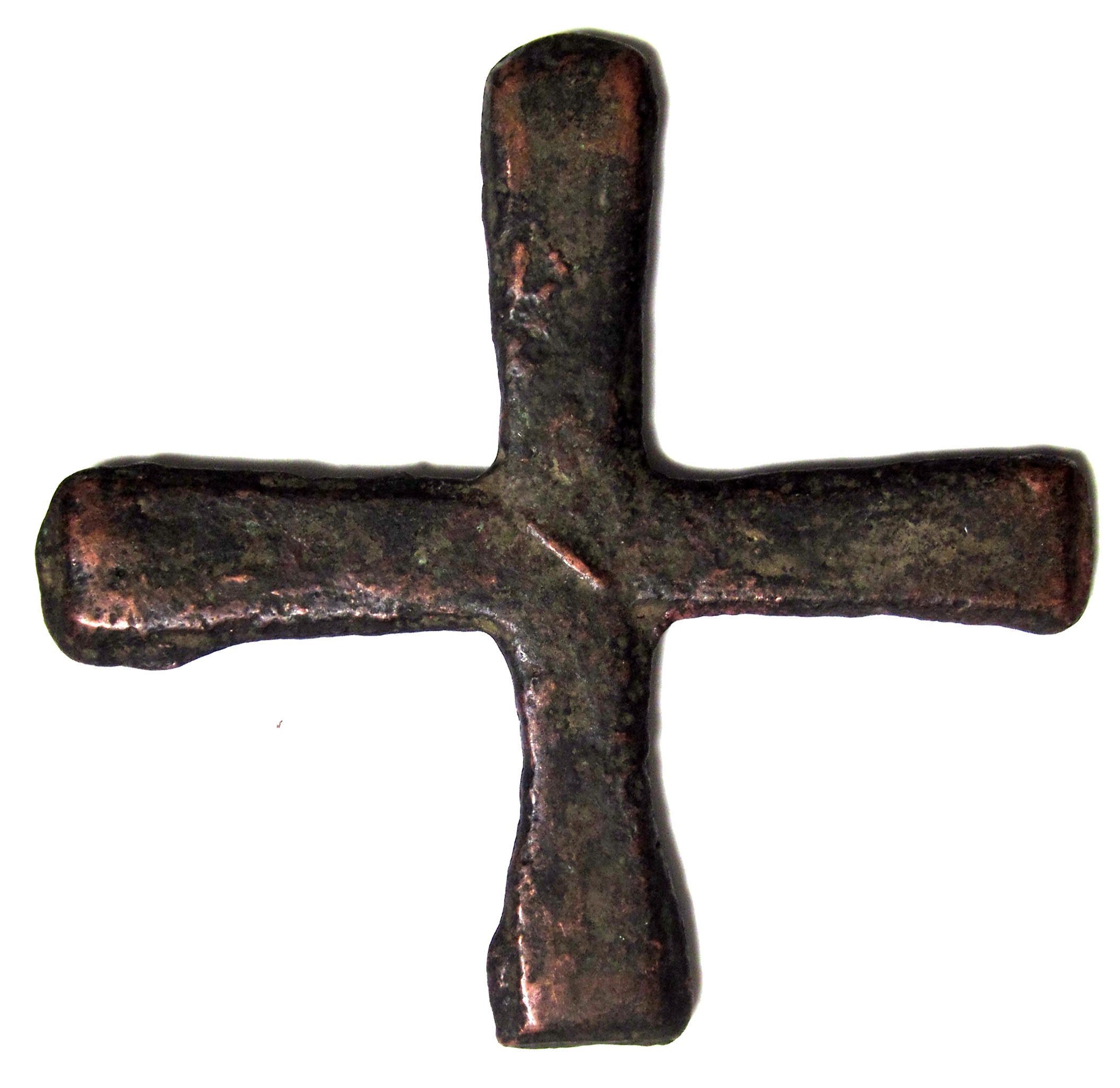
A "Katanga Cross", a form of pre-colonial money used in the Katanga and Copperbelt region testifies to pre-colonial mining and moulding of copper

The Luba Kingdom arose out of the Upemba culture and was founded by King Kongolo around 1585. His nephew and immediate, Kalala Ilunga, expanded into an Empire over neighbouring states on the upper left bank territories of the Lualaba River. At its peak, the empire had about a million people paying tribute to its king.

The Luba Empire's success was due in large part to its development of a form of a government durable enough to withstand the disruptions of succession disputes and flexible enough to incorporate foreign leaders and governments. It was based on the twin principles of sacred kingship and rule by council. The Luba model of governing was so successful, it was adopted by the Lunda Kingdom and spread throughout Katanga and northern Angola as well as northwestern Zambia and its Luapula Province.

== Lunda Kingdom (1665–1887) ==
The birth of the Lunda Kingdom is traced back to Ilunga Tshibinda who left his brother's Luba Kingdom and married a princess from an area in the south of Katanga. Their son, Mwaant Yav or Mwata Yamvo formed the central Lunda Kingdom there with a population of about 175,000 and became its ruler from 1660 to 1665. His title and name was passed to his descendants and successors as rulers of the kingdom.

The Lunda kings became powerful militarily and then politically through marriage with descendants of the Luba kings. The Lunda people were able to settle and colonialize other areas and tribes, thus extending their empire through southwest Katanga into Angola and north-western Zambia, and eastwards across Katanga into what is now the Luapula Province of Zambia. The empire became a confederation of a number of kingdoms or chieftainships which enjoyed a degree of local autonomy (as long as tributes were paid), with Mwata Yamvo as paramount ruler, and a ruling council (following the Luba model) to assist with administration.

In the 18th Century a number of migrations took place from the Lunda Empire as far as the region to the south of Lake Tanganyika. The Bemba people under Chitimukulu migrated from the Lunda Kingdom to Northern Zambia. At the same time, a Lunda chief and warrior called Mwata Kazembe set up an Eastern Lunda kingdom in the valley of the Luapula River.

== Yeke Kingdom (1856–1891) ==
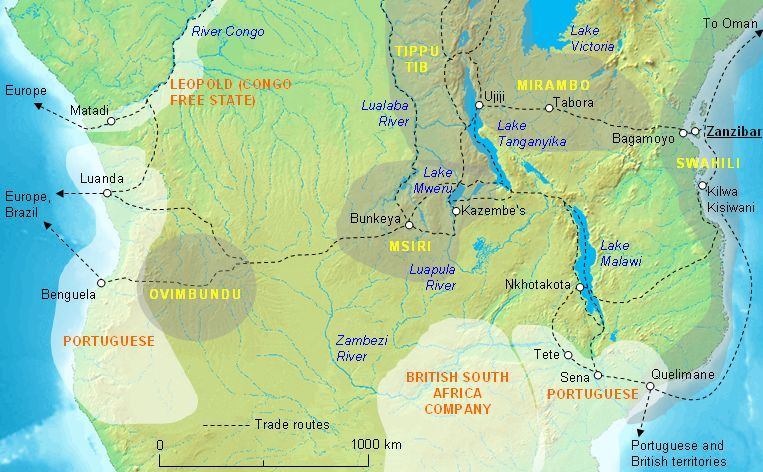
Southern Central Africa in 1890 showing the central position of Msiri's Yeke Kingdom and the principal trade routes, with the approximate territories of Msiri's main allies (names in yellow) and the approximate areas occupied by European powers (names in orange — does not show spheres of influence or borders). The east coast trade was controlled by the Sultan of Zanzibar. Areas of influence of other tribes and of France and Germany are not shown.

The Yeke Kingdom (or Garanganze Kingdom) in Katanga was short-lived, existing from about 1856 to 1891 under one king, Msiri, a Nyamwezi (also known as 'Yeke') from Tabora in Tanzania who got himself appointed as successor to a Wasanga chief west of the Luapula River by defeating the chief's Lunda enemies.

Once installed he conquered the neighbouring tribes and expanded the chieftainship into a kingdom, taking over the western territory of Mwata Kazembe and subjugating tribes in the southwest, on the trading route to Angola. When King Leopold II of Belgium and British diamond magnate Cecil Rhodes heard that the Yeke Kingdom controlled east-west trade and was rich in copper and possibly gold, they sent competing expeditions to try to negotiate a treaty with the kingdom.

The Stairs Expedition sent by Leopold under the flag of his Congo Free State was the winner of this scramble for Katanga when it met and killed Msiri (putting his head on a pole as a 'lesson' to his people), and installed a successor who would sign Katanga over to Leopold. The chieftainship continues to this day under the title Mwami Mwenda ('Mwenda' was one of Msiri's names).

== Kuba Federation ==
The Kuba Kingdom, or more accurately, the Kuba Federation, was a political entity (one comprising a collection of approximately twenty Bantu ethnic groups) that began to develop out of a number of decentralized, ethnically Bantu states (namely the Luba, the Leele, and the Wongo ethnic groups).

The federation's capital was Nsheng, which is now modern Mushenge. The name “Kuba” is derived from the term used by the Luba (whose kingdom lay to the south of the Kuba) for the civilization.

Because of its relative remoteness in the southern Congo, Kuba was largely spared the turmoil of both Euro-American and Arab slave trades. As a result, the civilization was able to maintain itself until the 19th century. Also due mainly to its location, even after King Leopold II of Belgium established the Congo Free State in 1885, the Kuba were able to sustain their federation, which comprised some 100,000 square kilometers and had a population of approximately 150,000 inhabitants.

The Belgians began attempting to gain the acceptance of the Kuba in the early 1880s; however, the gifts Belgium attempted to give were always rejected and king aMbweeky aMileng threatened to behead any foreign intruders. As a result of their fear of white foreigners, it was not until the African-American missionary William Sheppard made contact with the Kuba that a foreigner would gain their acceptance. This was mainly due to his African blood and Sheppard was able to live amongst the Kuba for four months.

Eventually, after colonial officials were able to enforce their authority upon the Kuba near the end of the 19th century, the entire region became increasingly unstable. However, the well-organized Kuba fought relentlessly against the regime and the area was one of the main sectors of resistance to Belgium throughout its rule.

== Other states ==
The Kongo and the Kuba were the largest political entities in the precolonial Congo area. However, there were numerous other, much smaller states scattered throughout the territory in the north and northeast, with Pygmies and other primarily hunter-gatherer populations located mostly in the southern portions of the region.

Of particular note is that the populations of the Eastern regions of the precolonial Congo were heavily disrupted by constant slaving, mainly from Zanzibari slave dealers such as the infamous Tippu Tip (though he would come after the Europeans' entrance onto the scene). The slave trade in this portion of Africa was primarily Arab in nature (in contrast to the European or Atlantic Slave Trade, which took place primarily in West Africa, the Arab slave trade was located on the eastern coast of the continent), with captured persons being shipped off to the Middle East or to holdings of Arabian kingdoms for labor.
