= Lunda Lubanza =

Lunda Lubanza traditional ceremony is celebrated by the Lunda people of senior Chief Ishindi during the month of August every year at Mukanda Nkunda in Zambezi district of the North-Western Province of Zambia.

== Meaning ==
The Lunda Lubanza traditional ceremony is held to commemorate the coming of the Ishindi Lunda people from Lunda Kingdom of Mwata Yamvo or Mwaant Yav. The ceremony symbolizes the unity of all Lunda speaking people that have settled in Angola, Democratic Republic of Congo and Zambia.

== Celebration duration and activities ==
The ceremony is held every year in August. The ceremony is held to remember the arrival and conquest by the Ishindi Lunda. Although right now it is held every year, the ceremony was only revived in 1983 after a long absence. The ceremony signifies the conquest of the Ishindi Lunda in successfully fulfilling a mission that Chief Ishindi was given by his father, Mwata Yamvo or Mwaant Yav, to expand the Kingdom of Lunda dynasty. In the 1854 ceremony, Scottish missionary Dr David Livingstone is said to have attended and he was honoured by Mwant shindi Kawumbu.

The climax of the event is when Senior Chief Ishindi comes out of his palace to meet his subjects and discuss matters affecting his Lunda Chiefdom.

== See also ==
- Lunda Kingdom
- Lunda people
- Ishindi Lunda

== References and further reading ==
- Musicinafrica.net: Lunda Lubanza website accessed 7 October 2016.
- Allafrica.com: Zambia: Mwati Yamv Preaches Peace At Lunda Lubanza website accessed 7 October 2016.
- Kutachika.com: Lunda Lubanza website accessed 7 October 2016.
- Lunda Lubanza: A medley of cultures website accessed 7 October 2016.
