= Kanongesha-Lunda people =

The Kanongesha-Lunda (also called the Western Lunda) are an ethnic group living mainly in the North-Western Province of Zambia under Senior Chief Kanongesha, around the provincial capital Mwinilunga. The Lunda people of North-Western Province consists of Kanongesha Lunda and Ishindi Lunda.

They are descended from the Lunda people of the Lunda Kingdom and are closely related to Lunda people in Angola and DR Congo who like them speak Chilunda. They are also related to the Kazembe-Lunda or Eastern Lunda, but the latter speak Chibemba.
