= Mushid =

Mushid is:

- the throne of an Indian princely state if occupied by a Muslim dynasty (the Hindu equivalent is gadhi 'cushion')
- an African first name, as borne by some Rulers of Ruund (Luunda)
