= United Nations Security Council Resolution 169 =

UN Security Council Resolution 169
- Date: November 24 1961
- Meeting no.: 982
- Code: S/5002 (Document)
- Subject: The Congo Question
- Voting summary: 9 voted for; None voted against; 2 abstained
- Result: Adopted

Security Council composition
- Permanent members: China; France; Soviet Union; United Kingdom; United States
- Non-permanent members: Ceylon; Chile; Ecuador; Liberia; Turkey; United Arab Republic

United Nations Security Council Resolution 169, adopted on November 24, 1961, deprecated the secessionist activities in Katanga as well as armed action against United Nations forces and insisted that those activities cease. The council then authorized the Secretary-General to take whatever action necessary to immediately apprehend and deport all foreign military personnel, paramilitary personnel and mercenaries not with the UN and requested that the SG take all necessary measures to prevent their return. The Council then asked all member states to aid the Government of the Republic of the Congo and to prevent any actions which might contribute to the conflict there.

The resolution passed with nine votes to none; France and the United Kingdom abstained.

== See also ==
- List of United Nations Security Council Resolutions 101 to 200 (1953–1965)
- Resolutions 143, 145, 146, 157, and 161
- The Congo Crisis
