= United Nations Security Council Resolution 146 =

United Nations Security Council resolution

UN Security Council Resolution 146
- Date: August 9 1960
- Meeting no.: 886
- Code: S/4426 (Document)
- Subject: The Congo Question
- Voting summary: 9 voted for; None voted against; 2 abstained
- Result: Adopted

Security Council composition
- Permanent members: China; France; Soviet Union; United Kingdom; United States
- Non-permanent members: Argentina; Ceylon; Ecuador; Italy; Poland; Tunisia

United Nations Security Council Resolution 146, adopted on August 9, 1960, after a report by the Secretary-General regarding the implementation of resolutions 143 and 145 the Council confirmed his authority to carry out the responsibility placed on him thereby and called upon Belgium to withdraw its troops from Katanga. The Council then, while reaffirming that the United Nations Force in the Congo would not be a party to or in any way intervene in any internal conflict, declared that the entry of UN Forces into Katanga was necessary for the full implementation of the present resolution.

The resolution was approved by nine votes; France and Italy abstained.

== See also ==
- List of United Nations Security Council Resolutions 101 to 200 (1953–1965)
- Resolutions 143, 145, 157, 161 and 169
- The Congo Crisis
