= United Nations Security Council Resolution 143 =

United Nations Security Council resolution

UN Security Council Resolution 143
- Date: July 14, 1960
- Meeting no.: 873
- Code: S/4387 (Document)
- Subject: The Congo Question
- Voting summary: 8 voted for; None voted against; 3 abstained
- Result: Adopted

Security Council composition
- Permanent members: China; France; Soviet Union; United Kingdom; United States
- Non-permanent members: Argentina; Ceylon; Ecuador; Italy; Poland; Tunisia

United Nations Security Council Resolution 143 was adopted on July 14, 1960. With Congolese requests for assistance in front of him, following the Mutiny of the Force Publique, Secretary-General of the United Nations Dag Hammarskjöld had called a meeting for the evening of July 13, acting under Article 99 of the Charter. After the Secretary-General's report and a request for military assistance by the President and Prime Minister of the Republic of the Congo (Leopoldville) to protect its territory, the Council called upon Belgium to withdraw its troops from the territory and authorized the Secretary-General to take the necessary steps to provide the Government with such military assistance that the national security forces may be able to meet fully their tasks. The Council asked the Secretary General to report to the Security Council as appropriate.

The resolution was adopted with eight votes to none; France, the Republic of China, and the United Kingdom abstained.

== See also ==
- List of United Nations Security Council Resolutions 101 to 200 (1953–1965)
- Resolutions 145, 146, 157, 161 and 169
- The Congo Crisis
- United Nations Operation in the Congo
