= United Nations Security Council Resolution 157 =

United Nations Security Council resolution

UN Security Council Resolution 157
- Date: 17 September 1960
- Meeting no.: 906
- Code: S/4526 (Document)
- Subject: The Congo Question
- Voting summary: 8 voted for; 2 voted against; 1 abstained
- Result: Adopted

Security Council composition
- Permanent members: China; France; Soviet Union; United Kingdom; United States
- Non-permanent members: Argentina; Ceylon; Ecuador; Italy; Poland; Tunisia

United Nations Security Council Resolution 157 was adopted on 17 September 1960. After a discussion of the Congo Crisis led to a lack of unanimity among the Security Council's permanent members and thus prevented it from exercising its primary responsibility for the maintenance of international peace and security, the Council decided to call an emergency special session of the General Assembly to make appropriate recommendations.

Resolution 157 was adopted with eight votes to two (People's Republic of Poland and the Soviet Union) and one abstention from France.

The fourth emergency special session of the United Nations General Assembly met on 17 to 19 September 1960.

== See also ==
- Congo Crisis
- Resolutions 143, 145, 146, 161 and 169
- List of United Nations Security Council Resolutions 101 to 200 (1953–1965)
