= United Nations Security Council Resolution 161 =

UN Security Council Resolution 161
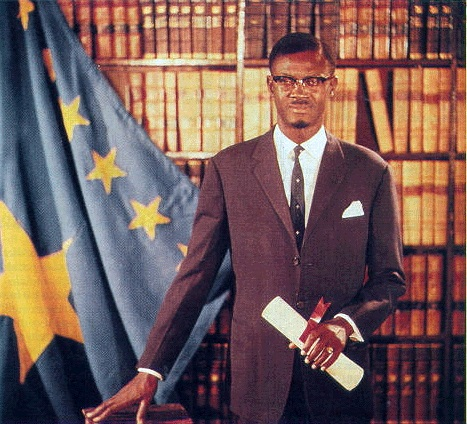
- Patrice Lumumba
- Date: February 21 1961
- Meeting no.: 942
- Code: S/4741 (Document)
- Subject: The Congo Question
- Voting summary: 9 voted for; None voted against; 2 abstained
- Result: Adopted

Security Council composition
- Permanent members: China; France; Soviet Union; United Kingdom; United States
- Non-permanent members: Ceylon; Chile; Ecuador; Liberia; Turkey; United Arab Republic

United Nations Security Council Resolution 161 was adopted on February 21, 1961. After noting the killings of Patrice Lumumba, Maurice Mpolo and Joseph Okito and a report of the Secretary-General's Special Representative, the Council urged the United Nations to immediately take measures to prevent the occurrence of civil war in the Congo, even if the use of force is necessary. The Council further urged the withdrawal of all Belgian and other foreign military, paramilitary personnel and mercenaries not with the UN and called upon all states to take measures to deny transport and other facilities to such personnel moving into the Congo. The council also decided that it would launch an investigation into the death of Lumumba and his colleagues promising punishment to the perpetrators.

The resolution was approved by nine votes to none; France and the Soviet Union abstained.

== See also ==
- List of United Nations Security Council Resolutions 101 to 200 (1953–1965)
- Resolutions 143, 145, 146, 157, and 169
- The Congo Crisis
- History of Katanga
