= United Nations Security Council Resolution 145 =

United Nations Security Council resolution

UN Security Council Resolution 145
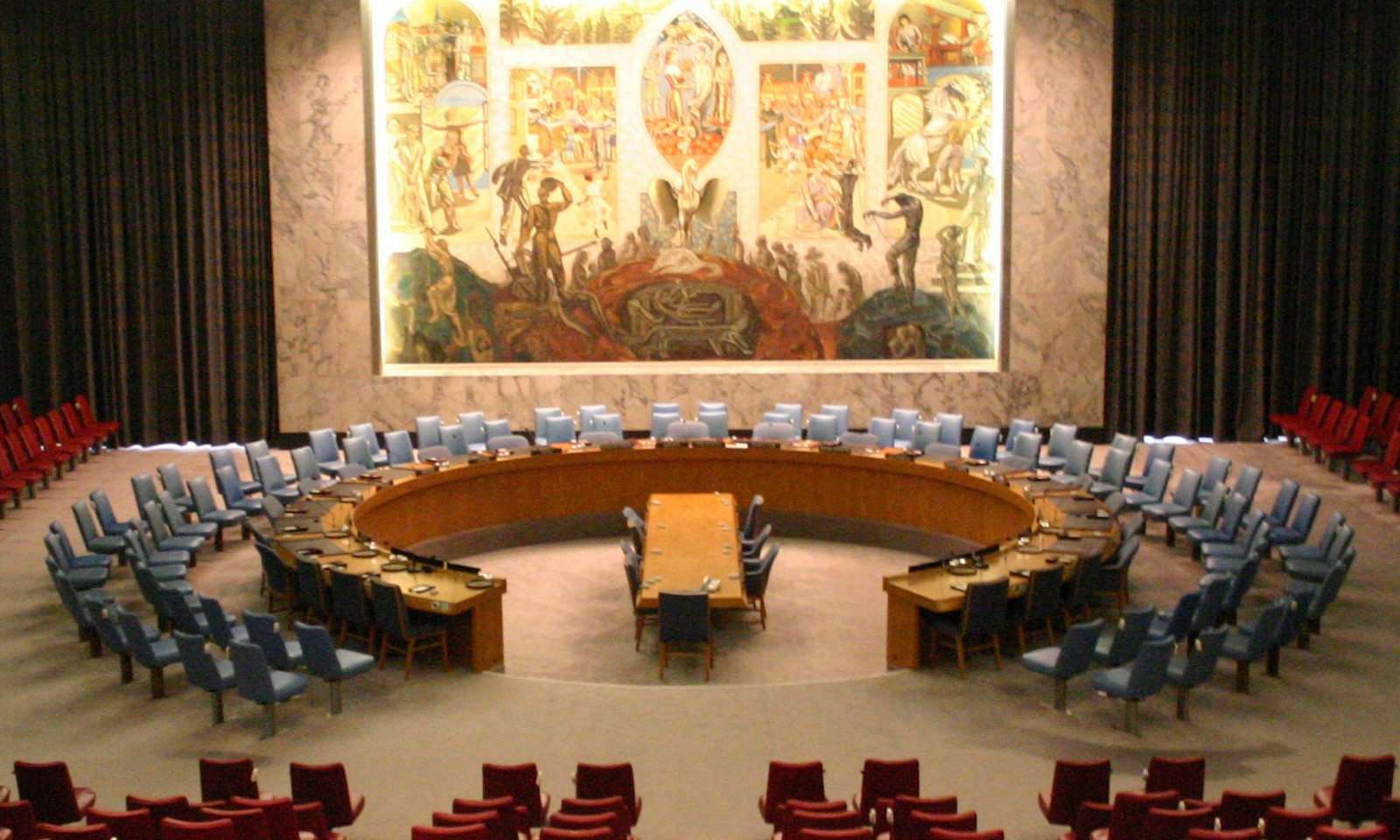
- UN Security Council Chamber, NYC
- Date: 22 July 1960
- Meeting no.: 879
- Code: S/4405 (Document)
- Subject: The Congo Question
- Voting summary: 11 voted for; None voted against; None abstained
- Result: Adopted

Security Council composition
- Permanent members: China; France; Soviet Union; United Kingdom; United States
- Non-permanent members: Argentina; Ceylon; Ecuador; Italy; Poland; Tunisia

United Nations Security Council Resolution 145 was adopted unanimously on 22 July 1960. After considering a report by the Secretary-General, Dag Hammarskjöld, regarding the implementation of Resolution 143, the Council called upon Belgium to withdrawal its troops from the Congo and authorized the Secretary-General to take all necessary action to this effect. The Council further requested all states to refrain from any action which might impede the restoration of law and order in the Congo or undermine its territorial integrity, the Council then commended the Secretary-General for his prompt action in regard to Resolution 143 along with his first report and requested further reports be made as appropriate.

== See also ==
- Congo Crisis
- Resolutions 143, 146, 157, 161 and 169
- List of United Nations Security Council Resolutions 101 to 200 (1953–1965)
