= Natural resources of Africa =

Recently discovered oil reserves have increased the importance of the commodity in African economies. Nigeria, Angola, Republic of the Congo, Equatorial Guinea, Algeria, Libya, Egypt, and South Sudan are among the largest oil producers in Africa. The United States and European countries took most of the Democratic Republic of the Congo's (DRC) oil production. Oil is provided by both continental and offshore productions. Sudan's oil exports in 2010 are estimated by the United States Department of State at US$9 billion.

Five countries dominate Africa's upstream oil production. Together they account for 85% of the continent's oil production and are, in order, from highest to lowest output: Nigeria, Libya, Algeria, Egypt and Angola. Other African oil producing countries are Gabon, the DRC, Cameroon, Tunisia, Equatorial Guinea, the Republic of the Congo, Ivory Coast, and more recently, Ghana. Exploration is taking place in a number of other countries that aim to increase their output or become first-time producers. Included in this list are Chad, Sudan, Namibia, South Africa, and Madagascar, whilst Mozambique and Tanzania are potential oil producers.

Types of Natural Resources in Africa

A notable part of Africa’s natural resources are minerals:

- crude oil, natural gas, coal and charcoal.
- gold, silver, lead, iron ore, cobalt, zinc, and manganese.
- talc, limestone.
- diamonds, amethyst, emeralds, etc.

== Oil and Mineral resources in Africa ==
Africa has 30% of the remaining mineral resources in the world. 57% of Africa's export earnings comes from hydrocarbons. From 1980 to 2012, proven oil reserves in Africa grew by 150%.

Ore resources in Africa are abundant while other continents are beginning to face depletion of resources. The copper belt in Haut-Katanga Province, the diamond mines in Sierra Leone, Angola, and Botswana are well-known for the abundance of mineral resources, albeit with a negative reputation arising from perceptions of their industries' involvement in corrupt practices, and links to violent rebel movements. The RUF (Revolutionary United Front) and the blood diamonds used to supply these rebel factions with arms is one such example.

In recent years, exploration activities have grown in West Africa. However, lack of services became a problem for exploration companies. In 2020, West Africa received the third larger budget for exploration projects. From 2009 to 2019, West Africa accounted the major success in gold discoveries. Exploration budgets in Africa fell 10% in 2020, reaching their lower levels in the last four years.

== Impact of non-African exploitation ==
With a low population density Africa has been colonized by non-African nations from the 16th century, all exploiting African resources to varying degrees. Some economists have argued this history of outside exploitation demonstrates the 'scourge of raw materials' problem. In this situation, highly sought-after, yet rare, raw resources are present in a less-developed, less-powerful entity. Such a situation places intense pressures on the original "possessors" of the resources. In African nations, these pressures, it is argued, have led to wars and slowed development. While Western nations like the United States, Canada, Australia, France and the United Kingdom, as well as emerging economic powerhouses like China, continue to exploit Africa's natural resources, the value from the natural resources goes to the West and East Asia, rather than Africa, exacerbating poverty in Africa, despite Africa's abundance of natural resources. A Guyanese historian, Walter Rodney, posits that foreign ownership of African natural resources is the "most direct way" that rich countries continue to dominate African states without formally colonizing them: "When citizens of Europe own the land and the mines of Africa, this is the most direct way of sucking the African continent."

== See also ==
- Economy of Africa
- Mineral industry of Africa
- Renewable energy in Africa
- Water scarcity in Africa
