= Chief Kanongesha =

Chief Kanongesha is a Senior Chieftainship of the Kanongesha-Lunda people in the North-Western Province of Zambia, based about 40 kilometres (25 mi) west of the district headquarters, Mwinilunga. Kanongesha is one of three Lunda Senior Chieftainships in Zambia. The current Chief serves under the mantle Mulumbi Datuuma II.

The annual Chisemwa cha Lunda ceremony held by the chief draws crowds to the district every September.
