= List of rulers of the Lunda Empire =

The following is a list of the Rulers of the Lunda Empire. The Lunda Empire was a pre-colonial Central African state centered in the Democratic Republic of the Congo whose sphere of influence stretched into Angola and Zambia. The Lunda were initially ruled by kings with the title Mwaantaangaand meaning "owners of the land". This later became "Mwaantayaav" or "Mwaant Yaav" with the rise of Mbala I Yaav.

== Mwaantaangaand of Lunda Kingdom ==
- Mwaaka (c. 1500-c. 1516)
- Yala Maaku, son of Mwaaka(c. 1516-c. 1550)
- Kunde, perhaps a double for the next ruler (c. 1550-c. 1590)
- Nkonda Matit, son of Yala Maaku (c. 1590-c. 1620)
- Lueji A'Nkonde, daughter of Nkonda Matit
- Cibind Yirung, son-in-law of Nkonda Matit (ruled c. 1620-c. 1630)
- Yaav I a Yirung (or Naweej), son of Cibind Yirung (ruled c. 1630-c. 1660)
- Yaav II a Nawej, son of Naweej (ruled c. 1660-c. 1687)

== Mwaant Yaav of Lunda Empire ==
- Mbal I Yaav, son of Yaav II (ruled c. 1687-c. 1719)
- Mukas Munying Kabalond, brother of Mbal I (ruled c. 1719-c. 1720)
- Muteb I Kat Kateng, brother of Mukas I (ruled c. 1720-c. 1748)
- Mukas Waranankong, son of Muteb I (ruled c. 1748-c. 1766)
- Naweej I Mufa Muchimbunj, of unclear pedigree (ruled c. 1766-1775)
- Cikomb Yaav Italesh, son of Yaav ya Mbanyi (ruled 1775-1800)
- Naweej II a Ditend, nephew of Cikomb (ruled 1800-1852)
- Mulaj a Namwan, nephew of Cikomb (ruled 1852-1857)
- Cakasekene Naweej, son of Mulaj a Namwan (ruled 1857)
- Muteb II a Cikomb, son of Cikomb (ruled 1857-1873)
- Mbal II a Kamong Isot, son of Naweej II (ruled 1873-1874)
- Mbumb I Muteba a Kat, nephew of Cikomb (ruled 1874-1883)
- Cimbindu a Kasang, son of Muteb II (ruled 1883-1884)
- Kangapu Naweej, son of Muteb II (ruled 1884-1885)
- Mudib, son of Naweej II (ruled 1885-1886)
- Mutand Mukaz, son of Naweej II (ruled 1886-1887)
- Mbal III a Kalong, son of Naweej II (ruled 1887)

== Mwaant Yaav under the Congo Free State ==
- Mushidi I a Nambing, son of Mbumb I (ruled 1887-1907)
- Muteb I a Kasang, son of Muteb II a Cikomb (ruled 1907-1908, in rebellion from 1898)

== Mwaant Yaav under the Belgian Congo ==
- Muteb I a Kasang cont. (ruled 1908-1920)
- Kaumbw Diur, grandson of Naweej II (ruled 1920-1951)
- Yaav a Naweej III, great-grandson of Naweej II (ruled 1951-1960)

== Mwaant Yaav under Katanga ==
- Yaav a Nawej III cont. (ruled 1960-1962)

== Mwaant Yaav under Republic of Congo ==
- Yaav a Nawej III cont. (ruled 1962-June 1963)
- Mushidi II "Lumanga" Kawel a Kamin, grandson of Mushidi I (ruled 1963-December 1965)
- Muteb II Mushid, nephew of Mushidi II (ruled 1965-1971)

== Mwaant Yaav under Zaire ==
- Muteb II Mushid cont. (ruled 1971-27 November 1973)
- Mbumb II Muteb, brother of Muteb II (ruled 1973-1984)
- Kawel II, brother of Mbumb II (ruled 1984-1997)

== Mwaant Yaav under Democratic Republic of the Congo ==
- Kawel II cont. (ruled 1997-27 January 2005)
- Mushid III, brother of Kawel II (ruled 2005-)

== See also ==
- Lunda Empire
- History of the Democratic Republic of the Congo

== Literature ==
- Duysters, Léon (1958) "Histoire des aluunda", Problèmes d'Afrique Centrale 78, pp. 75-98.
- Hoover, J. Jeffrey (1978) The seduction of Ruwej: Reconstructing Ruund history (the nuclear Lunda; Zaire, Angola, Zambia). PhD thesis, Yale University.
