= Kanyok Kingdom =

18th-century African kingdom

Kanyok was a kingdom of Luba speaking people that existed in Africa in the early 18th-century. It is somewhat related to the modern Kanyok language.

Kanyok were possibly part of a larger kingdom called Kulundwe. Oral traditions state that either Shimat Citend or his son Cibend Kadwo in the early 18th-century refused to continue to pay Kulundwe tribute and this led to Kanyok no longer recognizing rule by Kulundwe.

Around this time Kanyok forces invaded the Kingdom of Lunda and set up a fortress there. They established a strong fortress in that territory and killed Nawej, who is the first historically attested ruler of the Kingdom of Lunda.

== Sources ==
- John K. Thornton. History of West Central Africa to 1850. Cambridge University Press, 2020.
