= Eastern Lunda =

Ethnic group in Zambia and the Democratic Republic of the Congo

The Lunda people of the Luapula River valley in Zambia and DR Congo are called by others the Eastern Lunda to distinguish them from the "western" Lunda people who remained in the heartland of the former Lunda Kingdom, but they themselves would use Kazembe-Lunda or Luunda with an elongated 'u' to make that distinction. (The name 'Lunda' may also be spelled Luunda).

According to oral tradition, the Eastern Lunda migrated in the 18th century to their current area at the direction of Ng'anga Bilonda, the first Mwata Kazembe. The migration was motivated by revenge; the killer of Bilonda's father lived there, and the Eastern Lunda took over the land via conquest and royal marriages. Their neighbours in northern Zambia to whom they are allied, the Bemba, did so at the same time, and the Eastern Lunda took on the Bemba language in place of the Chilunda, their original language. Their (western) Lunda compatriots in the North-Western Province of Zambia still speak Chilunda however.

Colonial borders led to differences in the political structure of Eastern versus Western Lunda society. The Eastern Lunda in Zambia (then Northern Rhodesia) were allowed to consolidate power under the relatively indirect rule of the British, resulting in society with power concentrated in the hands of the kings.

== See also ==
- Kingdom of Lunda
