= Mwata Yamvo =

Mwata Yamvo was a 16th-century founding ruler of the Lunda Empire, and the title given to all subsequent rulers or paramount chiefs of the Lunda (or Luunda or Ruund) people to the present day. The name has variety of spellings: Mwaante Yah-mvu, Mwaant Yaav, Muata Jamvo, Mwata Yamfwa.

== See also ==
- List of Mwata Yamvo rulers
- Mwata Kazembe
