= Lunda people =

Lunda
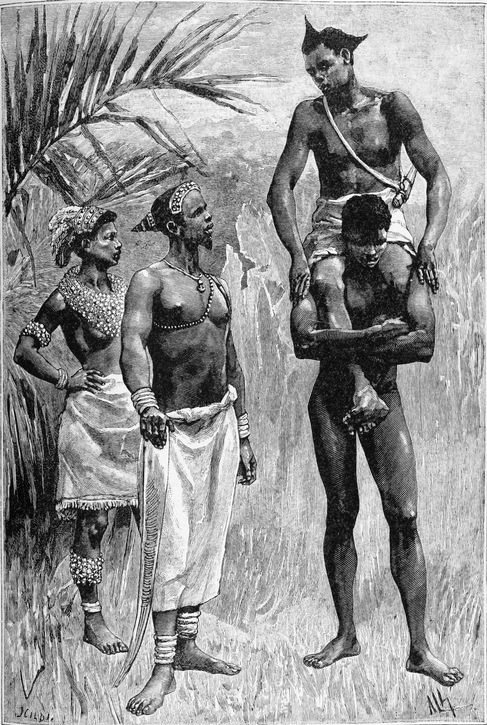
- Group of Ka-Lundas in 1909

Total population
- c. ≈1,450,000

Regions with significant populations
- Democratic Republic of the Congo: 750,000
- Angola: 500,000
- Zambia: 200,000

Languages
- Lunda, French, Swahili, English, Portuguese, Kituba

Related ethnic groups
- Chokwe, Ruund, Luba, Mbunda, Luvale, Ganguela, Songo, Luchazi, other Bantu peoples

The Lunda (Balunda, Luunda, Ruund) are a Bantu ethnic group that originated in what is now the Democratic Republic of the Congo along the Kalanyi River and formed the Kingdom of Lunda in the 17th century under their ruler, Mwata Yamvo or Mwaant Yav, with their capital at Musumba. From there they spread widely through Katanga and into eastern Angola, north-western Zambia (the Kanongesha-Lunda and the Ishindi-Lunda), Gabon, Republic of the Congo, and the Luapula Valley of Zambia (the Eastern or Kazembe-Lunda).

== History ==
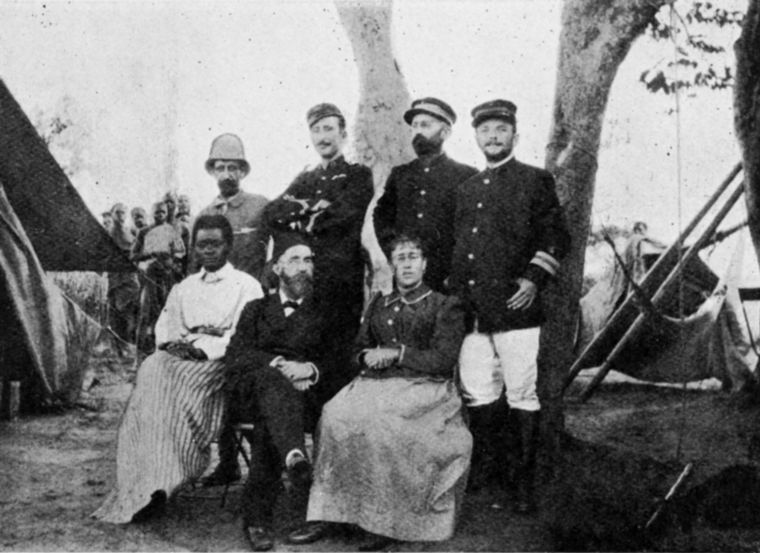
The members of the Lunda delimitation commission; also Mme. Sarmento and Mrs. Grenfell

The Lunda were allied to the Luba, and their migrations and conquests spawned a number of tribes such as the Luvale of the upper Zambezi and the Kasanje on the upper Kwango River of Angola.

The Lunda people's heartland was rich in the natural resources of rivers, lakes, forests and savannah. Its people were fishermen and farmers, and they prospered. They grew maize, millet, yams, sorghum, squash, beans, sweet potatoes, oil palms and tobacco, and were palm wine drinkers. Their traders came into contact with the Portuguese, and Arab and Swahili traders of East Africa. They played a large role in the slave and ivory trade that moved goods and people from central Africa to the coasts for export.

The people of the Lunda Kingdom believed in Nzambi or Nzamb Katang as a Supreme Creator of the world who created everything of existence on earth. Their religion did not address Nzambi directly, but through the spirits of their ancestors. Their kings had twenty to thirty wives. The Lunda captured adolescents from the peoples they defeated. These teenagers were turned into slaves and wore an iron necklace to symbolise their status. The slaves would only shed the collar when they had shown the king the severed head of one of the kingdom's enemies. After this, these former slaves were to be incorporated into Lunda society.

After 1608 Lunda people launched several attacks against the Mbundu. This provoked a war between the kingdoms Ndongo and Lunda. After the defeat of the Ndongo, Lunda people based their diet on the cows and pigs they had stolen from kingdom of Ndongo, while their income was based on the sale of Mbundu prisoners to Portuguese merchants. They subsequently became sedentary, migrated to other regions, developed a family system typical of most societies (they married and had children) and became a powerful empire that based part of its income on the sale of slaves, both on a small and large scale. The slave trade was abandoned in the 19th century when the European slave trade ceased.

== Demography ==
Today the Lunda people comprise hundreds of subgroups such as the Akosa, Imbangala and Ndembu, and number approximately 800,000 in Angola, 1.1 million in the Congo, and 600,000 in Zambia. Most speak the Lunda language, Chilunda, except for the Kazembe-Lunda who have adopted the Bemba language of their neighbours.

== Notable members ==
- Moïse Tshombe, President of the secessionist State of Katanga and later Prime Minister of the Democratic Republic of the Congo
- Mujinga Kambundji, Swiss athlete
