= Lunda Empire =

Former confederation of states

Lunda Empire Lunda
- 17th century–1887
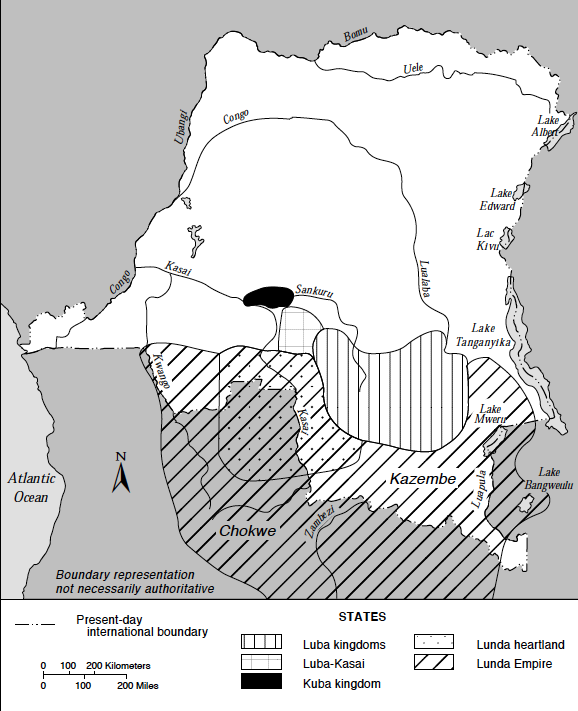
- Map of the Lunda Empire and Luba kingdoms in the Congo River Basin around 1850.
- Official languages: Chilunda
- Ethnic groups: Balunda
- Government: Monarchy
- Mwaantayaav
  - 16th century: Mwata Yamvo
- History
  - Established: 17th century
  - Disestablished: 1887
Preceded by	Succeeded by
Lunda culture	Chokwe Kingdom
- Today part of: Angola; Democratic Republic of the Congo; Zambia

The Lunda Empire or Lunda Commonwealth was a confederation or commonwealth of states in what is now the Democratic Republic of Congo, north-eastern Angola, and north-western Zambia. Its central state was in Katanga.

== Origin ==
Initially, the core of what would become the Lunda confederation was a commune called a N'Gaange in the kiLunda (kiyaka-kipunu) language. It was ruled over by a monarch called the Mwane-a- n'Gaange. One of these rulers, Ilunga Tshibinda, came from the nation of Luba where his brother ruled and married Lueji A'Nkonde, a royal woman from a nation to their south. Their son became the first paramount ruler of the Lunda, creating the title of Mwane-a-Yamvu (c. 1665).

Other sources state the first well-attested historical ruler of Lunda was Nawej, who begin his rule about 1695. His father was said to have come from Kalundwe, a Luba language-speaking state. It is unclear, though, how much of the traditions of the kingdom before Nawej are historically accurate.

Nawej is said by tradition to have created the office of queen mother, called Rukonkesh. A key part of this role was to help determine succession. He also created the office of Swan Mulond, which he gave to his mother Ruwej, and Swan Mulop, a title for the heir apparent. However these offices are only directly attested to by sources from the early 19th century.

Perpetual kingship was practised, whereby the king 'became' his predecessor, adopting his name, kinship relations, and duties. The royal centre of the empire was called musumba, where each ruler assembled their court, surrounded by a moat and earthen walls. Within the musumba were paved roads, courtyards, and areas demarcated for rituals.

== Expansion ==
Lunda started in an area where traditional farming and thus settled existence was only generally done in river valleys. Just to the north is an area where the areas between rivers can also be inhabited. In its early history Lundu struggled primarily with the Luba-speaking people who lived downriver, and thus north of it. These people are sometimes referred to with names such as Sala Mpusa or Kete, which make it appear they were organized single states. However in reality they were loose confederations of shifting alliances.

It also early on faced off with Kanyok Kingdom, located to its north-west, also a Luba-speaking kingdom, but much larger than the various populations that existed in Kete and Sala Mpusa.

The first major military campaign by Nawej was against Sala Mpasu. He is said to have built a major fortress in Sala Mpasu territory, but was not at this stage able to exert control over them. Nawej removed his troops from Sala Mpasu in response to an invasion of his territory by forces from the Kingdom of Kanyok.

The Kanyok forces killed Nawej and established a fortress in Lunda territory.

The next ruler, Muland, elected by the leaders of the state, was eventually able to drive out the Kanyok forces.

Muland is said to have resigned in favor of Nawej's son Muted. It seems to have been at this point that rule became hereditary within the descendants of Nawej.

Muted was succeeded by his nephew Yava a Nawej. One of the leading "karula" in the empire, the class who helped chose the new Emperor, Mai, was the main leader of expansion under Yava during the 1720s or so, pushing the boundary of Lunda past the Kasai River to the west. The Lulua resisted Mai's expansion. So Muteb, the son of the last unrelated ruler Muland, lead a northwest movement along the Kwilu.

== Apex ==
The Lunda Kingdom controlled some 150,000 km^{2} by 1680. The state doubled in size to around 300,000 km^{2} at its height in the 19th century. The Mwane-a Yamvo of Lunda became powerful militarily from their base of 175,000 inhabitants. Along with this military strength through sheer numbers, the Lunda Kingdom also received Muslim military advisors and some dated weapons from the cities of Nyangwe and Kabambare. Through marriage with descendants of the Luba kings, they gained political ties.

The Lunda people were able to settle and colonize other areas and tribes, thus extending their kingdom through southwest Katanga into Angola and north-western Zambia, and eastwards across Katanga into what is now the Luapula Province of Zambia. The kingdom became a confederation of a number of chieftainships that enjoyed a degree of local autonomy (as long as tributes were paid), with Mwata Yamvo as paramount ruler and a ruling council (following the Luba model) to assist with administration.

The strength of the kingdom enabled it to conquer the territory of other tribes, especially to the east. In the 18th century, a number of migrations took place as far as the region to the south of Lake Tanganyika. The Bemba people of Northern Zambia descended from Luba migrants who arrived in Zambia throughout the 17th century. At the same time, a Lunda chief and warrior called Mwata Kazembe set up an Eastern Lunda kingdom in the valley of the Luapula River.

== Collapse ==
The kingdom of Lunda came to an end in the 19th century, when it was invaded by the Chokwe, who were armed with guns. The Chokwe then established their own kingdom with their language and customs. Lunda chiefs and people continued to live in the Lunda heartland but were diminished in power.

At the start of the colonial era (1884), the Lunda heartland was divided between Portuguese Angola, King Leopold II of Belgium's Congo Free State and the British in North-Western Rhodesia, which became Angola, DR Congo and Zambia, respectively. The Lunda groups in Northern Rhodesia were led by two prominent chiefs, Ishindi and Kazembe Kazembi, with Ishindi establishing his kingdom in the north-west of the country and Kazembe in the north-east. Of the two prominent chiefs, Ishindi was the first born of Mwanta Yamvo and Kazembe was made King as a result of reward for his loyalty to Mwanta Yamvo.

== See also ==
- List of rulers of the Lunda Empire
- Luba Empire
- Lozi Kingdom
- Bushi Kingdom

== Sources ==
- Thornton, John (1998). Africa and Africans in the Making of the Atlantic World, 1400-1800 (Second ed.). Cambridge: Cambridge University Press. p. 340 Pages. ISBN 0-521-62724-9.
