= Lunda language =

Bantu language spoken in Central and Southern Africa

Lunda
- Chilunda
- Native to: Zambia, Angola, Democratic Republic of the Congo
- Ethnicity: Lunda people
- Native speakers: (600,000 in Zambia and Angola 800.000 cited 2001–2023); 1.1 million in Congo
- Language family: Niger–Congo?: Atlantic–Congo; Volta-Congo; Benue–Congo; Bantoid; Southern Bantoid; Bantu (Zone L); Lunda languages (L.50); Lunda
- Writing system: Latin (Lunda alphabet); Lunda Braille

Official status
- Recognised minority language in: Zambia

Language codes
- ISO 639-2: lun
- ISO 639-3: lun
- Glottolog: lund1266
- Guthrie code: L.52

Lunda, also known as Chilunda, is a Bantu language spoken in Zambia, Angola, and, to a lesser extent, in the Democratic Republic of the Congo (DRC). Lunda and its dialects are spoken and understood by perhaps 8.6% of Zambians (1986 estimate), and the language is used mainly in the Northwestern province of Zambia. The majority of the Lunda can be found in DRC, especially Katanga Province, as well as in Angola. A small number of Lunda dialects are represented in Namibia.

== Phonology ==
=== Vowels ===
	Front	Central	Back
Close	i iː		u uː
Mid	e eː		o oː
Open		a aː	

Vowel length is contrastive.

=== Consonants ===
		Labial	Alveolar	Palatal	Velar	Glottal
Nasal		m	n	ɲ	ŋ	
Plosive/ Affricate	voiceless	p	t	tʃ	k	
Plosive/ Affricate	voiced	b	d	dʒ	ɡ	
Fricative	voiceless	f	s	ʃ		h
Fricative	voiced	v	z	ʒ		
Approximant		w	l	j		

/w/ may also be heard as a bilabial glide [β̞].
