= Shinga =

Shinga may refer to:

== Places ==
- Shinga Deuxième a village in East Kasai in the Democratic Republic of the Congo
- Shinga, DR Congo a village in Katanga Province of the Democratic Republic of the Congo
- Shienga, a village, also known as Shinga, in the Northern Region of Ghana
- Shinga, Jigawa State, a town in Jigawa State, Nigeria
- Shinga, Gombe State, a town in Gombe State, Nigeria
- Shinga, Peru, a village in Departamento de Huanuco, Peru
- Shinga, Zimbabwe, a village in Mashonaland East Province, Zimbabwe

== Other ==
- For the fictional underground creature created by Terry Goodkind and called a shinga, see The Sword of Truth
