= Holoholo people =

Ethnic group from Kigoma Region, Tanzania

Holoholo
Regions with significant populations
- Tanzania: 12,500
- DRC: 28,000

Languages
- Holoholo language

Religion
- Majority: Islam; Minority: African Traditional Religion and Christianity

Related ethnic groups
- Luba & other Bantu peoples

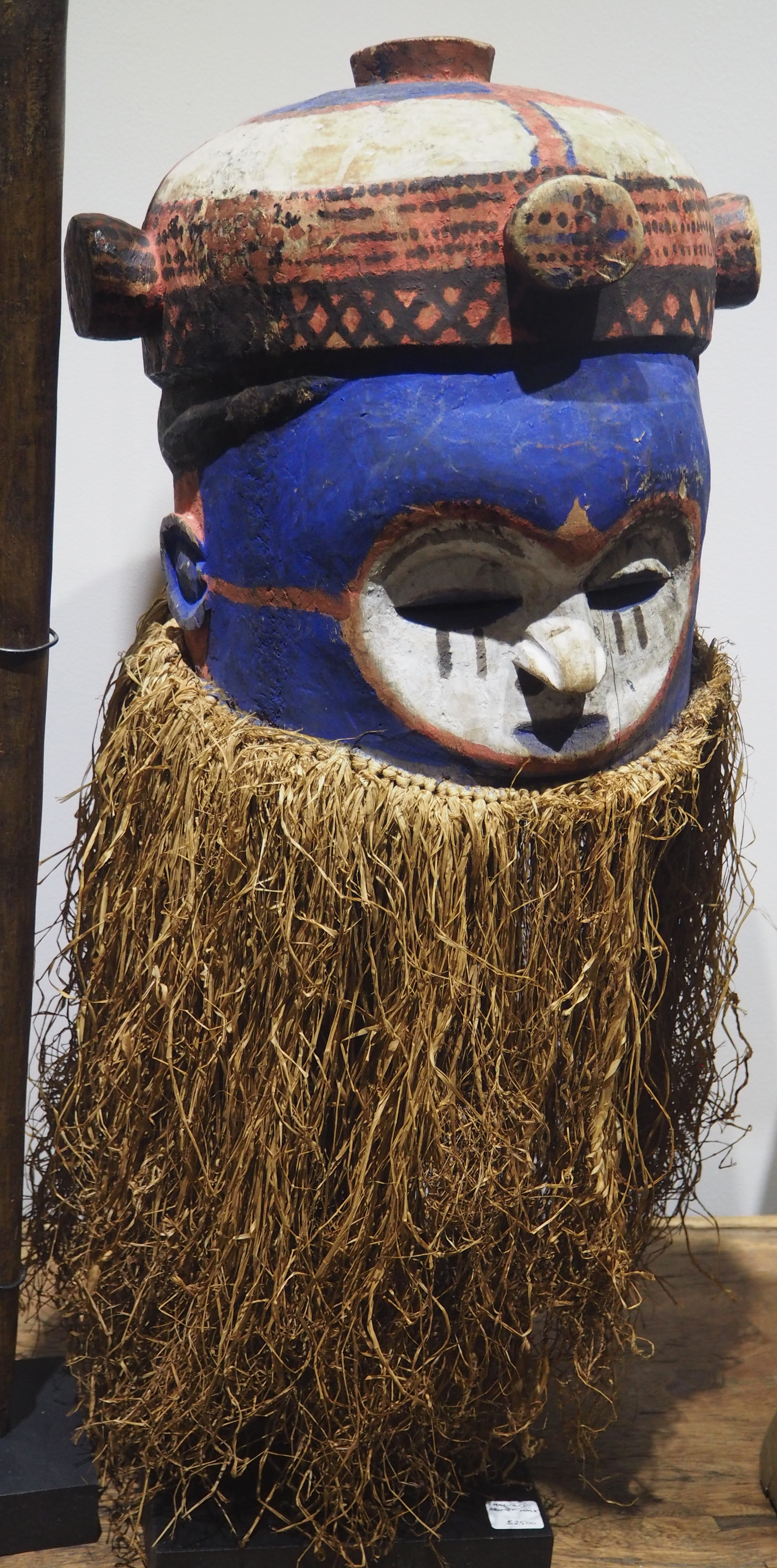
P3222033a Polychrome helmet mask, Holoholo, Tanzania (33453396351)

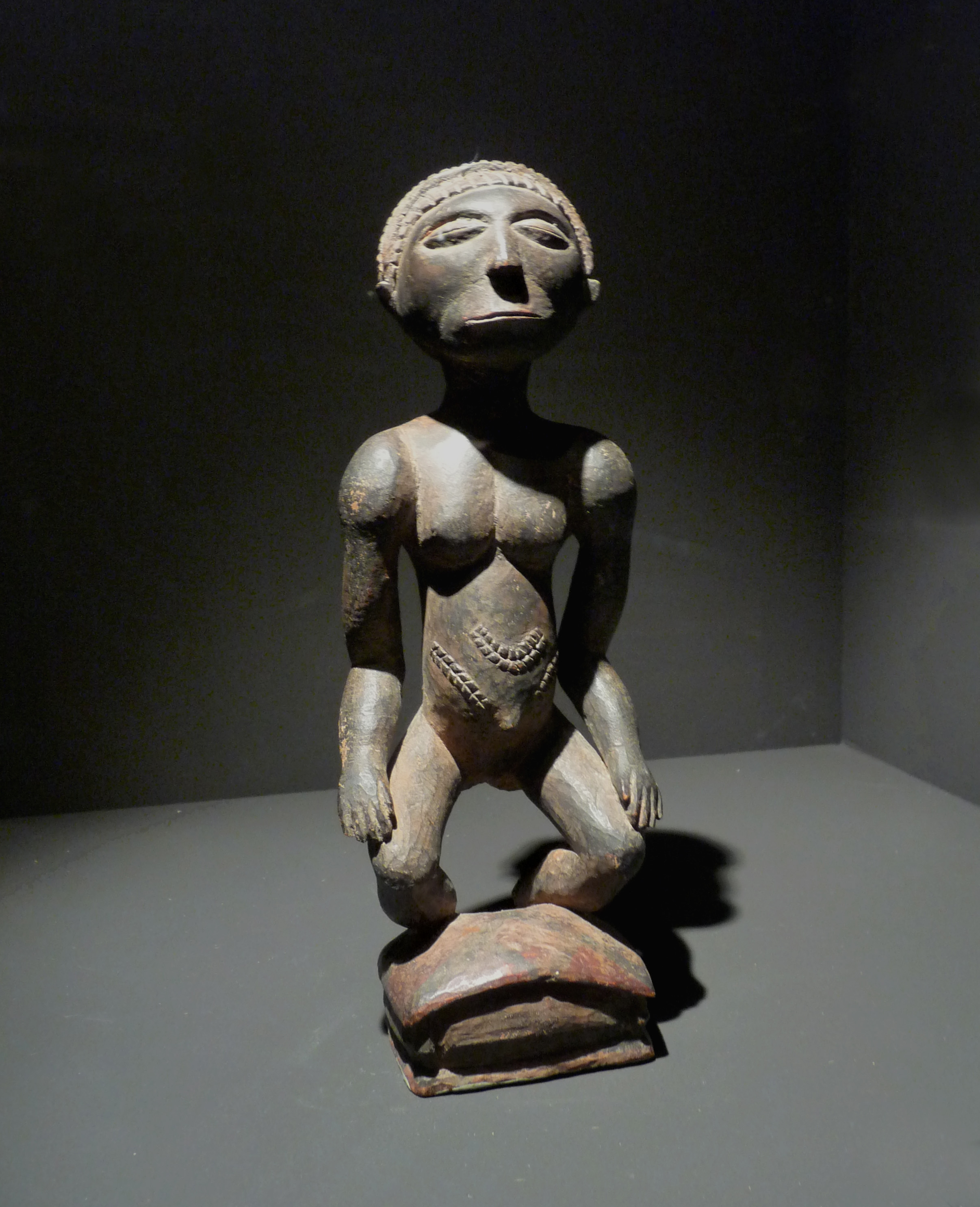
Holoholo statuette of a woman from the 19th century or early 20th century

The Holoholo also known as Kalanga (Wakalanga in Swahili) are a Bantu ethnic group that inhabit the shores of central lake Tanganyika. The majority of them live near Kalemie city on Lake Tanganyika in Tanganyika Province of the Democratic Republic of the Congo, and on the opposite shore of the lake in Uvinza District of Kigoma Region in Tanzania.

== Language ==
As of 2002, there were about 15,500 speakers of the Holoholo language. The name "Holoholo" was given to them by the Belgians. It comes from the sound of their greeting, which outsiders found comical. The alternative name "Kalanga" simply means people who were there before the current population.

== History ==
The Holoholo are a matrilineal people. They are descendants of Baguha people who fled from the Luba Empire when it was expanding eastward in the 18th century, settling around Kalemie where the Lukuga River leaves the lake. During the period of Luba dominance that followed the eastward expansion under Luba king Ilunga Sungu around 1800, bambudye secret societies were introduced among the Holoholo and other peoples, propagating oral traditions of the Luba royal family. The Holoholo adopted and adapted the Luba genesis myth, in which they believed there was a mountain called Ilunga Sungu on the west side of the Lualaba towards the Luba heartland, This refers to the location of the court of Ilunga Sungu at Katende.

The 1935 book Les peuplades du Congo belge shows the Holoholo living on both sides of the Lukuga. They became middlemen in the Arab and African slave trade. With the suppression of this trade, the economy collapsed and disease and local warfare decimated the population. Today the economy is mostly agricultural-based on sorghum, maize, peanuts, and beans. Fish are caught with nets, dried and sold locally, the main source of cash in the area. Sorghum is used to make beer.

The Holoholo who live in Tanzania around Kungwe Mountain has a tradition that their ancestors came from the Congo side by means of a long island that continued Kungwe Mountain into the lake. The lake level is highly variable, so it is conceivable that they crossed at a time when it was much lower than today when part of the ridge separating the northern and southern basins of the lake would have been exposed.

Thousands of Holoholo had settled along the Tanganyikan side of the lake by 1915, having sailed over in canoes. A census in 1948 counted 4,410 Holoholo in Tanganyika.

In 1987 the Holoholo people had an estimated population of 12,500 in Tanzania. They traditionally lived in the Mahale Mountains on the east shore of the lake opposite Kalemie. However, they were expelled from this area after 1979 to make way for the Mahale Mountains National Park created in 1985.

== Sources ==
- Clark, John Desmond (1969). Kalambo Falls prehistoric site, Volume 1. CUP Archive.
- Finke, Jens (2002). Rough guide to Tanzania. Rough Guides. ISBN 1-85828-783-9.
- Foden, Giles (2006). Mimi and Toutou's Big Adventure: The Bizarre Battle of Lake Tanganyika. Random House Digital, Inc. ISBN 1-4000-7526-2.
- "Holoholo Information". University of Iowa. 3 November 1998. Archived from the original on 11 January 2012.
- "Holoholo A language of Democratic Republic of the Congo". Ethnologue.
- Roberts, Allen F. (1991). "History, Ethnicity, and Change in the Christian Kingdom of Southeastern Zaire". In Leroy Vail (ed.). The Creation of Tribalism in Southern Africa. University of California Press. ISBN 0-520-07420-3.
- Reefe, Thomas Q. (1981). The rainbow and the kings: a history of the Luba Empire to 1891. University of California Press. ISBN 0-520-04140-2.
