= Albert Kalonji =

Congolese politician (1929–2015)

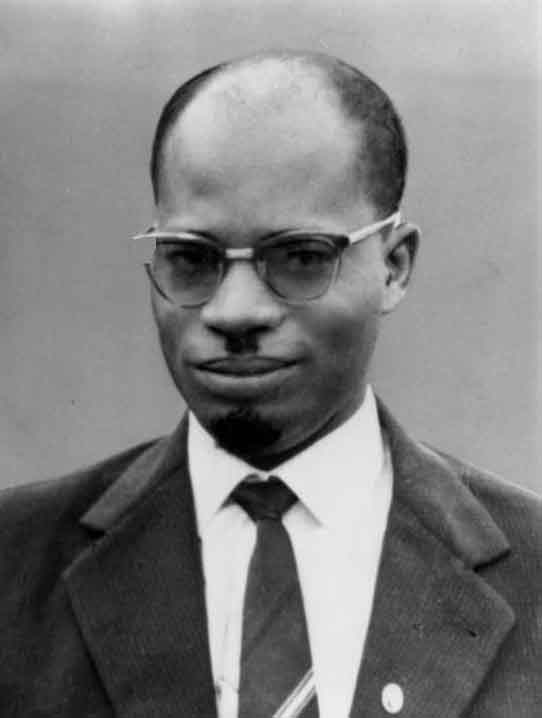
- Portrait, c. 1960

Mulopwe / Emperor of the Baluba Head of State of South Kasai (first as President, later as King)
- In office 9 August 1960 – 5 October 1962
- Preceded by: Edmond Mukanya Mulenda
- Succeeded by: Kalo Kalonji Ditunga

Personal details
- Born: Albert Kalonji; 6 June 1929 Hemptinne (near Luluabourg), Belgian Congo
- Died: 20 April 2015 (aged 85) Mbuji-Mayi, Democratic Republic of the Congo
- Party: Mouvement National Congolais-Kalonji (MNC-K)

Albert Kalonji (6 June 1929 – 20 April 2015) was a Congolese politician and businessman from the Luba ya Kasai nobility. He was elected king/emperor (mulopwe) of the Baluba ya Kasai (Bambo) and for most of 1961 styled himself Albert I of South Kasai.

Co-founder, along with Patrice Lumumba, of the Congolese National Movement (MNC), he campaigned with him for the independence of the Congo. Internal disagreements led to the split of the MNC into two branches, known as MNC-Lumumba and MNC-Kalonji. In 1960, Kalonji was elected emperor of the Lubas and head of state of South Kasai by the nobility the ministers and the Kasaian people. Kalonji was crowned by the church and the Luba tribe on 12 April 1961. This de facto independence lasted until September 1962.

== Early life ==
Albert Kalonji was born on 6 June 1929, in Hemptinne Saint-Benoît (currently Bunkonde) near present-day Kananga. He attended Scheut Missionaries-run Catholic schools in Lusambo before studying at an agricultural school in Kisantu for five years. He graduated as an agricultural assistant in 1948. In 1951, he was hired by the colony as an agricultural assistant and later became an accountant for the Luluabourg tribunal.

In 1957, he joined the Provincial Council of Kasai. He was invited to Brussels for the 1958 World's Fair and joined the Congolese National Movement that same year. In 1959, he opened a tax office in Kasai and became a member of the Legislative Council. In August 1959, he was convicted of "inciting racial hatred" (conflict between Lulua and Baluba) and was exiled to Kole, but was later released. Later that year, he was elected president of the MNC-Kalonji.

In 1960, he participated in the Belgo-Congolese Round Table Conference. Elected national deputy in June, he was considered for a ministerial position but was excluded by Patrice Lumumba. In August, he became president of the autonomous State of South Kasai. Proclaimed "king of South Kasai" (under the name Albert I) in 1961, he dissolved the government and adopted the title of Mulopwe (emperor) of the "Federated Kingdom of South Kasai." to preserve the cultural heritage of his people (Luba people).

In September 1962, Albert Kalonji was overthrown in a military coup instigated by his prime minister, Joseph Ngalula. He then went into exile in Spain for 18 months. He served as a minister from 1964 to 1965 under Moïse Tshombe, leaving the government shortly before Mobutu's coup.

In 1980, he joined Mobutu's single party, the Popular Movement of the Revolution. In 2008, the Baluba of Kasai honored him on his 80th birthday. Albert Kalonji died on 20 April 2015, in Mbuji-Mayi, at the age of 85. He was buried in the village of Katende (Miabi Territory).

== Early career ==
Kalonji, a chief from the Luba ethnic group, began his political career under Belgian colonial rule as a member of the nationalist Mouvement National Congolais (MNC) party led by Patrice Lumumba. Kalonji, however, split with Lumumba to form a federalist faction of the party, known as the Mouvement National Congolais-Kalonji (MNC-K), which failed to achieve significant success while Lumumba was made Prime Minister of the independent Congo in 1960.

== South Kasai ==
Within days of being independent from Belgium, the new Republic of the Congo (Note: Not to be confused with the neighboring country of the same name, sometimes known as Congo-Brazzaville.) found itself torn between competing political factions, as well as by foreign interference. As the situation deteriorated, Moise Tshombe declared the independence of Katanga Province as the State of Katanga on 11 July 1960.

Kalonji, claiming that the Baluba (Note: In most Bantu languages, the prefix ba- (or sometimes wa-) is added to a human noun to form a plural. As such, Baluba refers collectively to members of the Luba ethnic group.) were being persecuted in the Congo and needed their own state in their traditional Kasai homeland, followed suit shortly afterwards and declared the autonomy of the diamond-rich South Kasai on 8 August, with himself as head. Unlike Tshombe, Kalonji shrank from declaring full independence from the Congo and rather declared its "autonomy" with a hypothetical, federalised Congo. He, as representatives of his party, continued to sit in the Congolese parliaments in Léopoldville.

In emulation of Winston Churchill, he adopted the V sign for victory to express his confidence in South Kasai's ability to achieve its goals.

On 12 April 1961, Kalonji's father, Edmond Mukanya Mulenda, was granted the title Mulopwe (which roughly translates to "emperor" or "god-king"), but he immediately "abdicated" in favour of his son. On 16 July, In April 1961, Kalonji took the royal title Mulopwe ("King of the Baluba") to tie the state more closely to the pre-colonial Luba Empire. The act divided the South Kasaian authorities and Kalonji was disavowed by the majority of South Kasai's parliamentary representatives in Léopoldville.[d] The move was controversial with members of Kalonji's own party and cost him much support.

Kalonji's reign, however, proved to be short-lived. As preparation for the invasion of Katanga, Congolese government troops invaded and occupied South Kasai, becoming involved in ethnic-based violence and displacing thousands of Baluba. On 30 December, Kalonji was arrested. He managed to escape shortly afterwards. The administrative apparatus of South Kasai survived, under Congolese occupation, until a coup d'état was led against Kalonjists by the state's Prime Minister, Joseph Ngalula, in October 1962 when the state returned to the Congo.

== Legacy and subsequent activities ==
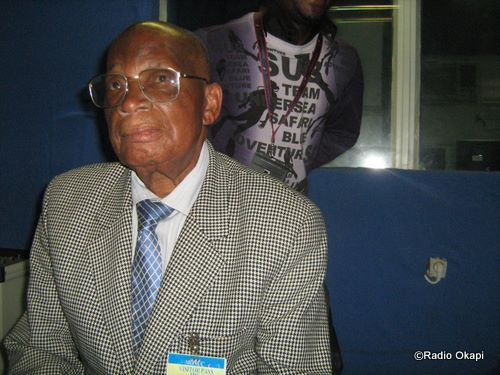
Kalonji Ditunga at a later age, 2010

Escaping from arrest, Kalonji fled to Francoist Spain. He returned to the Congo between 1964-65 to hold a ministerial portfolio in the central government led by Tshombe but returned to exile following Joseph-Désiré Mobutu's 1965 coup d'état, which ended his political career. Under Mobutu, the territory of South Kasai was divided into two regions to discourage future secessionist tendencies.

In exile in Pétange, Luxembourg, reportedly thanks to his relationship with mining executive Gérard Cravatte, Kalonji still claimed the title Souverain Possesseur des Terres occupées par les Balubas (Sovereign Owner of the Lands occupied by the Baluba). He wrote about his experiences in Memorandum: Ma lutte, au Kasai, pour la Verité au service de la Justice ("Memorandum: My fight in Kasai in the Service of Truth and Justice", published 1964) and Congo 1960. La Sécession du Sud-Kasaï. La vérité du Mulopwe ("Congo 1960. The South Kasai Secession. Truth from the Mulopwe", published 2005). He died in April 2015 and was buried in Katende.

== Bibliography ==
- Akyeampong, Emmanuel Kwaku; Gates, Henry Louis, eds. (2012). Dictionary of African Biography. Vol. 3. New York: Oxford University Press USA. ISBN 978-0-19-538207-5.
