= Lukuga River =

River in Democratic Republic of the Congo

Coordinates: 5.66667°S 26.91667°E

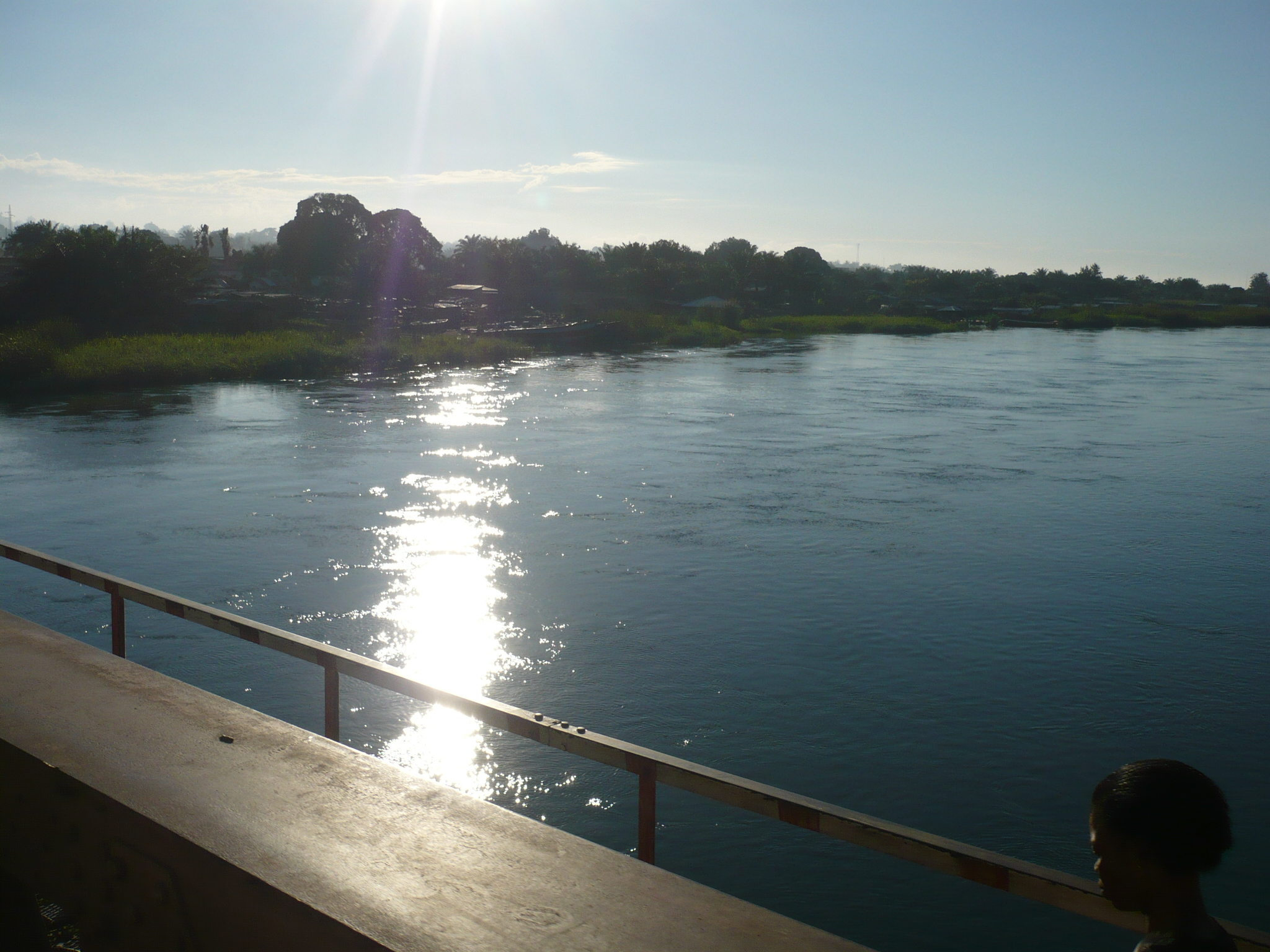
- River Lukuga from the bridge in Kalemie

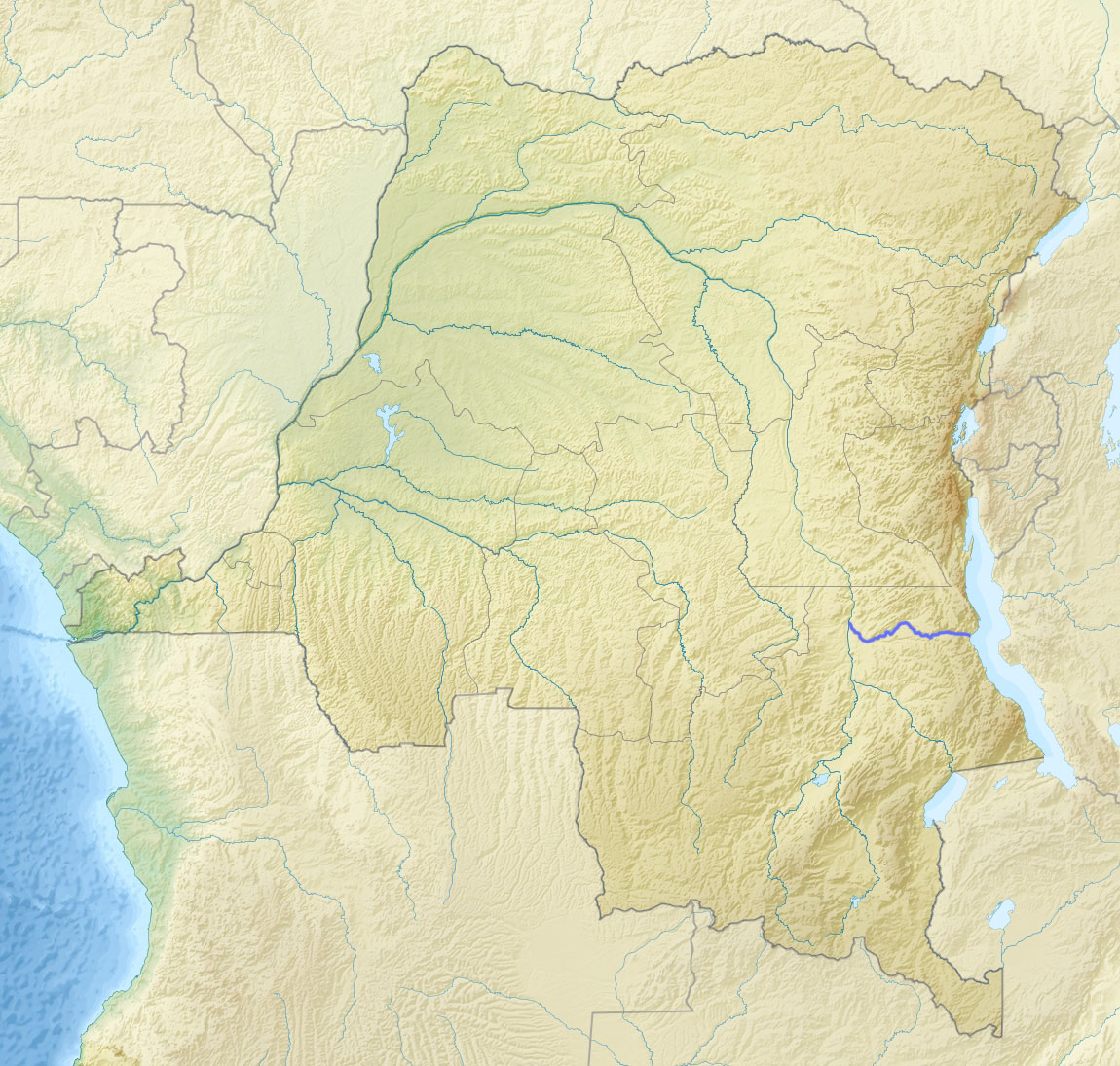
- The Lukuga River, in dark blue

Location
- Country: Democratic Republic of the Congo

Physical characteristics
- Source
  - location: Kalemie
  - elevation: 2,800 ft (850 m)
- Mouth
  - location: Lualaba River
- Length: 320 km (200 mi)
- Basin size: 244,500 km^{2} (94,400 sq mi)

The Lukuga River (Swahili: Mto Lukuga) is a tributary of the Lualaba River in the Democratic Republic of the Congo (DRC) that drains Lake Tanganyika. It is unusual in that its flow varies not just seasonally but also due to longer term climate fluctuations.

== Location ==
The Lukuga runs along the northern edge of the Katanga Plateau. The river leaves Lake Tanganyika at Kalemie and flows through a gap in the highlands westward through Tanganyika Province to join the Lualaba between Kabalo and Kongolo. Typically the river accounts for 18% of water loss from the lake, with the rest being due to evaporation. The Lukuga is heavily mineralized. The proportions of ionic contents where the Lukuga River leaves the lake, with magnesium and potassium more prevalent than calcium and sodium, are caused by the Albertine Rift's hydrothermal inputs, as seen also at the outlets of Lake Kivu and Lake Edward.

It seems likely that the present hydrological system was established quite recently when the still-active Virunga volcanoes erupted and blocked the northward flow of water from Lake Kivu into Lake Edward, causing it instead to discharge southward into Lake Tanganyika through the Ruzizi River. Before that, Lake Tanganyika, or separate sub-basins in what is now the lake, may have had no outlet other than evaporation.

The Lukuga is of considerable interest to hydrologists, since the volume of water it carries from the lake varies considerably from time to time. The river flow is greatest in May and least in November, corresponding to seasonal fluctuations in the lake level. The river is highly sensitive to longer-term climate variations, such as the Neolithic Subpluvial around 4000 BC. Since 1965 the outflow has tended to increase, although the total outflow of the Congo has been declining.

The Lukuga has formed relatively recently, providing a route through which aquatic species of the Congo Basin could colonize Lake Tanganyika. The river is home to hippopotamus and crocodiles. There are low-grade coal deposits along the river's tributaries north of Kalemie and Moluba.

== Early years ==
The Lukuga in the north, Lake Tanganyika, the Luvua River to the south and the Lualaba form a territory that was once occupied by the Hemba people in the western part and the Tumbwe people in the more mountainous east. Kasangas of the Tumbwe lineage ruled various small states in this region. The lower Lukuga and the Lualaba were natural lines of communication, and the river valleys were densely populated. Around 1800, in the second half of the rule of the Luba Emperor Ilunga Sungu, Luba forces launched raids over the Lualaba that at one point reached as far as Kalemie. Some of the Luba settled in the region, and the people around Kalemie were subject to the Luba in the following reigns of Kumwimbe Ngombe and Ilunga Kabale.

The Luba evolved the concept of the "fire king" to rule the peripheral areas of their empire such as the Luvua-Lukuga corridor, with the local ruler being a near-equal of the Luba emperor, sending only occasional tributes. The bamdudye and bakasandji secret societies were introduced into the area, providing genesis myths that helped legitimize the fire kings' position. These myths had been adopted and adapted by the Holoholo people of Kalemie by the late nineteenth century. The Hemba state of Kyombo Mkubwa became the main client state of the Luba Empire. However, by the time Europeans started to penetrate the region, Msiri's son Simbi, advancing from the south and forming alliances with the Hemba rulers against incursions from Tippu Tip, had detached Kyombo Mkubwa from the Luba heartland.

== European contacts ==
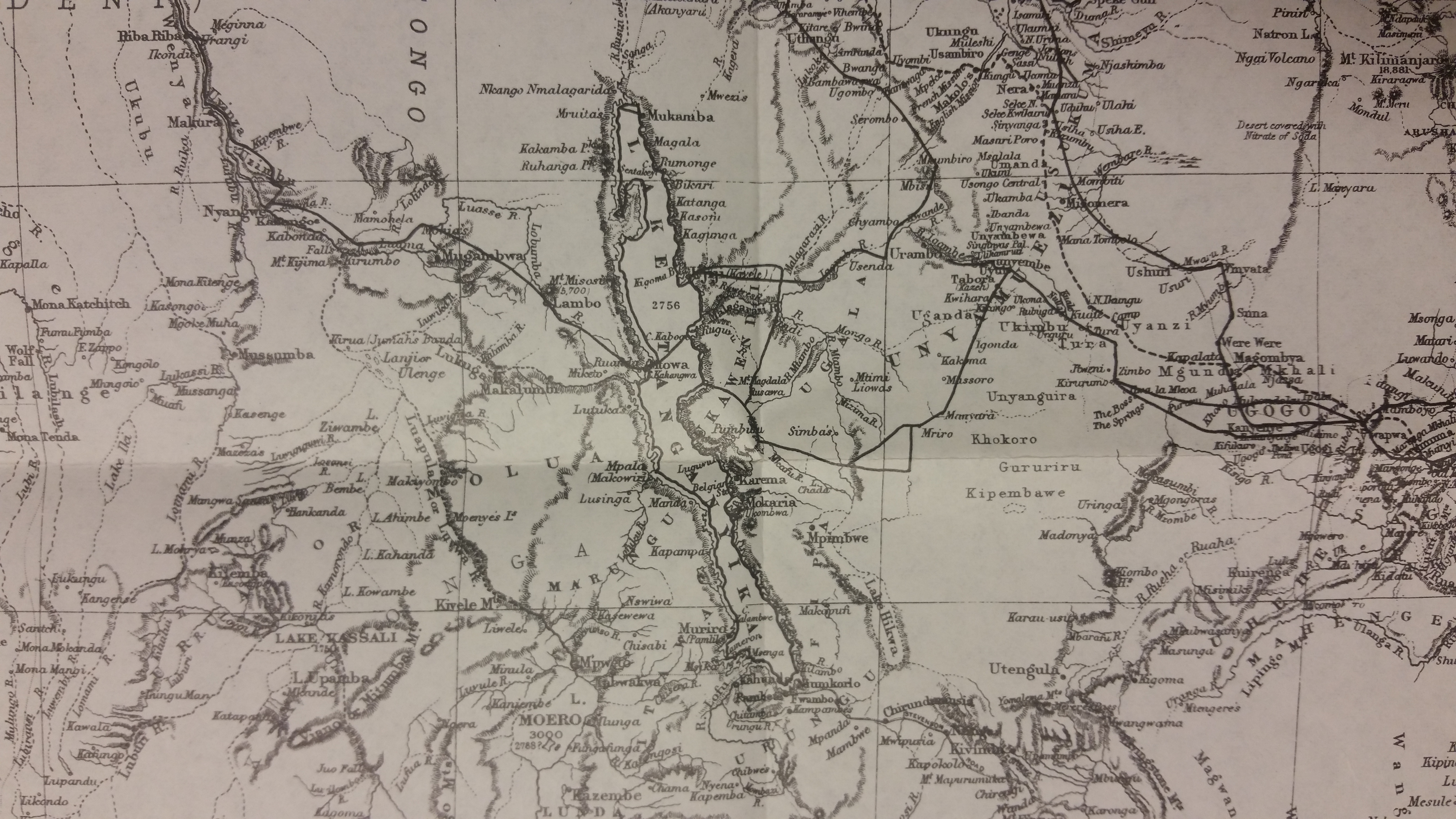
The black line indicates Stanley's route.

Around 1871 David Livingstone noticed the break in the hills through which the "Logumba" passed, and suggested that the river might be an outlet of Lake Tanganyika, and that there could be other outlets further north. Verney Lovett Cameron reached the river at the point where it left the lake in May 1874 on his journey across Africa from east to west. He confirmed that it was the only outlet of Lake Tanganyika, but was unable to get a guide to accompany him down the river to verify that it flowed into the Lualaba. In 1876 Henry Morton Stanley visited the lake. When he arrived, the lake level was low and he described the Lukuga as no more than a large creek extending westward for a great distance. However, he agreed that as the lake level rose the Lukuga would act as an outlet. It seems that a sandbar had formed across the river mouth, and the river had silted behind the bar.

In 1879 Joseph Thomson came to Kasenge from Pambete, travelling through very rough country. He found that the Lukuga creek was a large and fast-flowing river. He followed the course of the river for a few days, but hostile inhabitants of the region blocked his further explorations. When Hermann von Wissmann reached the river in 1882 he found that the river had become a fast and wide effluent. He also noted that the lake level was 4.8 m (16 ft) below the highest watermark.

== Today ==
As of 2008, the Lukuga was highly polluted at the point where it entered the Lualaba. In December 2010 the well-known South African kayaker and explorer Hendrik Coetzee was dragged out of his kayak on the Lukuga and killed by a crocodile.

== Sources ==
- Blackwood (1877). "Twenty Years of African Travel". Blackwood's Edinburgh Magazine. 121. William Blackwood.
- Blaes, X. (October 2008). "Découpage administratif de la République Démocratique du Congo" (PDF). PNUD-SIG. Archived from the original (PDF) on 2010-04-01.
- Burke, Edmund (1881). The Annual register of world events: a review of the year, Volume 122. Longmans, Green.
- Cameron, Verney Lovett (1876). "Sketch of a Journey Across Africa Part II". The living age. Vol. 130. The Living Age Co. Inc.
- Clark, John Desmond (1969). Kalambo Falls prehistoric site, Volume 1. CUP Archive.
- Davies, Bryan Robert; Walker, Keith F. (1986). The Ecology of river systems. Springer. ISBN 90-6193-540-7.
- Gupta, Avijit (2008). Large Rivers: Geomorphology and Management. John Wiley & Sons. ISBN 978-0-470-72371-5.
- Hughes, R. H.; Hughes, J. S. (1992). A directory of African wetlands. IUCN. ISBN 2-88032-949-3.
- Inbar, Michael (2010-12-21). "Horror in the Congo: Croc attack kills legendary guide". MSNBC. Archived from the original on 2011-05-14.
- Jack (1887). THE GAZETTEER OF THE WORLD. Thomas C. Jack.
- Kisangani, Emizet F.; Bobb, F. Scott (2010). "Lukuga River". Historical Dictionary of the Democratic Republic of the Congo. Scarecrow Press. ISBN 978-0-8108-5761-2.
- Klerkx, J.; Imanackunov, Beishen (2003). Lake Issyk-Kul: its natural environment. Springer. ISBN 1-4020-0900-3.
- Likens, Gene E. (2010). River ecosystem ecology: a global perspective : a derivative of Encyclopedia of inland waters. Academic Press. ISBN 978-0-12-381998-7.
- Moore (1878). "African Exploration". Friends' Intelligencer. 34. Wm. W. Moore.
- O'Brien, Gerard (2008). A Mighty Big River. Lulu.com. ISBN 978-1-4092-1802-9.
- Reefe, Thomas Q. (1981). The rainbow and the kings: a history of the Luba Empire to 1891. University of California Press. ISBN 0-520-04140-2.
