= List of rulers of Luba =

The Kingdom of Luba (1585–1889) which emerged in the marshy grasslands of the Upemba Depression in what is now southern Congo around 1585, initially began as a kingdom. Over time, through a combination of conquests, strategic marriages, and alliances, it expanded its territory and influence, eventually becoming an empire. This growth in territory and power allowed the Luba state to elevate its status from a kingdom to an empire.

The following is a list of the Mulopwe (Emperor) of Luba:

Tenure	Incumbent	Notes
1585	Foundation of the Luba kingdom	
c. 1585 to c. 1620	Kongolo, muLopwe	A powerful warrior who subjugated several local chiefdoms and created the first Luba empire.
c. 1620 to c. 1640	Ilunga Kalala, muLopwe	Son of Kongolo. He was a great warrior who extended the Luba kingdom. This caused Kongolo to become jealous and he attempted to have Kalala killed, but failed. Kalala defeated his father Kongolo in war and founded the second Luba empire in c. 1620.
c. 1640 to c. 1650	Kasongo Mwine Kibanza, muLopwe	
c. 1650 to c. 1670	Ngoi Sanza, muLopwe	
c. 1670 to c. 1685	Kasongo Kabundulu, muLopwe	
c. 1685 to c. 1700	Kumwimba, muLopwe	
c. 1700 to c. 1715	Kasongo Bonswe, muLopwe	
c. 1715 to c. 1740	Mwine Kombe Dai, muLopwe	
c. 1740 to c. 1742	Kadilo, muLopwe	
c. 1742 to c. 1749	Kekenya, muLopwe	
c. 1749 to c. 1769	Kaumbo, muLopwe	
c. 1769 to c. 1780	Miketo or Nkongolo Mwamba, muLopwe	
c. 1780 to 1809	Ilunga Sunga or Ilunga Maniema Nsungu, muLopwe	
c. 1800 to ????	Kasongo Mukaya, muLopwe	In rebellion
1809 to 1837	Kumwimba Ngombe, muLopwe	
1837	Ndai Mujinga or Ndaye Muzinga, muLopwe	Usurper
1837 to 1864	Ilunga Kabale, muLopwe	
1864 to 1865	Muloba or Maloba Konkola, muLopwe	
1865 to 1869	Kitamba, muLopwe	
1869 to 1886	Kasongo a Kalombo, muLopwe	
1886 to 1889	Nday a Mande, muLopwe	
Division into two royal lineages
Kasongo Lineage
1889 to October 1917	Kasong'wa Nyembo, muLopwe	
1917 to 1935	Umpafu Ilunga Kumwimba, muLopwe	
1935 to 1957	Ilunga Kisuku, muLopwe	
1957 to 1964	Kasongo wa Nyembo, muLopwe	
1964 to 1964	Kisula Ngoy, muLopwe	
Kabongo Lineage
1942	Maniema Nilemba Boniface , muLopwe	
1948	Maniema Boniface Kalowa, muLopwe (Ilunga Balowa Boniface) (Dibwe Kalowa Boniface)	
October 1960 to c1980	Kabongo Maniema Dibwe, muLopwe	
c1980 to 2000s?	Kumwimba Kabongo Kansh'imbu, muLopwe	
House of South-Kasai
1959-2015	Albert I (Albert Kalonji Ditunga) Mulopwe La photo montre l'Empereur Luba Albert Ier lors de son intronisation en tant que Mulopwe du peuple Luba. Debout, en costume et couronné, il est entouré de dignitaires Luba et de fonctionnaires. La noblesse Luba, agenouillée devant lui. Luba Emperor Albert Kalonji during his enthronement as Mulopwe of the Baluba. Wearing a headdress and holding a ax, he is seated on a throne surrounded by a large crowd. This solemn scene illustrates a key moment in Luba culture.	His Imperial Majesty Emperor Albert I: The first elected Luba Emperor, Albert I, was elected Mulopwe by the Luba nobility and notables in March 1959. In 1960, Albert Kalonji member of the Luba nobility and heir to clan-Chief Edmond Mukanya became President of the Luba State of South-Kasai. A year later, in 1961, the nobility and his government voted to have the autonomous state become a federated monarchy. Albert I then became the first constitutional monarch in Luba history. Albert is also remembered as one of the fathers of the Congolese independence he died in 2015. members of his direct and extended family currently live in the DRC, Belgium and Luxemburg. Mulopwe Albert 1 "Ditunga"

== See also ==
- Congo, Democratic Republic of the
  - Presidents of the Democratic Republic of the Congo
  - Heads of government of the Democratic Republic of the Congo
  - Heads of state of the Congo Free State
  - Colonial heads of Congo
    - Rulers of Kuba
    - Rulers of Ruund (Luunda)
    - Rulers of Kasongo Luunda (Yaka)
    - Rulers of Kongo
- Congo, Republic of the
  - Presidents of the Republic of the Congo
