= Katende =

Village of the Kingdom of Luba (DR Congo)

Coordinates: 7.527022°S 25.264306°E

Katende, or Sungu-Katende, was a royal sacred village of the Kingdom of Luba. It was adjacent to the village of Kabondo. Katende is on the upper Lomami in the Lualaba region in the Democratic Republic of the Congo.

After gaining power around 1770, Ilunga Sungu established his court at Katende, southwest of Lake Boya and 25 kilometres (16 mi) to the west of the Mashyo salt district of the Luba heartland. Previously the Luba kings had built their palaces northeast of Lake Boya, but the move to Katende set a precedent for locating the capital near the Mashyo resource that was followed by Ilunga Sungu's successors.

According to legend, late in the reign of Mulopwe Ilunga Sungu (c. 1770 - c. 1810) the town had become so large that the "Lord of Hygiene" could not keep the streets clear of refuse and excrement, even working all day with the help of his sons and relatives. The old king complained, blaming the Bene Kanyoka, and said they should take their dirt home with them. The Kanyok went back to their home in the west and never paid tribute to the Luba again. The story refers to the break that occurred between the Luba and Kanyok people at this time. Ilunga Sungu died at Katende and was buried there.

== Sources ==
- Reefe, Thomas Q. (1981). The rainbow and the kings: a history of the Luba Empire to 1891. University of California Press. ISBN 0-520-04140-2.
- Yoder, John C. (2002). The Kanyok of Zaire: An Institutional and Ideological History to 1895. Cambridge University Press. ISBN 0-521-52310-9.
