= Tanganyika Province =

Province of the Democratic Republic of the Congo

Tanganyika Province du Tanganyika (French) Jimbo la Tanganyika (Swahili)
- Province
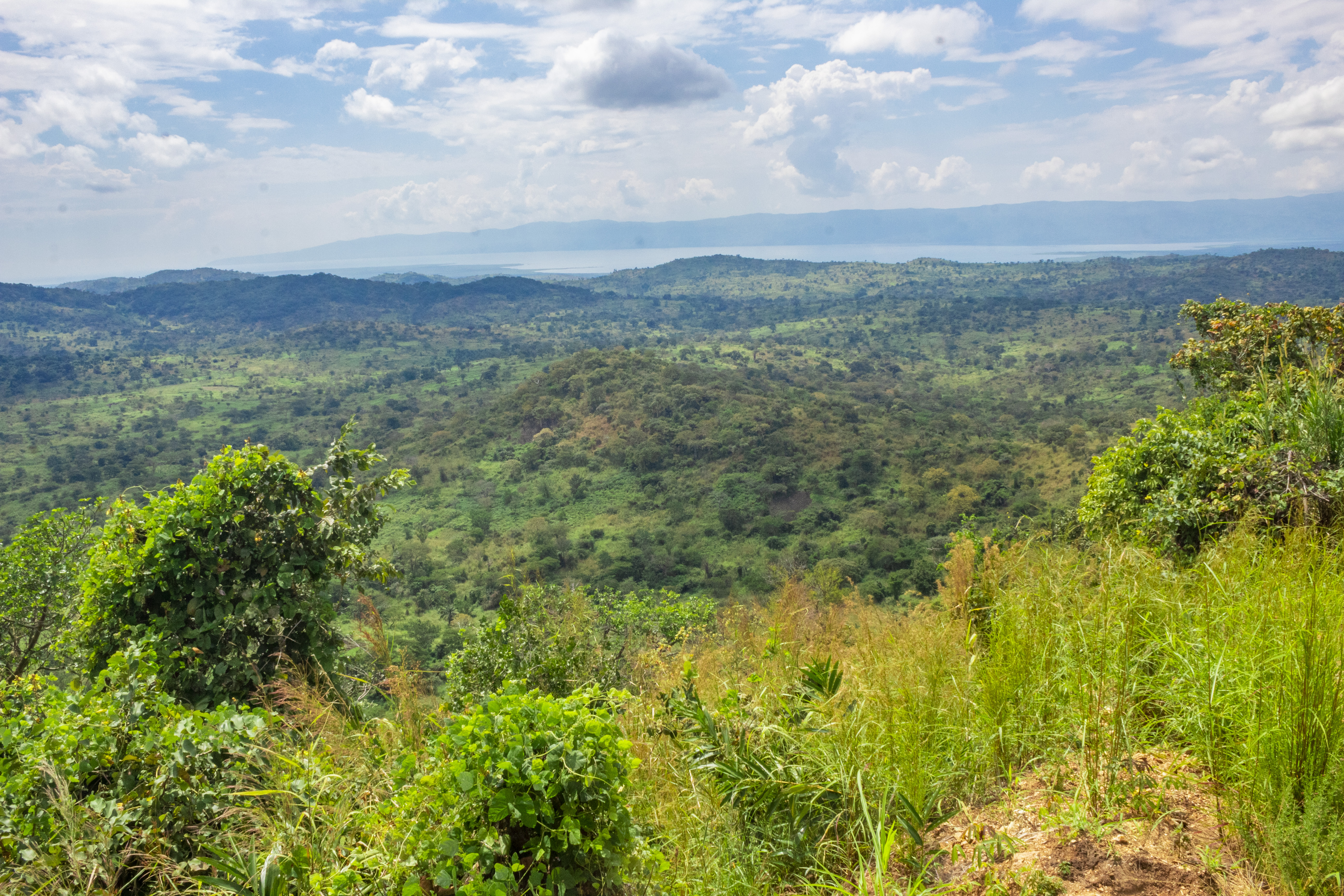

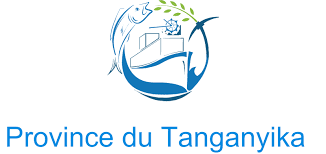
- Seal

- Tanganyika Province
- Interactive map of Tanganyika Province in the Democratic Republic of the Congo
- Coordinates: 6.69°S 28.07°E
- Country: DR Congo
- Established: 2015
- Named after: Lake Tanganyika
- Capital: Kalemie

Government
  - Governor: Christian Kitungwa

Area
  - Total: 134,940 km^{2} (52,100 sq mi)

Population (2015)
  - Total: 3,062,000
  - Density: 22.69/km^{2} (58.77/sq mi)

Ethnic groups
  - Native: Bataabwa • Luba-Katanga (Baluba) • Bahemba • Baholoholo • Batumbwe • Babuyu • Babwile • Bangubangu • Babembe • Waungwana • Basongye • Batwa • Wagoma
  - Settler: Banyarwanda • Barundi
- Time zone: UTC+2 (CAT)
- License Plate Code: (Democratic Republic of the Congo) CGO / 24
- Official language: French
- National language: Kiswahili
- Website: tanganyika.gouv.cd

Tanganyika (Swahili: Jimbo la Tanganyika) is one of the 26 provinces of the Democratic Republic of the Congo created in the 2015 repartitioning. Tanganyika, Haut-Katanga, Haut-Lomami and Lualaba provinces are the result of the splitting up of the former Katanga province. Tanganyika was formed from the Tanganyika district whose town of Kalemie was elevated to capital city of the new province.

The new province's territory corresponds to the historic Nord-Katanga province that existed in the early period of post-colonial Democratic Republic of the Congo between 1962 and 1966.

== History ==
Tanganyika province was the scene of a rebellion by the Luba-Katanga people against the independent state of Katanga. In 1961, it was reconquered by the Katanga state, only to be taken back by the Kinshasa government later that year. From July 11, 1962, to December 28, 1966, this area was known as the province of Nord-Katanga, but the administration of the province was taken over in 1966 by the central government. It was finally merged into the restored Katanga Province by the Mobutu government, where it was administered as the Tanganyika district. In 2015, Tanganyika was restored to full provincial status.

In July 2006, during the Second Congo War, Katanga province was divided by fighting between the Rally for Congolese Democracy – Goma (RCD-G) faction, supported by Rwanda, and the ex-government faction, supported by local Mai Mai troops. While the RCD-G and some Mai Mai militia have been subsumed into the Congolese army (FARDC), many Mai Mai elements remain outside of government control. According to UN forces (MONUC) in Kalemie, an estimated 5,000–6,000 Mai Mai militia were still active in the Tanganyika region and have strongholds around Nyunzu-Kabalo-Kongolo and the so-called "death triangle" of Manono-Mitwaba-Pweto. MONUC officials said at the time that the majority of these Mai Mai form small, unstructured units with no chain of command and have largely devolved into common bandits.

== Demographics ==
The province of Tanganyika has historically been inhabited by various Congolese ethnic groups, including the Luba, Hemba, Songye, Batwa, Batumbwe, Babuyu, Bembe, Batabwa, Bena-tanga, Kayabala, Kansabala, Manda, Manye...

Another important group in the province of Tanganyika in recent decades is the Shi, which includes the Havu, Fuliru, and Nyindu peoples who are part of this larger group. They are mainly present in urban areas and in several localities where they are active in trade and business.

== Administration ==
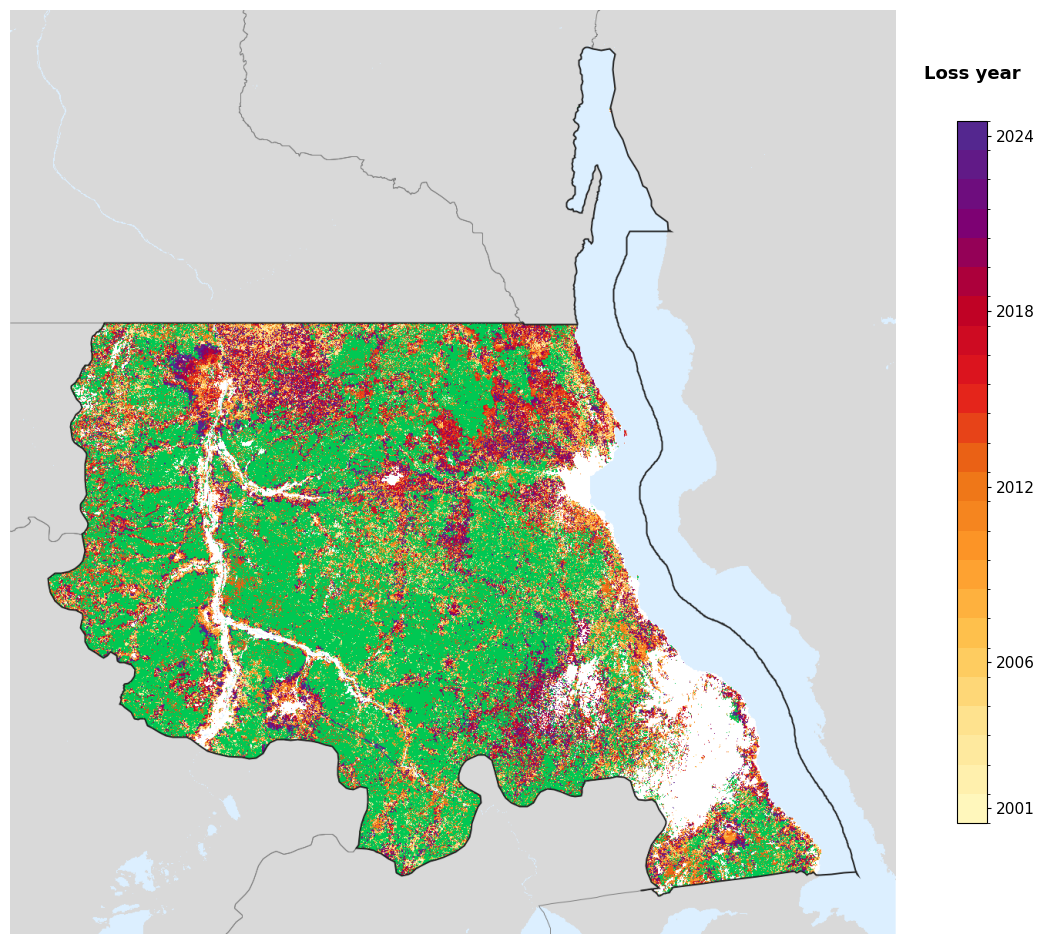
Tree-cover loss year in Tanganyika, 2001-2024, from the Global Forest Change dataset.

Tanganyika is divided in to six territories and one independently administered city.

Administrative division	Type	Map
Kalemie	City	Kalemie
Kabalo	Territory	Kabalo
Kalemie	Territory	Kalemie
Kongolo	Territory	Kongolo
Manono	Territory	Manono
Moba	Territory	Moba
Nyunzu	Territory	Nyunzu

== Governors ==
Presidents (from 1965, governors) of the former province were:

- 20 Oct 1960 – Mar 1961 Prosper Mwamba-Ilunga (1st time)
- 11 Sep 1962 – 27 Sep 1963 Prosper Mwamba-Ilunga (2nd time)
- 27 Sep 1963 – 15 Mar 1964 Jason Sendwe (1st time) (b. 1917 – d. 1964)
- 15 Mar 1964 – 21 Apr 1964 Fortunat Kabange Numbi (b. 1934 – d. 1964)
- 21 Apr 1964 – 18 Jun 1964 Jason Sendwe (2nd time) (s.a.)
- 22 Jun 1964 – Jul 1964 Ildephonse Masengo (b. c.1935 – d. 1969)
  - (head of a provisional government for the whole Katanga province, in fact the territories occupied by the forces of the People's Republic)
- 22 Jul 1965 – 5 Nov 1966 Henri Ndala Kambola
  - (administrator since Aug 1964?)
- 2019 – 2021 Zoé Kabila (brother of ex-president Joseph Kabila)
- 20 June 2022 – 15 July 2024 Julie Ngungwa Mwayuma
- 15 July 2024 – present Christian Kitungwa Muteba
