= Ilunga Sungu =

- Mulopwe
- Investiture: c. 1790
- Predecessor: Kumwimbe Kaumbu
- Successor: Kumwimbe Ngombe
- Died: c. 1810; Katende

Ilunga Sungu (died c. 1810) was a ruler (Mulopwe) of the Kingdom of Luba in what is now the Katanga Province of the Democratic Republic of the Congo, said to have reigned from about 1780 to his death.

== Early years ==
Ilunga Sungu's father was King Kekenya and his mother was a Songye princess named Dyango. Kekenya soon died and was succeeded by his nephew, Kumwimbe Kaumbu. Ilunga Sungu lived with his mother's Ilande subgroup of southern Songye people while he was a child. Traditions say Kumwimbe Kaumbu attacked the northern Songe and much of the fighting took place among the southern Songye, but do not mention an attack on Ilunga Sungu. After Kumwimbe Kaumbu died following an unsuccessful battle, he was briefly succeeded by his brother Miketo. Ilunga Sungu disputed the succession and gained the throne without serious opposition.

== King ==
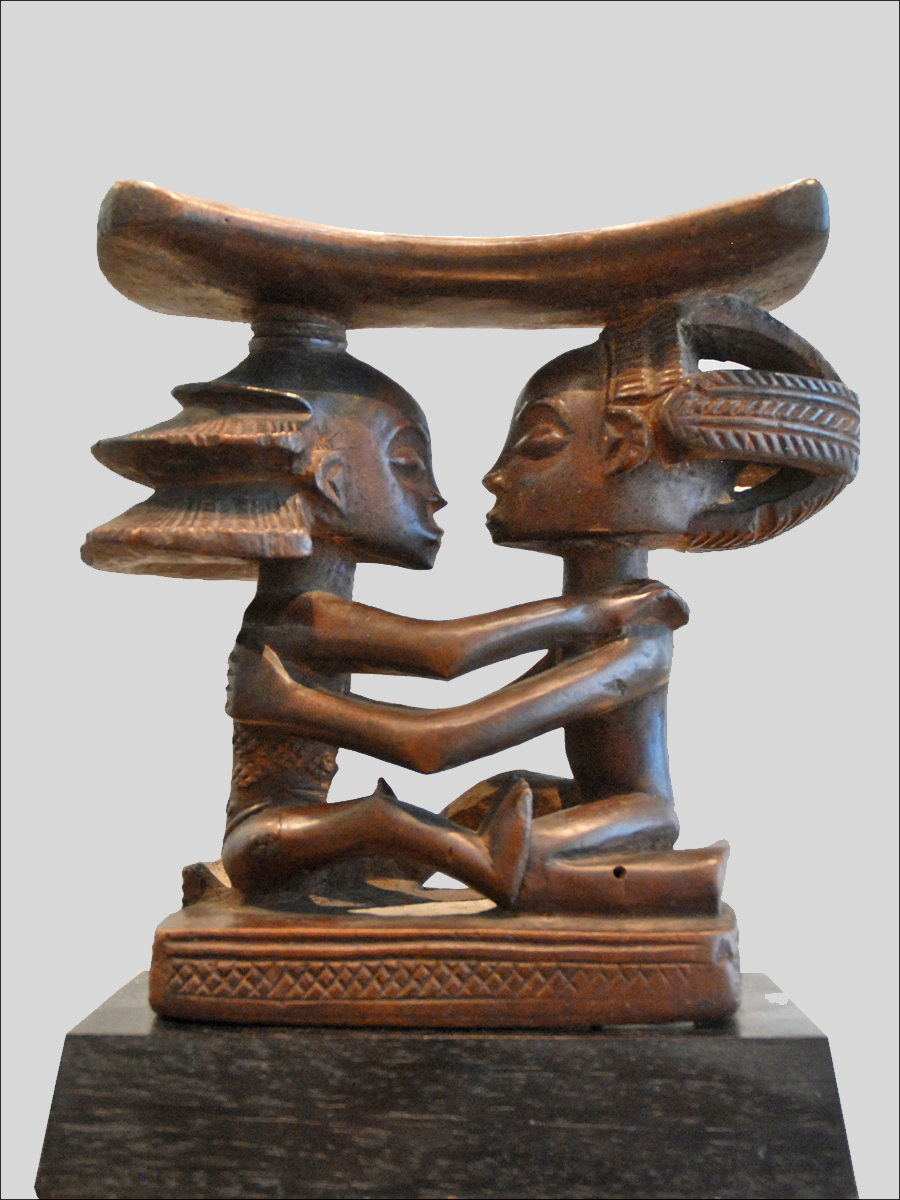
A nineteenth century Luba sculpture

Ilunga Sungu gained power around 1780, although the exact date is very uncertain. He established his court at Katende, southwest of Lake Boya and 25 kilometres (16 mi) to the west of the Mashyo salt district of the Luba heartland. Previously the Luba kings had built their palaces northeast of Lake Boya, but the move to Katende set a precedent for locating the capital near the Mashyo resource that was followed by Ilunga Sungu's successors. Later he established a second residence at Kipushya village 200 kilometres (120 mi) to the east in the upper Luvidjo River valley, in the iron-producing region of Kilulwe. The two residences lay on either side of the heartland with its wealth of iron and salt. During his rule, the Luba Empire expanded, conquering and assimilating distant peoples, often in densely populated regions. The size achieved was impressive given that all travel was by foot or by canoe.

The kingdom of Mutombo Mukulu lay between the Luba kingdom to its east and the Lunda kingdom to the west. Ilunga Sungu attempted to persuade Mutombo Mukulu to accept his authority, and when this was refused made an unsuccessful attempt to conquer the kingdom. The Kanyok states lay still further west in the area between the Lubilash and Mbuji Mayi rivers. By tradition, the heads of these states paid tribute to the Luba emperors, and at their accession had to visit the Luba emperor and pay tribute before being acknowledged. Around 1800 the Kanyok states became unified, and rejected Luba authority. According to legend, the town of Katende had become so large that the "Lord of Hygiene" could not keep the streets clear of refuse and excrement, even working all day with the help of his sons and relatives. The old king complained, blaming the Kanyoks, and said they should take their dirt home with them. The Kanyok went back to their home in the west and never paid tribute to the Luba again. The Luba invaded Kanyok territory, but after various engagements were forced to withdraw.

To the east, the Luba under Ilunga Sungu had more success with their expansionary policy. The land east of the Lualaba River between the Lukuga and the Luvua rivers was inhabited by the Hemba, or eastern Luba, in the east and the Tumbwe further east in the highlands beside Lake Tanganyika. Luba forces raided this territory and penetrated as far as the region of Kalemie at the source of the Lukuga where it exits the lake. Some of the Luba remained there, settling among the local Holoholo people and paying tribute to the Luba emperors. The Hemba also became tributaries to the Luba, headed by a "fire king", who symbolically represented the Luba king.

Ilunga Sungu died at Katende and was buried there. Two of Ilunga Sungu's sons, Kape and Kumwimbe Ngombe, disputed the throne. After several engagements Kape was captured and executed, and Kumwimbe Ngombe emerged as the ruler. The Hemba fire kingdom in the east cut its links to the Luba empire after Ilunga Sungu died. Kumwimbe had to fight several campaigns to recover the eastern territories.

== Sources ==
- Macola, Giacomo (2002). The kingdom of Kazembe: history and politics in North-Eastern Zambia and Katanga to 1950. LIT Verlag Münster. ISBN 3-8258-5997-5.
- Reefe, Thomas Q. (1981). The rainbow and the kings: a history of the Luba Empire to 1891. University of California Press. ISBN 0-520-04140-2.
- Yoder, John C. (2002). The Kanyok of Zaire: An Institutional and Ideological History to 1895. Cambridge University Press. ISBN 0-521-52310-9.
