= Holoholo language =

Bantu language of DR Congo

Holoholo
- Kalanga
- Hɔlɔhɔlɔ
- Pronunciation: [ɔlɔ.ɔlɔ]
- Native to: DR Congo
- Native speakers: 16,000 (2002)
- Language family: Niger–Congo?: Atlantic–Congo; Benue–Congo; Bantoid; Bantu; Northeast Bantu?; Takama?; Holoholo

Language codes
- ISO 639-3: hoo
- Glottolog: holo1240
- Guthrie code: D.28
- ELP: Holoholo

Holoholo is a Bantu language of DR Congo and formerly in Tanzania spoken by the Holoholo people on either side of Lake Tanganyika. Classification is uncertain, but it may belong with the Takama group (Nurse 2003:169).

Maho (2009) classifies D281 Tumbwe (Etumbwe) and D282 Lumbwe as closest to Holoholo. Neither has an ISO code.

The letter ⟨h⟩ in the name is silent, and used to separate vowels: [ɔlɔ.ɔlɔ].
