= Julie Ngungwa =

Congolese politician (born 1973)

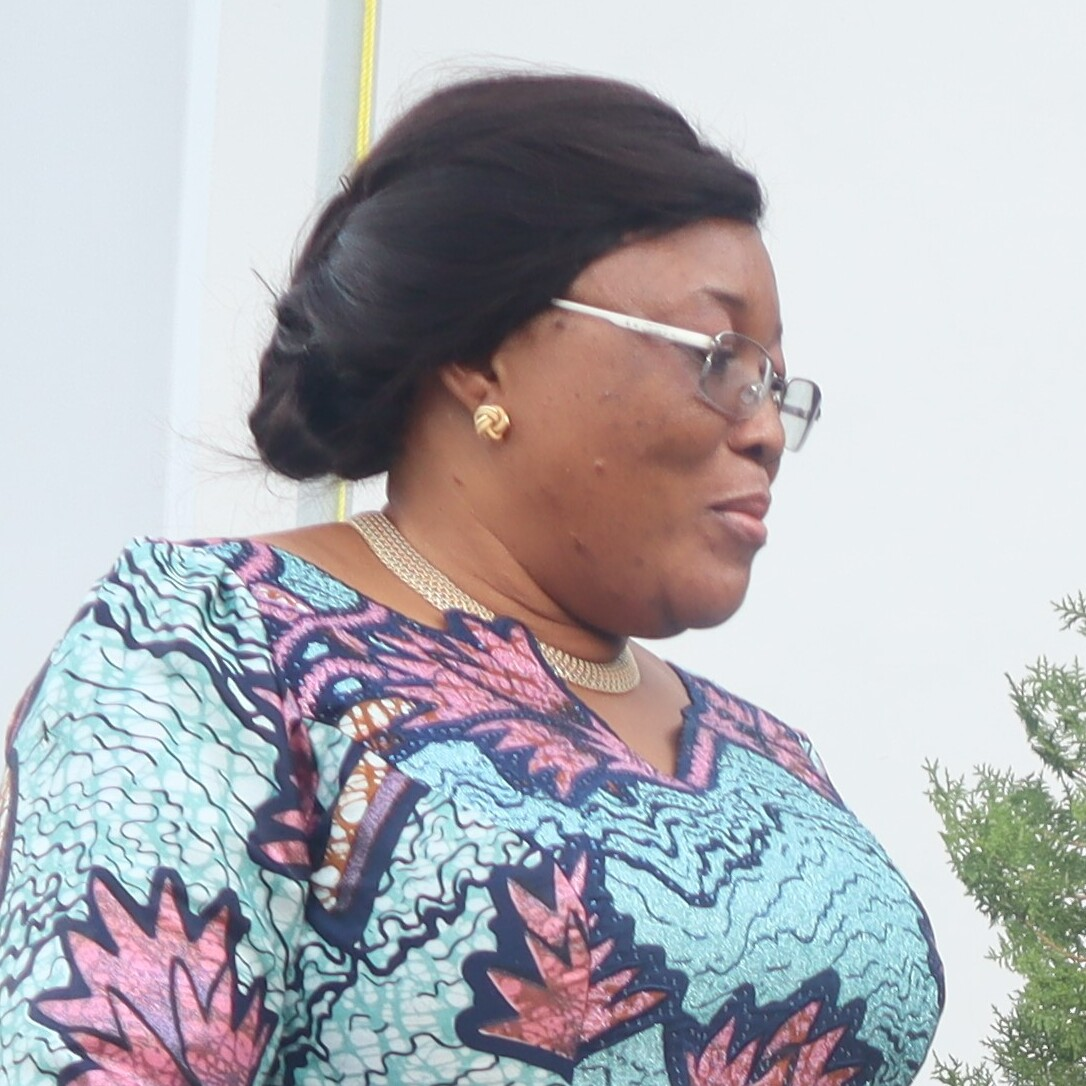
- in 2022

Governor of Tanganyika Province
- In office 20 June 2022 – 15 July 2024
- President: Felix Tshisekedi
- Preceded by: Samba Mony (interim)
- Succeeded by: Christian Kitungwa

Personal details
- Born: 29 September 1973 (age 52) Likasi, Zaire (present-day Democratic Republic of the Congo)
- Party: Union for Democracy and Social Progress
- Occupation: politician and businessperson

Julie Ngungwa Mwayuma (born 29 September 1973) is a Congolese politician. She was the Governor of Tanganyika Province from 2022 to 2024. The province was supported by the United Nations Organization Stabilization Mission in the Democratic Republic of the Congo (MONUSCO) until June 2022.

== Career ==
Ngungwa was a businessperson and a teacher. She led the Human Resources of "Alternative Sud Sarl" and she is the owner of a company named Horore Business Sarl. The company has a wide range of interests including heavy plant transportation, furniture rental, training, festivals and catering. In addition Ngunge volunteers as President of the Association of Tchoto mothers.

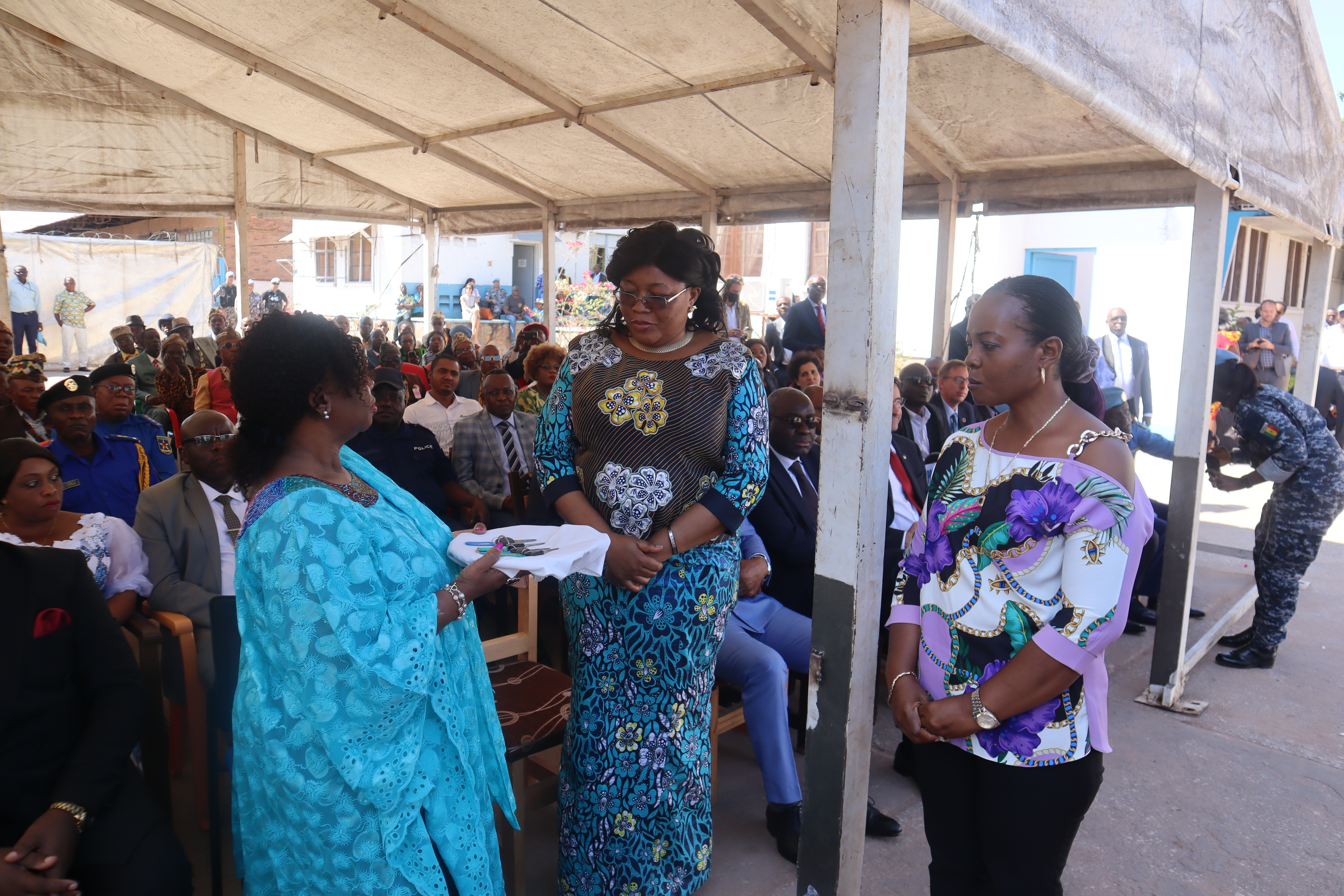
Closing ceremony of MONUSCO's operations in Tanganyika province on 21 June 2022

Governor Zoe Kabila of Tanganyika Province was voted out of office in 2021. Ngungwa was elected by the provincial assembly and she spoke to them of her ambition and her desire to be a mother to the children of the province. Ngungwa became the next governor in May 2022. She presented her program to the legislative assembly, pledging to make mitigating climate change her top priority and also saying she would focus on improving infrastructure, social services, and agriculture. Her deputy governor was Ferdinand Massamba Wa Massamba. The result of the election was challenged by the losing candidate, Élisée Kahozi, who had received no votes but he alleged that there was fraud. The court of appeal rejected Kahozi's claims on 20 May and Ngungwa and her deputy governor's positions were confirmed.

Three women governors were elected in the country, Ngugwe, Ritha Bola for the province of Mai-Ndombe (south-west), Isabelle Kalenga in Haut-Lomami This was hailed as significant for gender equality as no women governors had been elected in the previous election. The President Félix Tshisekedi invested Ngungwa and six other governors on Radio Télévision Nationale Congolaise on 9 June.

The closing ceremony of MONUSCO's operations in Tanganyika province took place on 21 June 2022. Bintou Keita who is the Secretary General of the United Nations' Special Representative in the Democratic Republic of Congo (DRC) and the Head of MONUSCO handed over responsibility to Ngungwa. Bintou Keita ceremonially handed over some keys witnessed by Albert Fabrice Puela who is the DRC Minister of Human Rights. MONUSCO's exit had been planned in 2020 but Bintou Keita has assured the province in April 2022 that the United Nations would still have a presence in the region even after MONUSCO left. Bintou Keita said at the ceremony that four of the territories in the province would be now free of UN troops but there would still be a presence in the territories of Nyunzu and Kalemie which remained in the "triangle of death" where serious crimes were happening in addition to Mai-Mai terrorism. In August 2022, Ngungwa was summoned to the Ministry of the Interior to explain the management of security in the province.

== Personal life ==
Ngungwa was born to Itotwa Mbayo and Fatuma Mamba on 29 September 1973 in Likasi. She earned a degree in Political and Administrative Sciences.

Her husband is Nkulu Shimba Louis and they have five children.
