= Mahale Mountains National Park =

National park in Tanzania

- IUCN category II (national park)
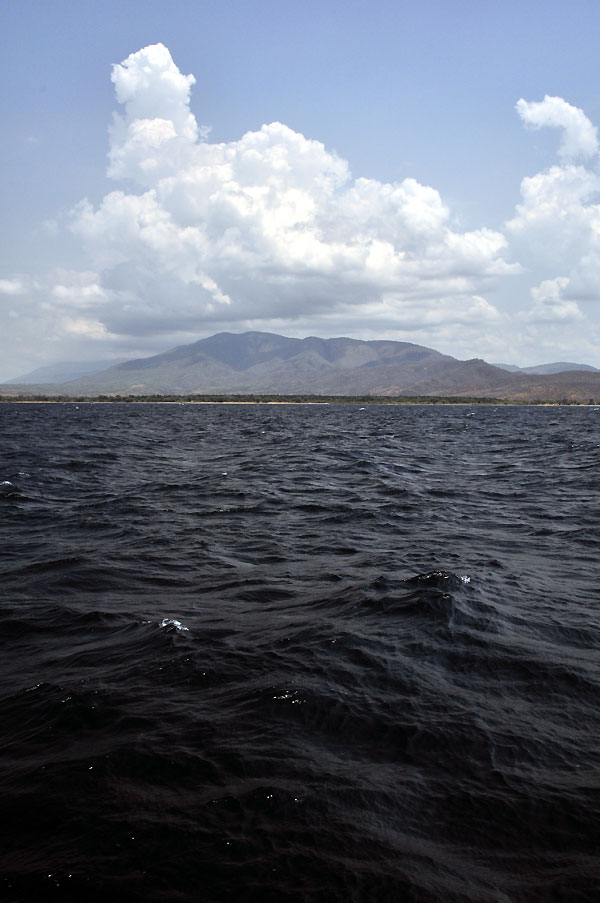

- Location within Tanzania
- Location: Tanzania
- Nearest city: Kigoma
- Coordinates: 6°16′S 29°56′E
- Area: 1,650 km^{2} (640 sq mi)
- Established: 1985
- Visitors: 1,074 (in 2012)
- Governing body: Tanzania National Parks Authority

Mahale Mountains National Park (Hifadhi ya Taifa ya Milima ya Mahale, in Swahili) is a national park of Tanzania. The park is located on the eastern shore of Lake Tanganyika in Uvinza District of Kigoma Region. It is named after the Mahale Mountains that are within its borders. It is one of only two protected areas for the Eastern chimpanzee in the country, and it harbours the largest known chimpanzee population. It also a place where chimpanzees and lions co-exist. Another unusual feature of the park is that it is one of the very few in Africa that must be experienced by foot. There are no roads or other infrastructure within the park boundaries, and the only way in and out of the park is via boat on the lake.

The Mahale mountains were traditionally inhabited by the Batongwe and Holoholo peoples, with populations in 1987 of 22,000 and 12,500 respectively. When the Mahale Mountains Wildlife Research Center was established in 1979, the people were forcefully evicted from the mountains to make way for the park, which opened in 1985 despite the people had been highly attuned to the natural environment, living with virtually no impact on the ecology.
