= Mahale Mountains =

Mountain range in Uvinza District, Kigoma Region

Coordinates: 6.2000°S 30.0000°E

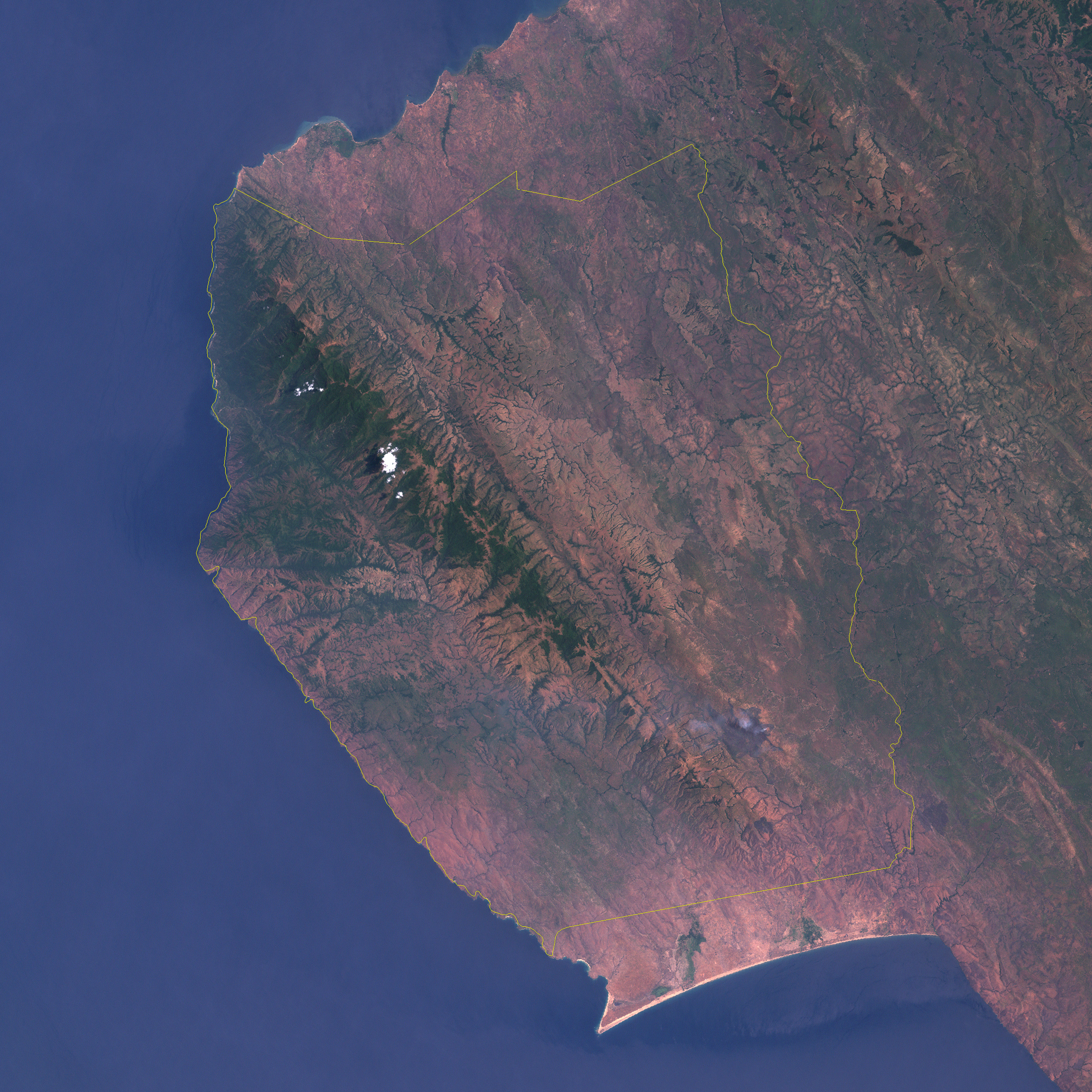
Satellite image of the Mahale Mountains within Mahale Mountains National Park, with park's borders are outlined in yellow.

The Mahale Mountains are a mountain range in Uvinza District of Kigoma Region in Tanzania. The mountains are on the eastern shore of Lake Tanganyika. They rise to 2,462 metres (8,077 ft) to Mount Nkungwe, Uvinza's highest point.

The range was once the ancestral home of the Holoholo people. Currently the area is a protected wildlife sanctuary, the Mahale Mountains National Park, which harbors chimpanzees and lions.

== Holoholo ==
They were the traditional homeland of the Holoholo people, before being relocated in the 1970s for the creation of Mahale Mountains National Park.

== See also ==
- Mountain ranges of Tanzania
