= Shinga, Jigawa State =

Coordinates: 12°22′47″N 10°12′20″E

Shinga is a town in Jigawa State of Nigeria. It is part of the Hadejia Local Government Area. It lies at an elevation of 337 metres (1,106 feet) on the banks of a tributary of the Hadejia River.
