= Shienga =

Village in Ghana

Coordinates: 10°31′32″N 0°31′46″W

Shienga (Shinga) is a village in East Mamprusi district, of the Northern Region of Ghana. It lies at an elevation of 349 meters near the right (southern) bank of the White Volta.
