= Shinga Deuxième =

Village in Sakuru, DR Congo

Coordinates: 03°15′20″S 024°37′41″E

Shinga Deuxième (Shinga, Shinga II) is a village in Sankuru province of the Democratic Republic of the Congo. It lies at an elevation of 611 meters along highway A807 fifty kilometers by road northwest of the town of Katako-Kombe, and just east of the Tshuapa River.
