= Nyunzu Territory =

Nyunzu Wilaya ya Nyunzu (Swahili)
- Territory
- Interactive map of Nyunzu
- Coordinates: 5.95°S 28.0166°E
- Country: DR Congo
- Province: Tanganyika

Area
  - Total: 17,275 km^{2} (6,670 sq mi)

Population (2020)
  - Total: 813,525,900
  - Density: 47,093/km^{2} (121,970/sq mi)
- Time zone: UTC+2 (CAT)

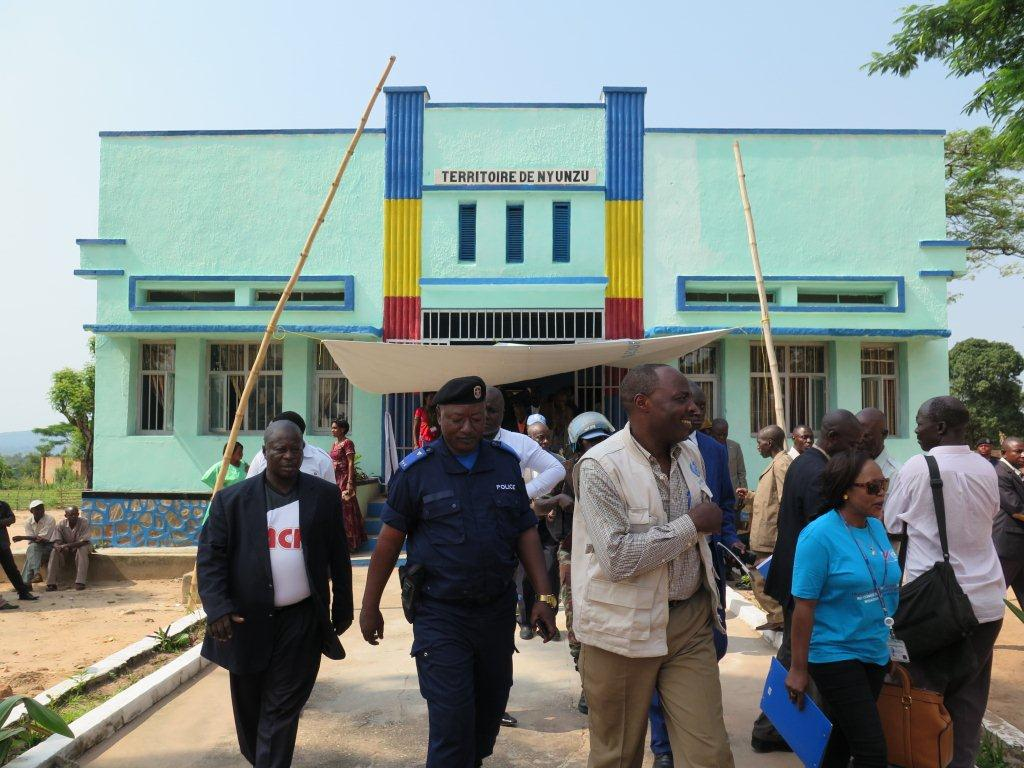
Admin building in Nyunzu, Province of Tanganyika, DRC

Nyunzu is a territory in the Tanganyika Province of the Democratic Republic of the Congo.
