= Lake Boya =

- Location within Democratic Republic of the Congo Location within Africa
- Coordinates: 7.36667°S 25.65°E
- Basin countries: Democratic Republic of the Congo

Lake Boya is a small lake about 5 kilometres (3.1 mi) east of Kabongo in Katanga Province of the Democratic Republic of the Congo. The lake is surrounded by high reeds, and has a thriving population of birds.

In the pre-colonial period the region around Lake Boya was a center of inter-regional trade, an important source of wealth for the Kingdom of Luba. The king and conqueror Kongolo established his capital near Lake Boya at Mwimbele at the start of the sixteenth century.

== Sources ==
- Malu-Malu, Jean-Jacques Arthur (2002). Le Congo-Kinshasa. KARTHALA Editions. ISBN 2-84586-233-4.
- Rorison, Sean (2008). Bradt Congo: Democratic Republic - Republic. Bradt Travel Guides. ISBN 978-1-84162-233-0.
