= Shinga, Democratic Republic of the Congo =

Village in Haut-Lomami

Coordinates: 7°28′S 25°47′E

Shinga is a village in the Haut-Lomami province of the Democratic Republic of the Congo. It lies at an elevation of 913 meters near the Mulombotwa River. It is about 30 kilometers by road southeast of the railhead and town of Kabongo.
