= Luba Empire =

Pre-colonial Central African state

Empire of Luba Baluba
- ?–1889
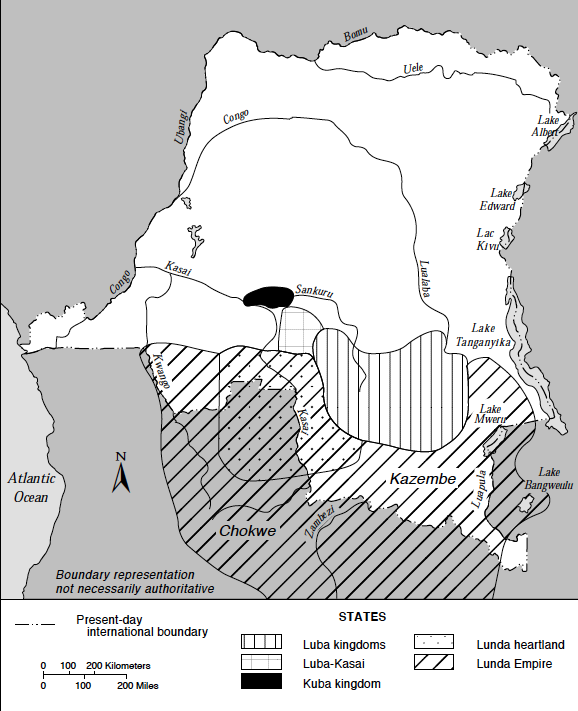
- Map of the Lunda Empire and Luba kingdoms in the Congo River Basin around 1850
- Capital: Mwibele (today in Haut-Lomami)
- Common languages: Kiluba
- Government: Monarchy
- muLopwe
  - c. 1780 – 1810: Ilunga Sungu
- History
  - Established: ?
  - Disestablished: 1889
Preceded by	Succeeded by
Upemba culture	Congo Free State
- Today part of: Democratic Republic of the Congo

The Luba Empire or Kingdom of Luba was a pre-colonial Central African state that arose in the marshy grasslands of the Upemba Depression in what is now southern Democratic Republic of the Congo.

== Origins and foundation ==
=== Archaeological research ===
Archaeological research shows that the Upemba Depression had been occupied continuously since at least the 4th century AD. In the 4th century, the region was occupied by iron-working farmers. Over the centuries, the people of the region learned to use nets, harpoons, make dugout canoes, and clear canals through swamps. They had also learned techniques for drying fish, which were an important source of protein; they began trading the dried fish with the inhabitants of the protein-starved savanna.

By the 6th century, fishing people lived on lakeshores, worked iron, and traded palm oil.

By the 10th century, the people of Upemba had diversified their economy, combining fishing, farming and metal-working. Metal-workers relied on traders to bring them the copper and charcoal that they needed in smelting. Traders exported salt and iron items, and imported glass beads and cowry shells from the distant Indian Ocean. At this time, according to John Thornton, social stratification and governance began to form.

The centre of the empire in the Kabongo region is yet to be excavated and undergo archaeological research, limiting knowledge of the empire's rise.

=== Dating the empire's founding ===
Congolese historians maintain that Luba oral traditions are based on historical events, and those such as Banza Mwepu Mulundwe, Lukanda Lwa Malale, Isidore Ndaywel è Nziem, and Bruno Crine-Mavar date the founding of the empire to the 8th, 12th, 14th, or 15th centuries respectively. Western scholars such as Jan Vansina and Harry Langworthy say sometime before the 15th century, while others such as Thomas Reefe and Mary Nooter Robert regard Luba traditions as myth and date it to the 18th century.

Vansina says that "Lords of the land" held priestly roles due to their special relationship with the spirits of the land and were widely recognised, holding sway over multiple villages and essentially ruling embryonic kingdoms. As lineages grew in size, authority was opportunistically absorbed or incorporated by force, leading to the formation of states.

=== Oral traditions ===
Luba-Katanga oral traditions start with a man named Kyubaka Ubaka (lit. "Maker of huts") and a woman named Kibumba Bumba (lit. "Pottery maker") who lived east of the upper Congo River. They gave birth to twins; a boy named Kyungu and a girl named Kibange. Several generations of the same names followed. People moved west with each generation until reaching the lands of the Luba.

An offspring of this line named Mwamba took the name Nkongolo (lit. "The rainbow"). He was red-skinned and was notorious for his cruelty. He used a nkololo curved knife to mutilate people. Nkongolo came to rule over many people as a mukalanga (a conqueror/self-made ruler, as opposed to mulopwe, a sacred king). His capital was Mwibele near Lake Boya.

One day Mbidi Kiluwe (lit. "Mbidi the hunter"), who came from the east, was searching for his hunting dog. Mbidi crossed the Lomami River and his followers founded the kingdoms Lukungu and Mutombo Mukulu. He came to the Lunda and fathered a child called Mwata Yamvo. Mbidi wandered to Mwibele and Nkongolo invited him to stay. From him Nkongolo learnt royal behaviour (ie. that of a sacred king), such as not to eat in anyone's view. Nkongolo accidentally insulted Mbidi and he set to return to the east. Nkongolo's sisters, who had been given to Mbidi as wives, were both pregnant. Mbidi told the sisters and the god Mijibu Kalenga that a black-skinned child would be his, while a red-skinned child would be Nkongolo's. He entrusted Mijibu Kalenga with looking after his child. On his return he crossed the Congo River and told the ferryman only to allow a black man, not red, to cross.

One sister gave birth to a black-skinned boy named Kalala Ilunga (lit. "Ilunga the warrior"). He was precocious. He became known as an athlete and hunter. Nkongolo challenged Ilunga to a game called masoko, similar to marbles. With the help of Mijibu Kalenga Ilunga won. They then played another game called bulundu, which involved kicking a latex ball. Ilunga won, again, with Mijibu Kalenga's help. Nkongolo's mother laughed at him and he had his mother buried alive. Ilunga saw black ants carrying off termites, which he took as a sign to make war, killing some of Nkongolo's men. While Ilunga was away collecting tribute, Nkongolo set a trap intended to kill him. With the help of a drummer, Ilunga discovered the trap, and fled east, crossing the Congo. Nkongolo pursued him, but the ferryman hid the canoes.

Ilunga brought together an army from his father's realm and returned. Nkongolo fled, amid attempts to build a fortified island. Ilunga and his men captured Nkongolo and executed him, burying his head and genitals in a sacred basket. The basket was brought to Ilunga's father's realm and buried. In its place grew an anthill, which was taken as a sign Nkongolo wished to stay there, making it the first sacred village (kitenta).

Ilunga established a court in Mwilunde, and took the title Mwine Munza ("lord of Munza"). Tribute came from all of the country and no region remained outside his control. He killed most of his children, leaving succession to two boys, Kazade Milele and one covered in animal hair, Ilunga Mwila. Mwine Munza wanted Ilunga Mwila killed, however the titleholder hid him at Bisonge, near the southern border with the Songye people. Kazadi died accidentally, with Shinta becoming a kitenta. Mwine Munza was upset he wouldn't have an heir to continue sacral kingship. The titleholder brought back Ilunga Mwila and Mwine Munza was overjoyed, with Ilunga Mwila succeeding him on his death. "Ilunga the Ugly One" ruled for a short time, and was succeeded by Kasongo Mwine Kibanza ("Kasongo lord of Kibanza"), with Kalongo becoming a kitenta.

Kasongo had four physically abnormal children. They were barred from succession. His first normal child was Ilunga Mpunji. He was caught with Kasongo's senior wife and they were drowned, and another son died of grief. Their spirits terrorised the people, however Kasongo consulted the diviner of the spirit Nkulu and killed them. Kasongo Bisonwe was the offspring of the son who died of grief, and was his grandfather's favourite. Kasongo Bisonwe was declared his successor and was protected from the wrath of his uncles. Kasongo Mwine Kibanza died and there ensued dynastical conflict. The other claimants died, one from a snake bite, one from a leopard. Kasongo Bisonwe, now Kasongo Kabundulu, defeated another claimant in battle to become ruler. Kabanda became his kitenta.

== Empire ==
=== Government ===
The kingdom of Luba's success was due in large part to its development of a form of a government durable enough to withstand the disruptions of succession disputes and flexible enough to incorporate foreign leaders and governments. The Luba model of governing was so successful that it was adopted by the Lunda Kingdom and spread throughout the region that is today northern Angola, northwestern Zambia, and southern Democratic Republic of Congo.

Law and order were handled by the king, known as the Mulopwe ('sacred king'), with the assistance of a court of nobles known as Bamfumus. The kings reigned over their subjects through clan kings known as Balopwe. The diverse populations of the Luba were linked by the Bambudye, a secret society that kept the memory of the Luba alive and taught throughout the realm.

=== Kingship ===
The Mbudye tradition states that all of the rulers of the Luba Empire traced their ancestry to Kalala Ilunga, a mystical hunter credited with toppling Kongolo Mwamba. This figure is also credited with the introduction of advanced iron forging techniques to the Luba peoples. Luba kings became deities upon their deaths, and the villages from which they ruled were transformed into living shrines devoted to their legacies.

The Luba heartland was dotted with these landmarks. Central to Luba regalia for kings and other nobles were mwadi, female incarnations of the ancestral kings. Staffs, headrests, bow stands and royal seats featuring this subject represented the divine status of the ruler and the elegant refinement of his court.

=== Mbudye ===
The Luba Kingdom kept official "men of memory" who were part of a group called the Mbudye. They were responsible for maintaining the oral histories associated with kings, their villages and the customs of the land. Parallels to these kinds of officials can be found in neighboring kingdoms such as Kuba and Lunda.

=== Economy ===
The local economy led to the development of several small Luba kingdoms. Luba traders linked the Congolese forest to the north with the mineral-rich region in the center of modern Zambia known as the Copperbelt. The trade routes passing through Luba territory were also connected with wider networks extending to both the Atlantic and Indian Ocean coasts.

With the formation of the Luba kingdom, the economy was complex and based on a tribute system that redistributed agricultural, hunting and mining resources among nobles. The ruling class held a virtual monopoly on trade items such as salt, copper, and iron ore. This allowed them to continue their dominance in much of Central Africa.

=== Arts and beliefs ===
As in the Kuba Kingdom, the Luba Kingdom held the arts in high esteem. A carver held relatively high status, which was displayed by an adze (axe) that he carried over his shoulder. Luba art varied because of the kingdom's vast territory. Some characteristics are common. The important role of woman in the creation myths and political society resulted in the decoration of many prestigious objects with female figures.

Headrests and staffs were of great importance in relation to beliefs about prophetic dreams and ancestor worship. Dreams were believed to communicate messages from the other world. Therefore, it was common to have two priestess figures adorned on a headrest on which one slept. Luba staffs, usually owned by kings, village chiefs or court dignitaries, were also carved with dual or paired female figures. Single figures on art pieces, specifically staffs, represented dead kings whose spirits are carried in a woman's body.

Among the Luba, the name "Nkole" appears at the head of every genealogy. It is an honorific title, with the literal meaning of "the essentially powerful". It was given to the three most distant patriarchs and inserted symbolically in all genealogies.

In Baluba tradition, a kasala is a well-defined form of slogans in free-verse poetry. They are chanted or recited, sometimes with instrumental accompaniment, by men and women who are professional specialists. It dramatizes public events that call for strong emotions, such as courage in battle, collective joy at official functions, and bereavement at funerals. In style and content, the kasala by itself is a diverse genre of proverbs, myths, fables, riddles, tales and historical narratives.

== Later expansion and apogee ==
The Luba Empire greatly expanded its influence during the period from 1700-1860. This expansion was done through tributaries, where Luba armies frequently targeted population-dense regions (usually under smaller states with less military resistance) to extract tribute from them to the emperor. In the 18th century, the Luba invaded groups of the Songye people, but did not conquer them, and consolidated their power north of the Upemba Depression. Trade and tribute extraction were emphasized during this period rather than conquest of land.

In the 19th century, the Luba began invading their neighbors to set up their own vassal tributaries. They first attempted western invasions for the submission of the Kingdom of Kanyok and the Kingdom of Kalundwe, the buffer states between Luba and Lunda, though this ultimately failed. Instead, they focused their efforts on less centralized regions, mainly to the east and south of Luba. They established client states known as "fire kingdoms" - vassal kingdoms on the Luba frontier that were granted the sacred royal fire embers of the Luba kings (whom they were often seen as equals to). However, the fire would "burn out" with the death of the king, meaning their status as a "fire kingdom" would only last for the king's tenure.

The Luba set up three main fire kingdoms in the 19th century:

- Fire Kingdom of Kyombo Mkubwa: Established by one of King Ilunga Sungu's sons sometime before 1810, between the Lukuga and Luvua Rivers in the lands of the Hemba and Tumbwe people
- Fire Kingdom of Buki: Established around the many decentralized Songye chiefdoms in the early 19th century, Buki operated on both sides of the Congo River in Luba's northern frontier
- Katondo's Chiefdom: Katondo established a chiefdom around the lands of the Zela, northwest of Lake Mweru after Luba's war with Kazembe. They were given the royal embers of King Ilunga Kabale in the mid 19th century

== Decline ==
Ultimately, long-distance trade destroyed the kingdom of Luba. In the 1870s and 1880s, traders from East Africa began searching for slaves and ivory in the savannas of central Africa. The empire was raided for slaves beginning the rapid destruction of the Luba Kingdom. In 1889 it was split in two by a succession dispute, ending the unified state, and later joined the Congo Free State.

== See also ==
- Luba people
- List of rulers of Luba
- Kuba Kingdom
- Lunda Kingdom
