= Shinga, Peru =

High-mountain village in Lauricocha Province, in the Huánuco Region of Peru

Coordinates: 10°11′42″S 76°41′47″W

Shinga is a high-mountain village in Lauricocha Province, in the Huánuco Region of Peru. It lies at an elevation of 4001 meters on a tributary of the Rio Huayhuash.
