= Kabongo, Democratic Republic of the Congo =

Coordinates: 07°20′42″S 25°35′09″E

Kabongo is a town in eastern Democratic Republic of the Congo. It is also the seat of the current muLopwe (Grand Chief or King) of the Kabongo lineage of the Baluba royal line, Kumwimba Kabongo Kansh'imbu. It is within a few miles of the historical capital of the Luba Empire. The area around Kabongo is yet to undergo archaeological research, limiting knowledge about the empire's rise.

== Transport ==
It is served by a station on a branch of the national railway network.

== See also ==
- Railway stations in DRCongo
