= Hemba people =

Bantu ethnic group

The Hemba people or Bahemba are a Bantu ethnic group in the Democratic Republic of the Congo (DRC).

== History ==
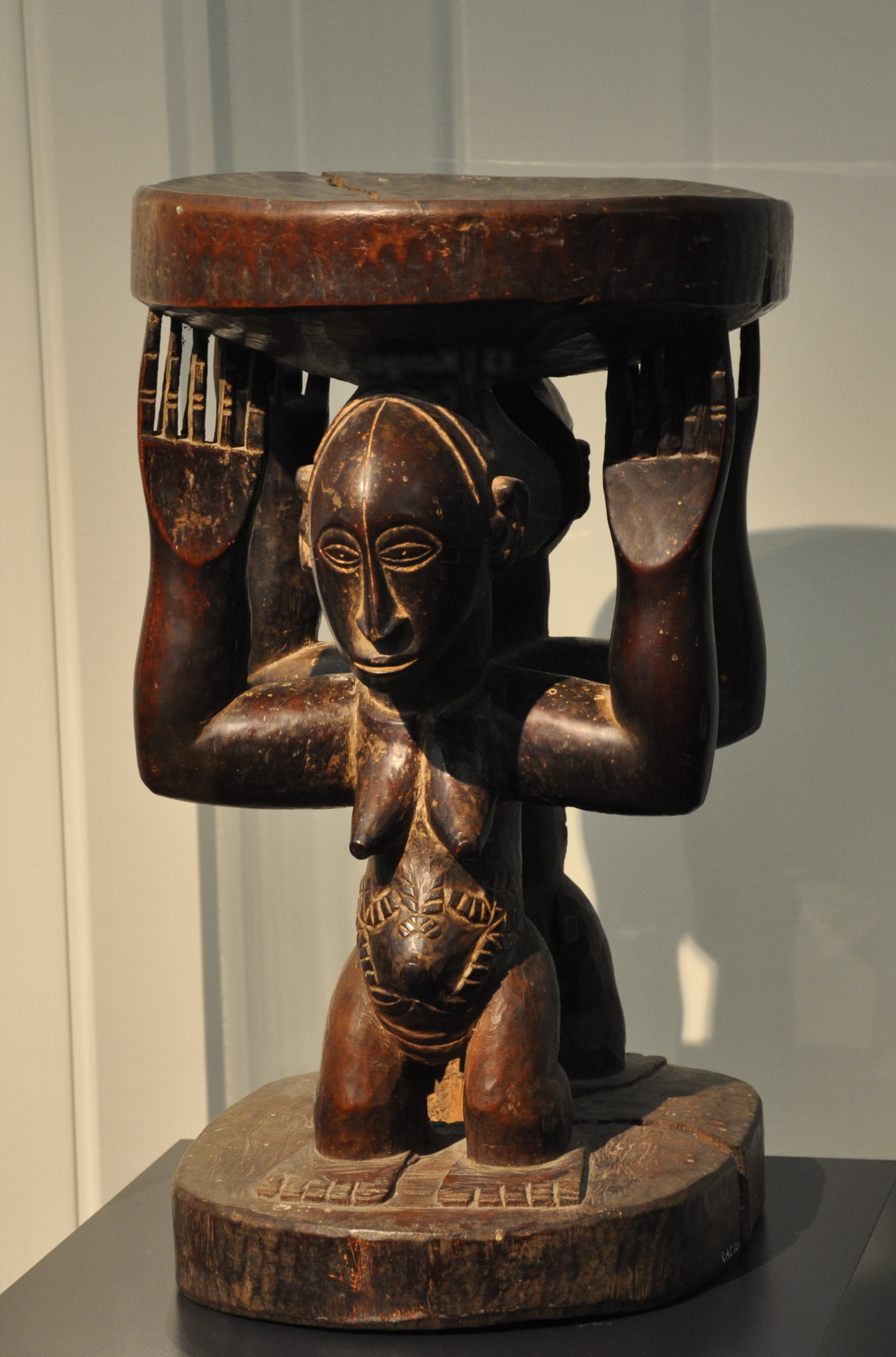
Hemba carved stool

The Hemba language belongs to a group of related languages spoken by people in a belt that runs from southern Kasai to northeastern Zambia. Other peoples speaking related languages include the Luba of Kasai and Shaba, the Kanyok, Songye, Kaonde, Sanga, Bemba and the people of Kazembe. Today, the Bemba people live in the north of Zambia, and their language is understood throughout Zambia. Some also live in Tanzania. The Hemba live west of Lake Tanganyika and Lake Mweru in the Democratic Republic of the Congo, and their villages are found several hundred miles up the Lualaba River. The Hemba live in the eastern part of DRC occupying the Upemba depression, Nyunzu and Kongolo.

The Hemba people migrated eastward to the Lualaba valley from the Luba Empire, probably some time after 1600. They traded salt for iron hoes made in the Luba heartland, and wore raphia cloth that came by way of the Luba from the Songye people further to the west. At the time of the eastward expansion of the Luba Empire under King Ilunga Sungu around 1800, Hemba people were living in a territory bounded by the Lukuga River in the north, the Luvua River in the south and the Lualaba River to the west. The lower Lukuga and the Lualaba provided natural lines of communication, and the river valleys were densely populated.

During Ilunga Sungu's rule the southern Hemba became tributaries to the Luba. They were headed by a "fire king", who symbolically represented the Luba king. The Hemba fire kingdom cut its links to the Luba empire after Ilunga Sungu died. His successor, Kumwimbe Ngombe, had to fight several campaigns to recover the eastern territories. Kumwimbe created a client state that united the Hemba villages of the Lukushi River valley, and that played an important role in preserving Luba dominance over other small states in the region. Later the Hemba regained their independence, but were subject to attacks by Arab slave traders in the later part of the nineteenth century, and then to colonization by the Belgians.

== Culture ==
The Hemba people live in villages ranging from as small as 10 individuals to as many as 4,000 per village, recognizing chiefs as their political leaders. A chief will be the head of an extended family of landowners, inheriting his title through the maternal line. Hemba people may also belong to secret societies such as the Bukazanzi for men and Bukibilo for women as well as the Baubwilo-dancers, singers and healers, the Bamukota-skilled in praise poetry, Bagabo-the oldest of the Hemba secret societies who focus on divination, Baso'o-focusing on fertility and the only society to use spirit invested wooden masks. The reason that there are so many semi-secret societies dedicated to healing in the Hemba culture is that the line between the living and the dead is very thin, and the dead, known as Bafu, can cause illness among the living.

The So'o secret society is guarded by the beautifully carved mask of a chimpanzee-human, which is used in Hemba funeral rituals. The So'o is seen as a grotesque creature by the Hemba, an unnatural creature that is not of the urban city nor of the wilds, but somewhere in between. In the beginning of the Hemba funeral festival it has too much power and cannot be looked upon and must be fled from. A boogieman or representation of death, the So'o appears during the Hemba funeral festivals firstly as a wild creature that chases down young Hemba individuals. The So'o will not follow a young Hemba into farmland but, if whoever is being chased runs indoors and is caught by the So'o, the Masquerader takes off their mask and the witness must become part of the So'o society. Refusal to do so would mean that the individual is marked for death. During the Second half of the Hemba funeral festival the So'o becomes more tame, it is still a trickster or clown, that challenges the social status quo but it is able to be danced with and around, usually in an oval shape around the So'o as order has been restored and the Hemba people have conquered death and met it head on. These societies serve to offset the power of the chief.

During Hemba funeral festivals (known as malilo) men and women perform rituals and solve societal issues in different ways with different secret societies. These rituals can last from only one week for a young child to several months for an elder of the society. These festivals end with a song and dance ritual known as a musuusa and speeches which mark the end of the mourning period for the dead individual.

Although the Luba people failed to keep the southern Hemba in their kingdom they did have considerable cultural influence. Art forms, including wooden sculptures representing ancestors, are similar in style to Luba sculptures. The Hemba religion recognizes a creator god ['Abezha Mbungu] and a separate supreme being. The Hemba make sacrifices and present offerings at the shrines of ancestors. When social harmony has been upset, religious leaders may demand offerings to the specific ancestors that have become displeased and are causing the trouble. Each clan owns a kabeja, a statuette with one body and two faces, male and female, on one neck. Sacrifices are made to the kabeja, which will convey them to the spirits. A receptacle on the top of the kabeja is used to receive magic ingredients. A kabeja is dangerous to handle.

== Religion ==
Christian influences are strong in the Democratic Republic of the Congo, missionaries converted many indigenous individuals to Catholicism and Protestant movements. Muslim influences as well as other religions are also present in the DRC. The Hemba People also have their own native religion that is based upon the Luba Traditions.

== Economy ==
The villagers live by subsistence agriculture, growing manioc, maize, peanuts, and yams. The rural Hembaland where they farm has a 8-month growing season with up to 55 inches of rain per year. They also hunt and fish to a small extent to supplement their diet. Cash is obtained through panning alluvial copper from the streams. Many Hemba men are also employed as miners in the copperbelt.

== Gallery of Hemba artwork ==
The Hemba artistic tradition is well known. Subjects include ancestral figures, spirits, human faces and ceremonial masks and included items such as stools, cup bearers, masks, drums and various ritual and divination objects. The Hemba had very talented sculptors and the art of the tribe is mainly known for the ancestors figures, the Singiti, symbols of power who exude astonishing serenity and natural authority The Kabeja is a rare Janiform sculpture which represents the couple of founding ancestors of each clan. The statue was unique and owned by the chief, while each group had several Singiti figures. It was used in all Hemba ceremonies, as well as in court decisions

Other important sculpture work would be that of the So'o Masks. These masks were constructed to look like chimpanzee human faces with a large mouth that is seen as unnatural by the Hemba people. They are based on the normal proportions of a human head with the mouth of a chimpanzee, usually depicted with white and black hair streaks that resemble the colobus monkey

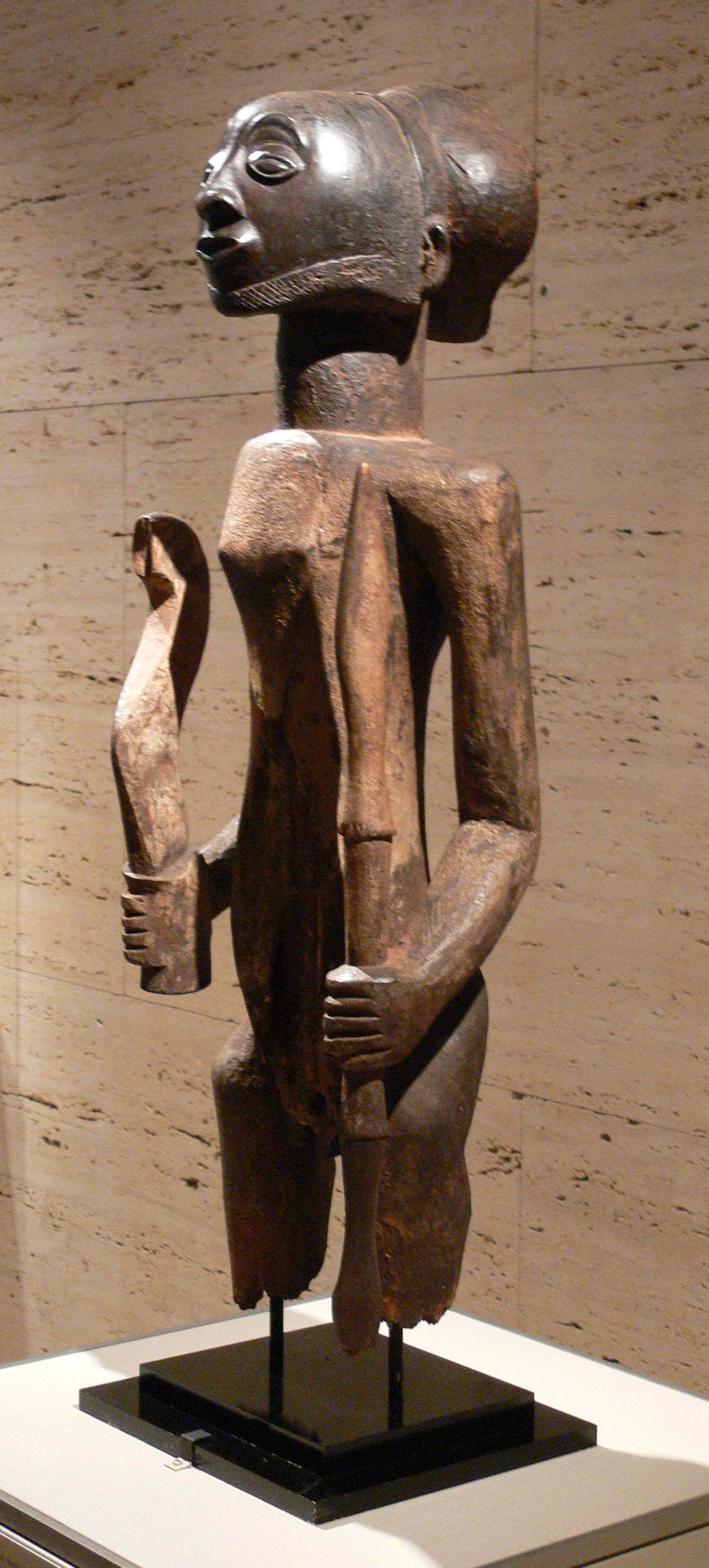
Warrior Ancestor Figure; 19th century

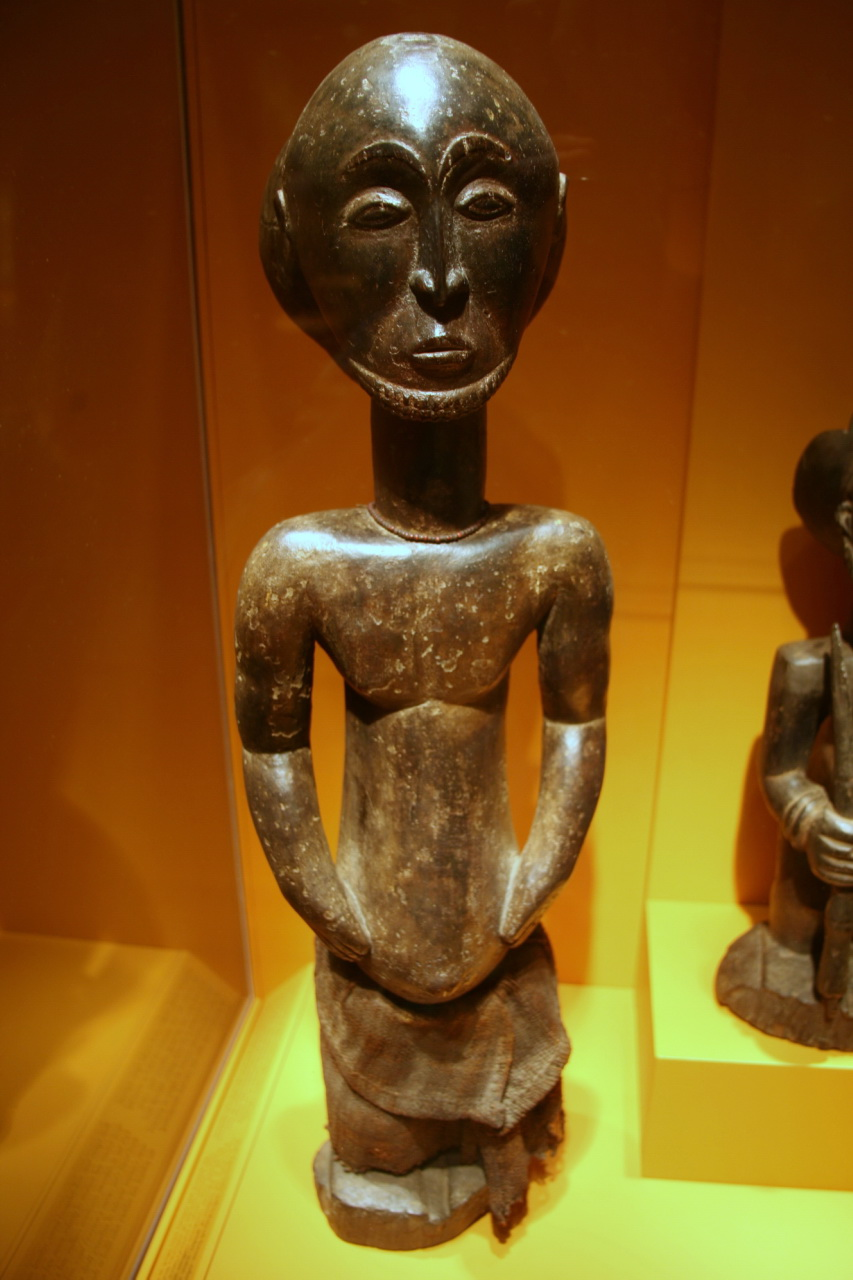
Male figure, Niembo chiefdom, late 19th to early 20th century

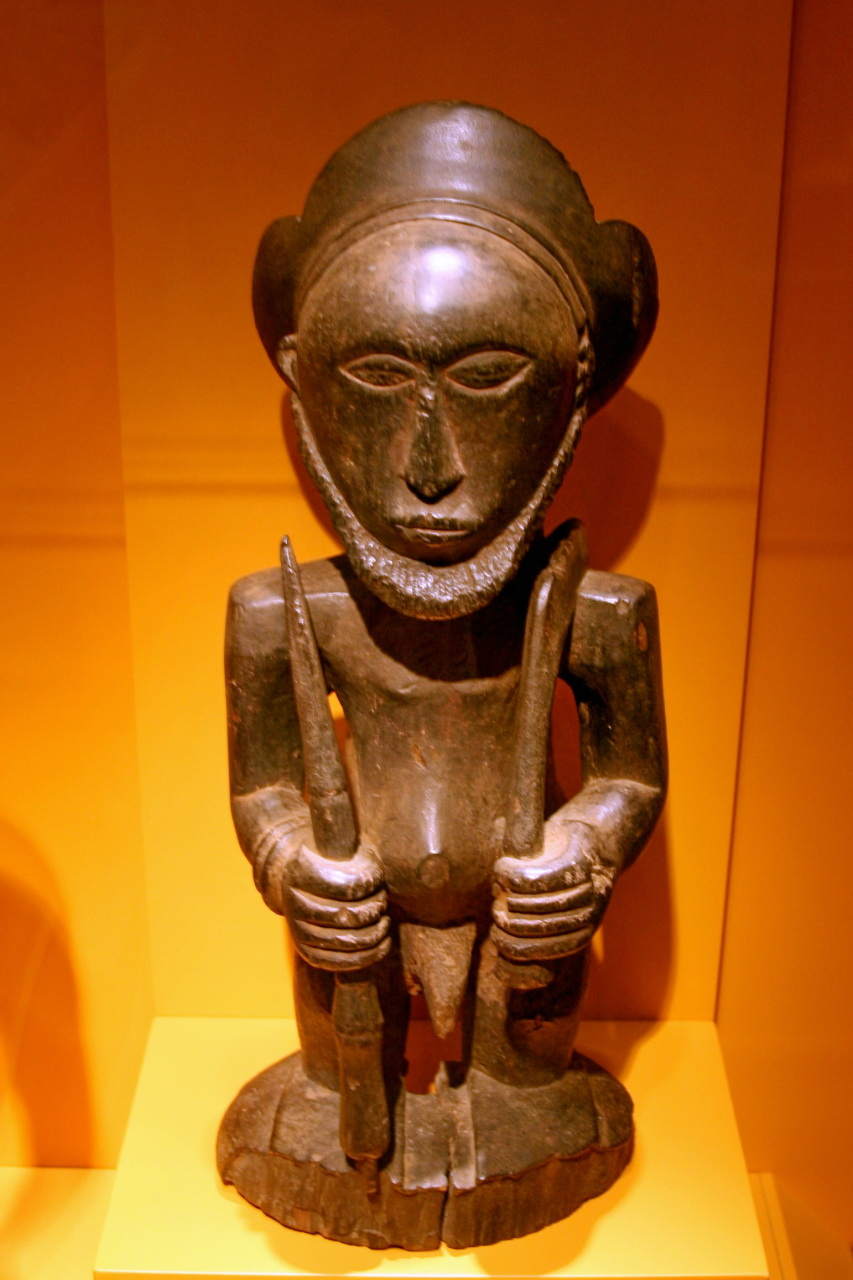
Male figure, Niembo chiefdom, late 19th to early 20th century

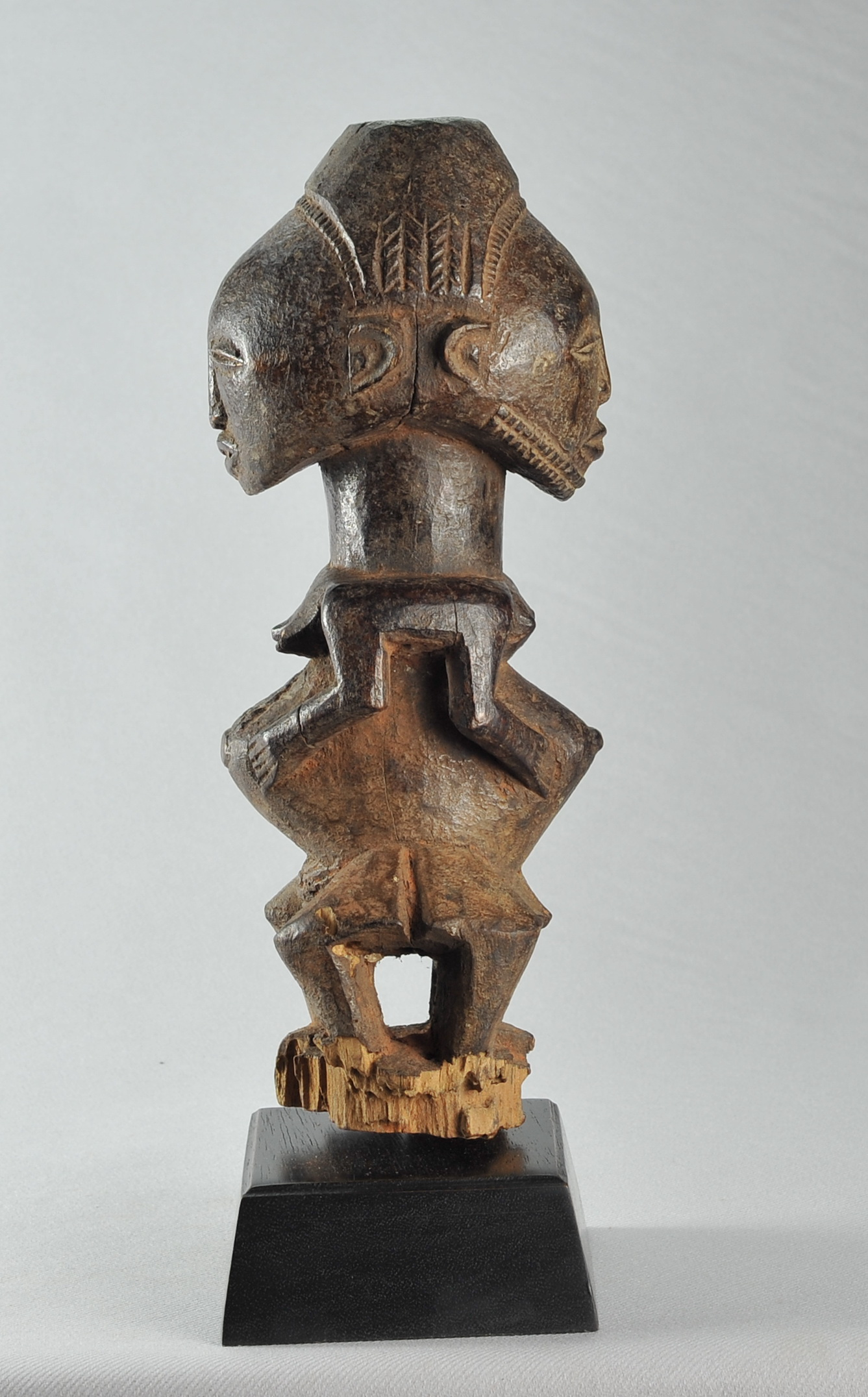
Kabeja Hemba

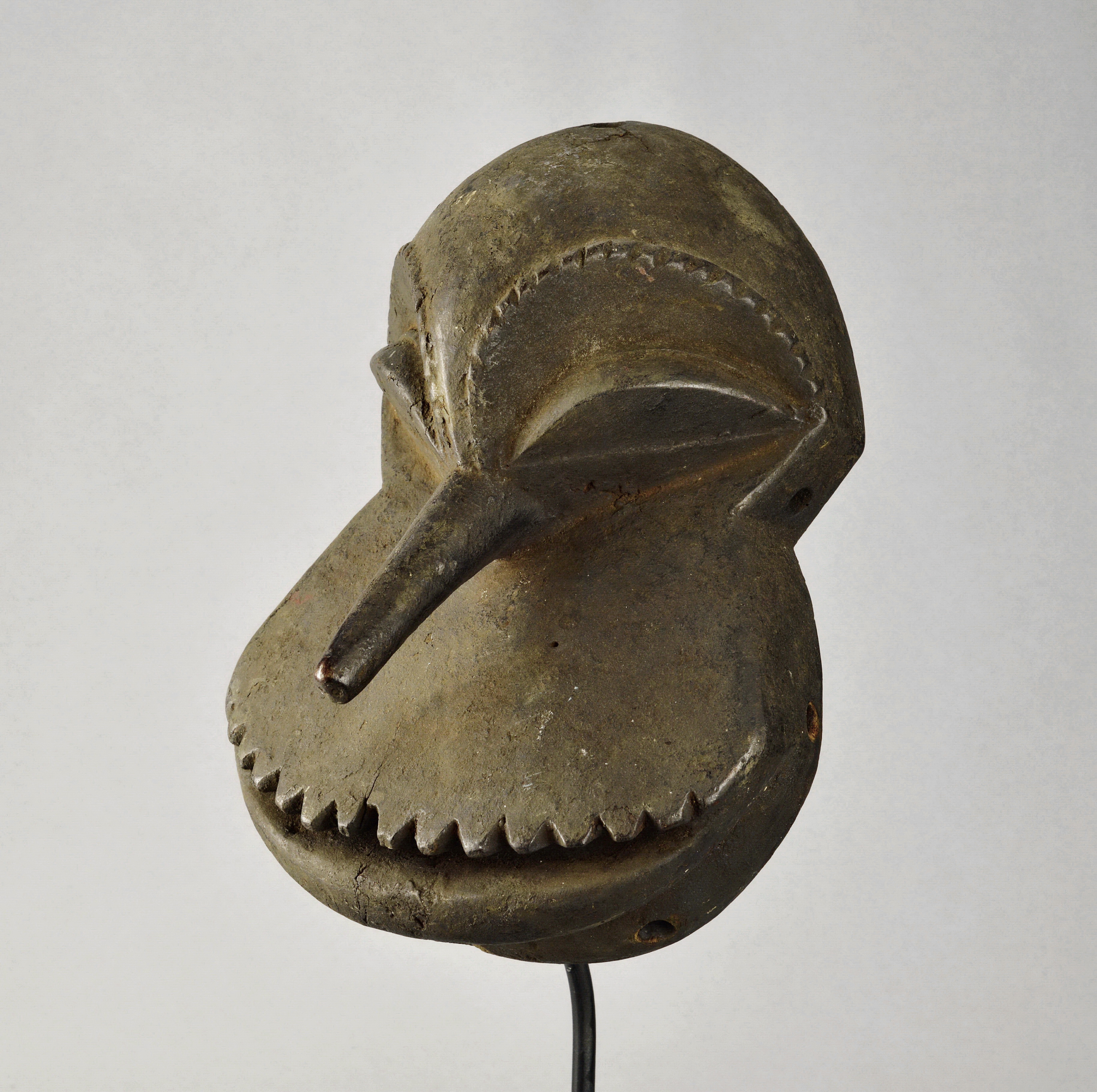
So'o Hemba Mask

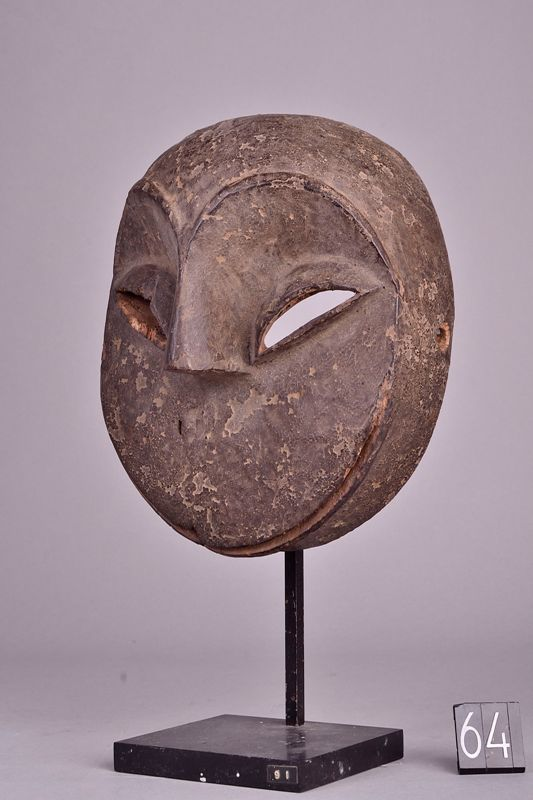
So'o Hemba Mask

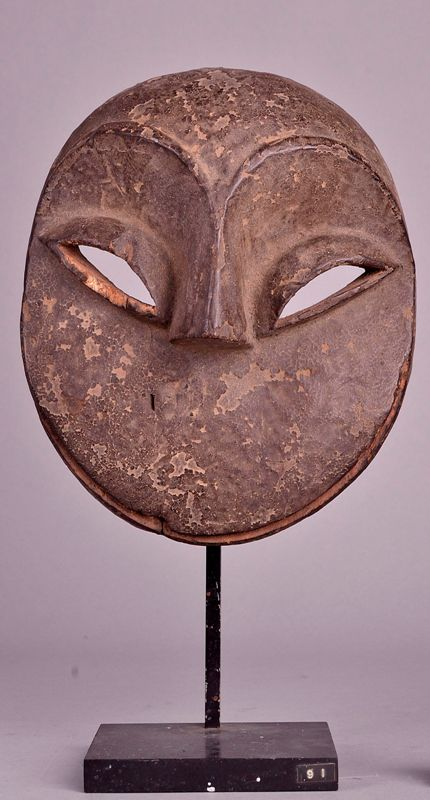
So'o Hemba Mask

== Sources ==
- Alesha, Matomah (2004). Sako ma: a look at the sacred monkey totem. Matam Press. ISBN 1-4116-0643-4.
- "Hemba Information". University of Iowa. Archived from the original on 2012-01-07.
- Macola, Giacomo (2002). The kingdom of Kazembe: history and politics in North-Eastern Zambia and Katanga to 1950. LIT Verlag Münster. ISBN 3-8258-5997-5.
- Mukenge, Tshilemalema (2002). Culture and customs of the Congo. Greenwood Publishing Group. p. 16. ISBN 0-313-31485-3.
- Olson, James Stuart (1996). The peoples of Africa: an ethnohistorical dictionary. Greenwood Publishing Group. ISBN 0-313-27918-7.
- Reefe, Thomas Q. (1981). The rainbow and the kings: a history of the Luba Empire to 1891. University of California Press. ISBN 0-520-04140-2.
- "Tribal African Art - Hembe (Bahembe)". Zyama.
