= Tumbwe people =

Ethnic group in Democratic Republic of the Congo

Regions with significant populations
- Katanga Province, Democratic Republic of the Congo: 100,000

Languages
- Sanga language

Religion
- traditional African religions

The Tumbwe people are a Bantu ethnic group living mostly in Tanganyika District of the Democratic Republic of the Congo.

The Tumbwe are a small group of about 100,000 people whose homeland is on the west shore of Lake Tanganyika. They take their name from a hereditary chief of the Sanga people. Other people in the region include the related Luba, Tabwa and Hemba.

The Tumbwe Chiefdom is an administrative area around the port of Kalemie, on Lake Tanganyika, where the Lukuga River leaves the lake. The Tumbwe, who live between the road leading south from Kalemie and the lake, may be the oldest settled group in the area. Traditionally the Tumbwe made their living by small-scale farming and by fishing on the lake. Today, growing numbers of Tumbwes work for wages in urban areas.

A Tumbwe chief will own a ceremonial staff, kept hidden when not in use, which indicates his rank and status. The staff is decorated with abstract design that tell of the chief's ancestry and is a residence for their spirits.
