= History of Zambia =

The history of Zambia experienced many stages from colonisation to independence from Britain on 24 October 1964. Northern Rhodesia became a British sphere of influence in the present-day region of Zambia in 1888, and was officially proclaimed a British protectorate in 1924. After many years of suggested mergers, Southern Rhodesia, Northern Rhodesia, and Nyasaland were merged into the British Federation of Rhodesia and Nyasaland.

In 1960, the British prime minister, Harold Macmillan, declared that the age of colonial rule in Africa was ending. Finally, in December 1963, the federation was dissolved, and the Republic of Zambia was formed out of Northern Rhodesia on 23 October 1964.

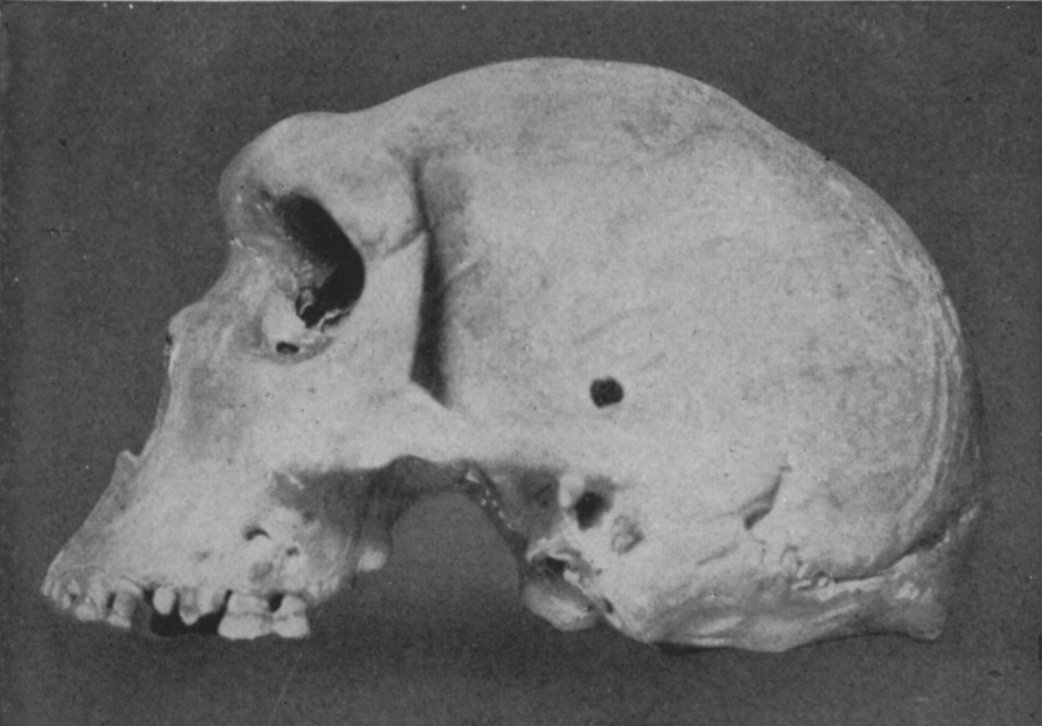
Skull of Broken Hill Man discovered in present-day Kabwe.

== Prehistoric era ==
Archaeological excavation work on the Zambezi Valley and Kalambo Falls show a succession of human cultures. In particular, ancient camping site tools near the Kalambo Falls have been radiocarbon dated to more than 36,000 years ago.

The fossil skull remains of Broken Hill Man, dated between 300,000 and 125,000 years BC, further shows that the area was inhabited by early humans.

== Khoisan and Batwa ==
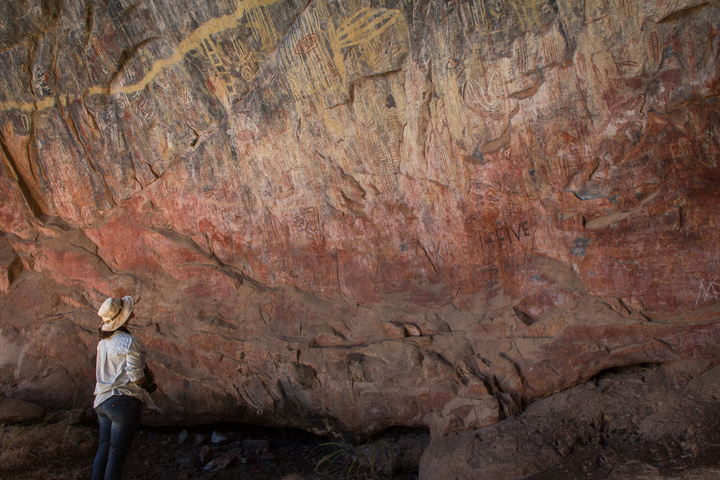
Ancient (but graffitied) Rock Art in Nsalu Cave, Kasanka National Park in North-Central Zambia.

The area of modern Zambia is known to have been inhabited by the Khoisan and Batwa peoples until around AD 300 when migrating Bantu began to settle around these areas. It is believed that the Khoisan people groups originated in East Africa and spread southwards around 150,000 years ago. The Twa people were split into two groups: The Kafwe Twa lived around the Kafue flats while the other, The Lukanga Twa lived around the Lukanga Swamp. Many of the ancient rock arts in Zambia like the Mwela Rock Paintings, Mumbwa Caves, and Nachikufu Cave are attributed to these early hunter-gatherer groups. The Khoisan, and more especially the Twa, formed a patron-client relationship with farming Bantu peoples across central and southern Africa but were eventually either displaced by or absorbed into the Bantu groups.

== Bantu (Abantu) ==
The Bantu people or Abantu (meaning people) are an enormous and diverse ethnolinguistic group that comprise the majority of people in much of East, Southern and Central Africa. Due to Zambia's location at the crossroads of Central Africa, Southern Africa, and the African Great Lakes, the history of the people that constitute modern Zambians is a history of these three regions.

Many of the historical events in these three regions happened simultaneously. Thus, Zambia's history, like many African nation's histories, cannot be presented perfectly chronologically. The early history of the peoples of modern Zambia is deduced from oral records, archaeology, and written records mostly from non-Africans.

=== Bantu origins ===
The Bantu people originally lived in West/Central Africa around what is today Cameroon. Around 4000 to 3000 years ago, they began a millennia-long expansion into much of the continent. This event has been called the Bantu Expansion, which was one of the largest human migrations in history. The Bantu are believed to have been the first to have brought iron working technology into large parts of Africa. The Bantu Expansion happened primarily through two routes: one was western via the Congo Basin and the other was eastern via the African Great Lakes.

=== First Bantu settlement ===
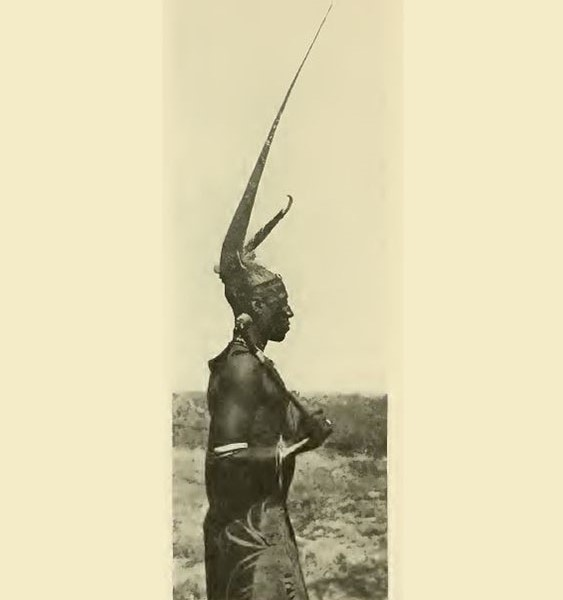
Ila Headman's son in Southern Zambia, Cattle formed an important part of their society.

According to recent scholarship by Nicholas Katanekwa, the earliest Bantu people in Zambia were the "New Kalundu" culture, arriving from the west along the Zambezi valley from the fourth century CE. These groups are associated with Guthrie group R, as well as the ancestors of the Shona, Venda, and especially Mbwela peoples.

The next Bantu people to arrive in Zambia came through the eastern route via the African Great Lakes.

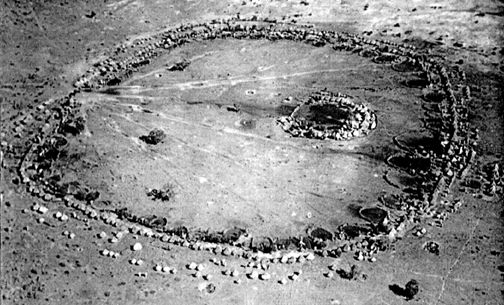
Enormous Ba-Ila settlement. These communities have been of interest to mathematicians due to their fractal pattern design.

They arrived later in the 1st millennium AD. Among them were the Tonga people (also called Ba-Tonga, "Ba-" meaning "men") and the Ba-Ila and other related groups who settled around Southern Zambia near Zimbabwe. According to Ba-Tonga oral records, they are believed to have come from the east near the "big sea".

They were later joined by the Ba-Tumbuka who settled around Eastern Zambia and Malawi.

These first Bantu people lived in large villages. They never had an organised unit under a chief or headman and worked as a community and help each other in times of field preparation for their crops. Villages moved around frequently as the soil became exhausted due to using the slash-and-burn technique of planting crops. They also kept large herds of cattle which formed an important part of their societies.

The first Bantu communities in Zambia were extremely self-sufficient. Many groups of people who encountered them were very impressed by this self-sufficiency. The early European missionaries that settled in Southern Zambia also noted the extreme independence of these Bantu societies, one of these missionaries noted:

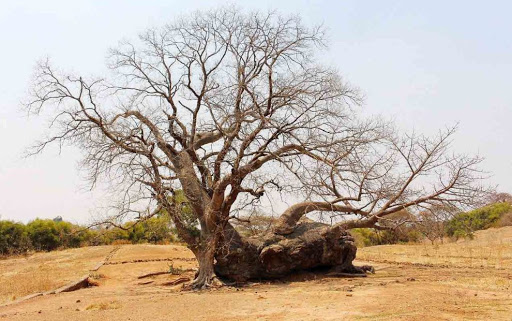
Ingombe Ilede trading post in Southern Zambia.

"[If] weapons for war, hunting, and domestic purposes are needed, the [Tonga] man goes to the hills and digs until he finds the iron ore. He smelts it and with the iron thus obtained makes axes, hoes, and other useful implements. He burns wood and makes charcoal for his forge. His bellows are made from the skins of animals and the pipes are clay tile, and the anvil and hammers are also pieces of the iron he has obtained. He moulds, welds, shapes, and performs all the work of the ordinary blacksmith."

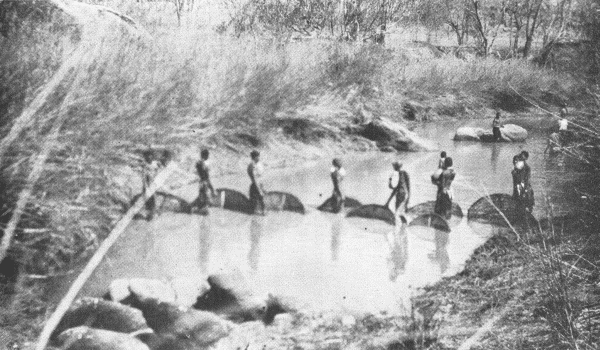
Batonga fisherwomen in Southern Zambia. Women have and continue to play important roles in many African societies.

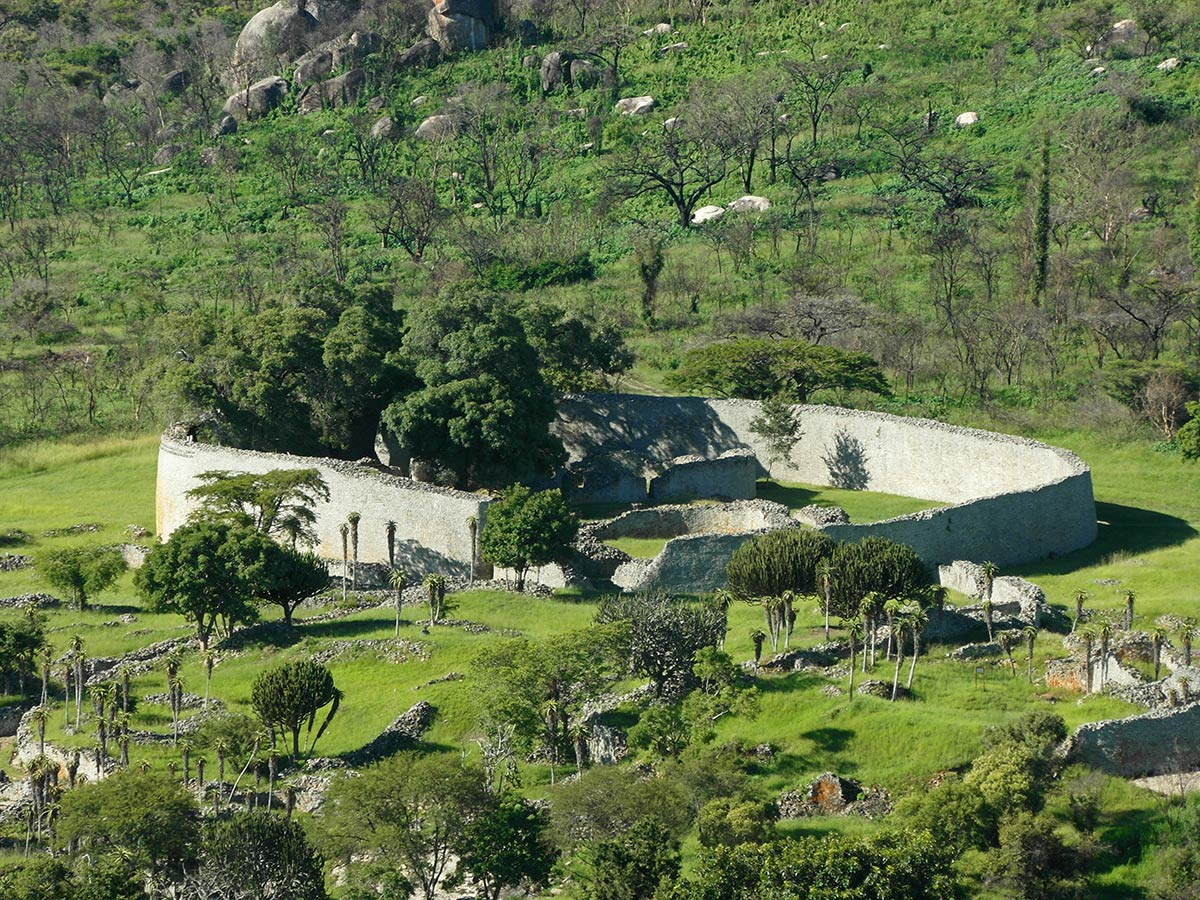
Ruins of Great Zimbabwe, Kalanga/Shona rulers of this Kingdom dominated trade at Ingombe Ilede.

These early Bantu settlers also participated in the trade at the site Ingombe Ilede (which translates as "sleeping cow" in Chi-Tonga because the fallen baobab tree appears to resembles a cow) in Southern Zambia, at this trading site they met numerous Kalanga/Shona traders from Great Zimbabwe and Swahili traders from the East African Swahili Coast. Ingombe Ilede was one of the most important trading posts for rulers of Great Zimbabwe, others being the Swahili port cities like of Sofala.

The goods traded at Ingombe Ilede included: fabrics, beads, gold, and bangles. Some of these items came from what is today southern Democratic Republic of Congo and Kilwa Kisiwani while others as far away as India, China and the Arab World. The African traders were later joined by the Portuguese in the 16th century.

The decline of Great Zimbabwe, due to increasing trade competition from other Kalanga/Shona kingdoms like Khami and Mutapa, spelt the end of Ingombe Ilede.

=== Further Bantu settlement ===
The third mass settlement of Bantu people into Zambia was of people groups that are believed to have taken the central-western route of the Bantu migration through the Congo Basin. These Bantu people spent the majority of their existence in what is today the Democratic Republic of Congo and are ancestors of the majority of modern Zambians.

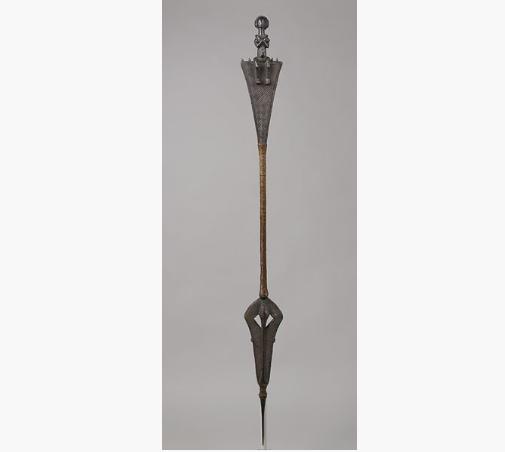
Seated female Staffs of office (Kibango), were displayed by Luba kings. In Luba society, women's bodies were considered the ultimate vessels of spiritual power.

While it was previously speculated that the Bemba people or AbaBemba have a strong ancient connection to the Kongo Kingdom through BaKongo ruler Mwene Kongo VIII Mvemba this, is not supported by evidence.

Luba-Lunda States

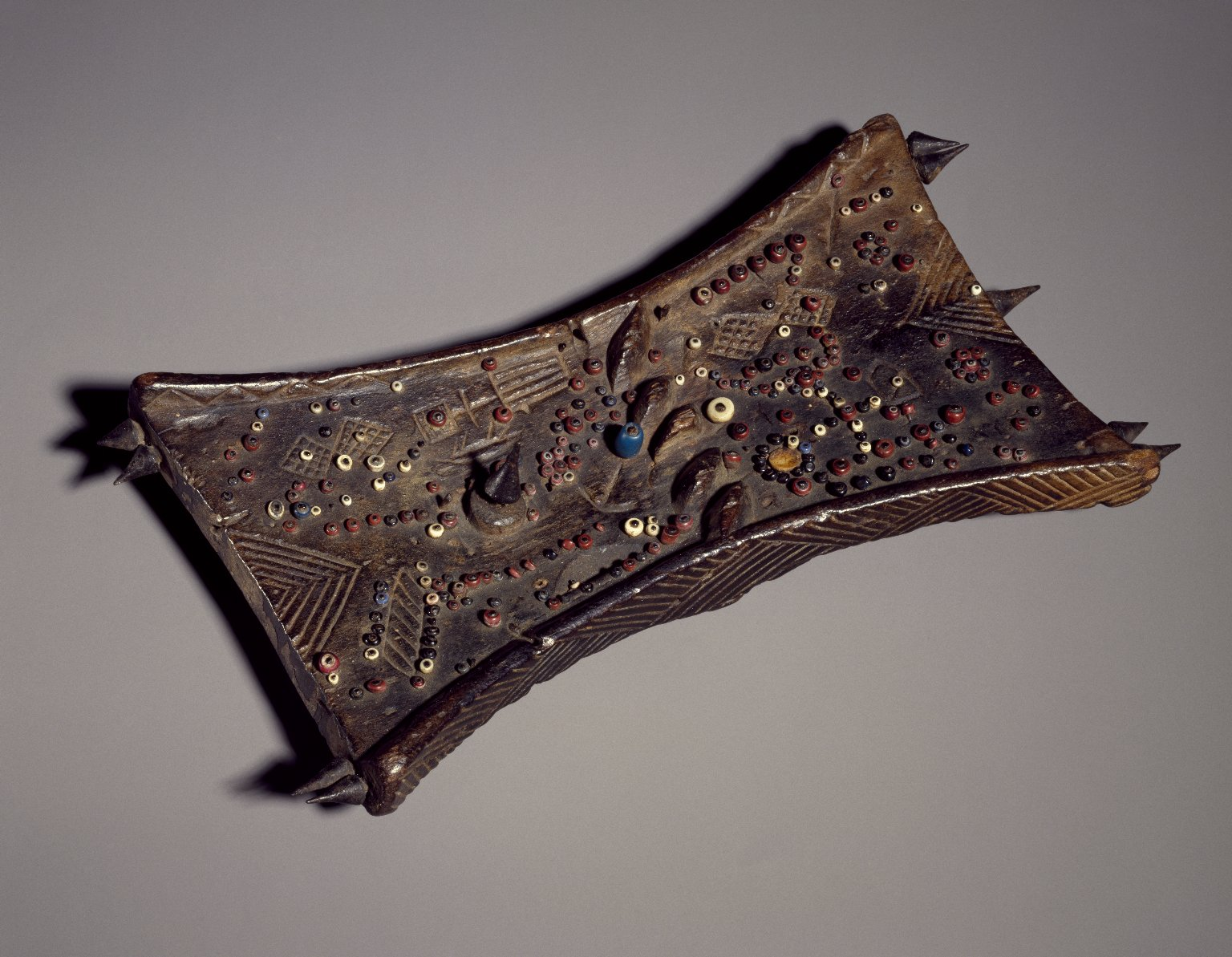
Lukasa memory board, was used by members of Mbudye (an association of groits in charge of maintaining Baluba history)

The Bemba, along with other related groups like the Lamba, Bisa, Senga, Kaonde, Swaka, Nkoya and Soli, formed integral parts of the Luba Kingdom in Upemba part of the Democratic Republic of Congo and have a strong relation to the BaLuba people. The area which the Luba Kingdom occupied has been inhabited by early farmers and iron-workers since the 300's AD. Over time these communities learned to use nets, harpoons, make dugout canoes, clear canals through swamps and make dams as high as 2.5 meters.

As a result, they grew a diverse economy trading fish, copper and iron items, and salt for goods from other parts of Africa like the Swahili Coast and, later on, the Portuguese. From these communities arose the Luba Kingdom in the 14th century.

The Luba Kingdom was a large kingdom with a centralised government and smaller independent chiefdoms. It had large trading networks that linked the forests in the Congo Basin and the mineral-rich plateaus of what is today Copperbelt Province and stretched from the Atlantic Coast to the Indian Ocean Coast. The arts were also held in high esteem in the kingdom and artisans where held in high regards.

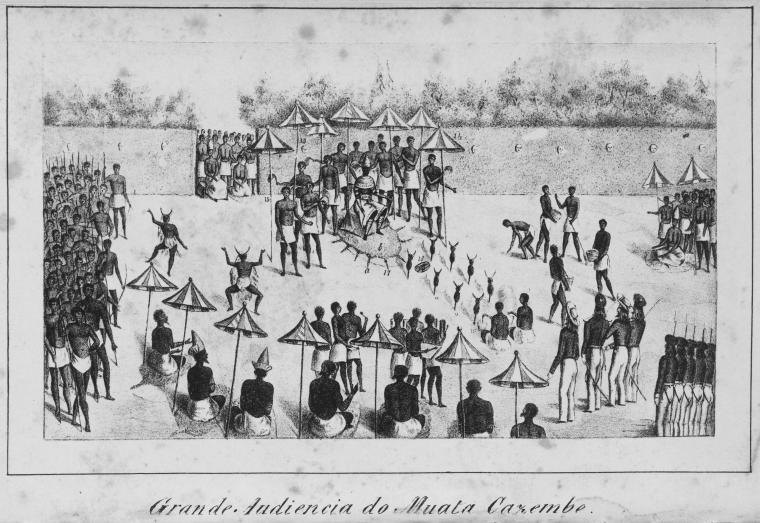
Drawing of the ruler of Lunda, Mwata Kazembe, receiving Portuguese in the royal courtyard in the 1800s

The Luba Kingdom literature was also well developed. One renowned Luba genesis story that articulated the distinction between two types of Luba emperors as follows:

"Nkongolo Mwamba, the red king, and Ilunga Mbidi Kiluwe, a prince of legendary black complexion. Nkongolo Mwamba is the drunken and cruel despot, Ilunga Mbidi Kiluwe, the refined and gentle prince. Nkongolo the red is a man without manners, a man who eats in public, gets drunk, and cannot control himself, whereas [Ilunga] Mbidi Kiluwe is a man of reservation, obsessed with good manners; he does not eat in public, controls his language and his behaviour, and keeps a distance from the vices and modus vivendi of ordinary people. Nkongolo Mwamba symbolizes the embodiment of tyranny, whereas Mbidi Kiluwe remains the admired caring and compassionate kin."

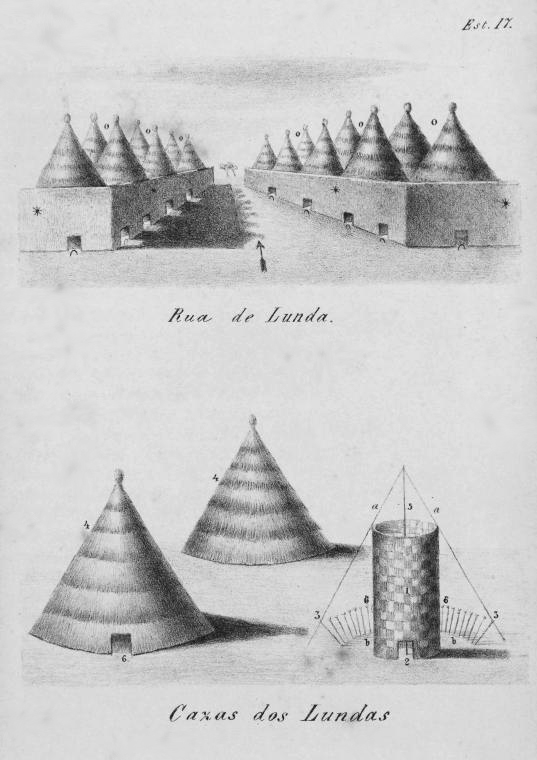
A drawing of Lunda houses by a Portuguese. The size of the doorways relative to the building emphasizes the scale of the buildings.

In the same region of Southern Congo the Lunda people were made into a satellite of the Luba empire and adopted forms of Luba culture and governance and thus became the Lunda empire to the south. According to Lunda genesis myths, a Luba hunter named Chibinda Ilunga son of Ilunga Mbidi Kiluwe introduced the Luba model of statecraft to the Lunda sometime around 1600 when he married a local Lunda princess named Lueji and was granted control of her kingdom. Most rulers who claimed descent from Luba ancestors were integrated into the Luba empire. The Lunda kings, however, remained separate and actively expanded their political and economic dominance over the region.

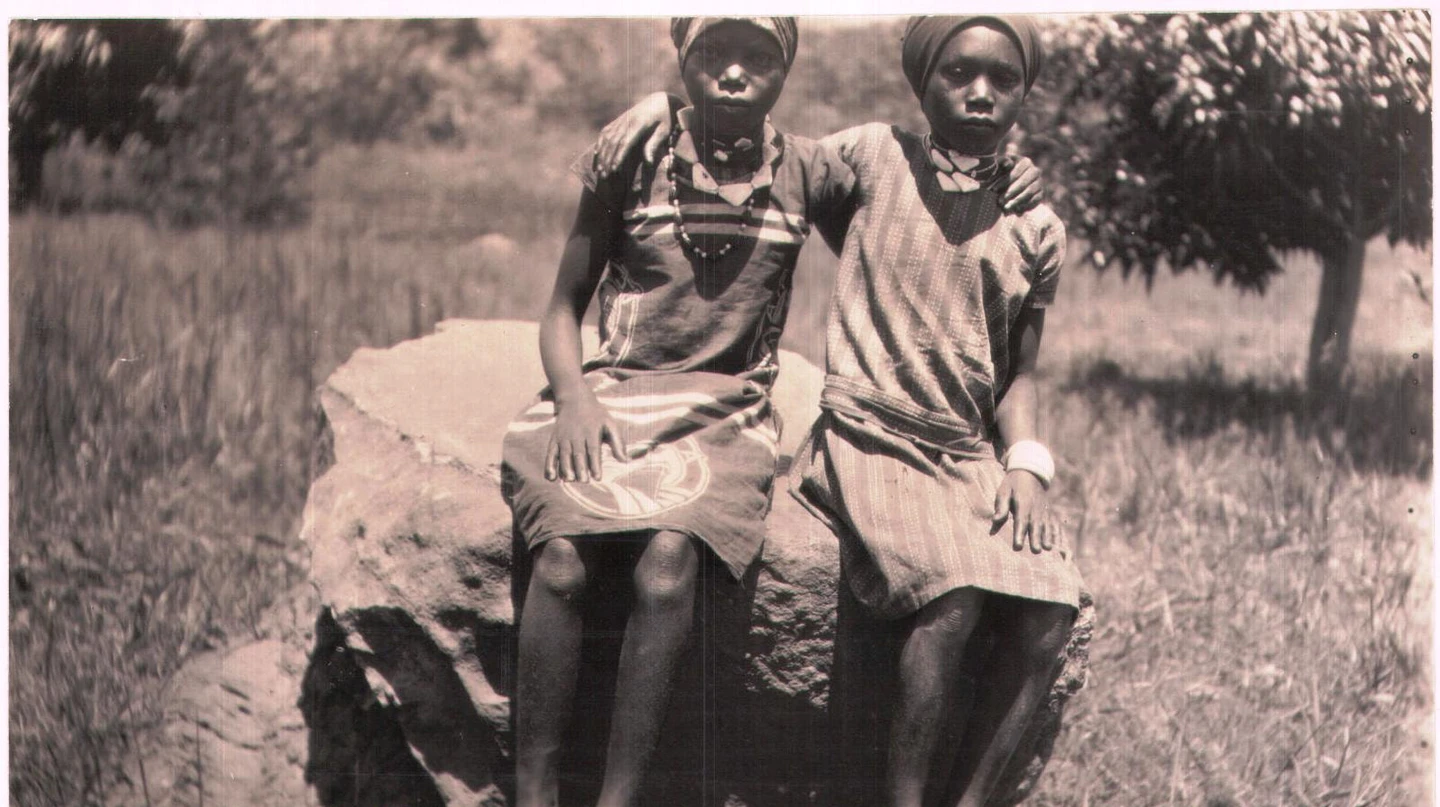
Young Bemba girls. AbaBemba women made and adorned jewellery for beauty and belonging in their culture.

The Lunda, like its parent state Luba, also traded with both coasts, the Atlantic and Indian Ocean. With ruler Mwaant Yaav Naweej had established trade routes to the Atlantic coast and initiated direct contact with European traders eager for slaves and forest products and controlling the regional copper trade, and settlements around Lake Mweru regulated commerce from the East African coast.

The Luba-Lunda states eventually declined as a result of both Atlantic slave trade in the west and Indian Ocean slave trade in the east and wars with breakaway factions of the kingdoms. The Chokwe, a group that is highly related to the Luvale and formed a Lunda satellite state, initially suffered from the European demand for slaves but once the broke away from the Lunda State, they defeated the previous parent state and became notorious slave traders, exporting slaves to both coasts. The Chokwe eventually were defeated by the other ethnic groups and the Portuguese.

This instability caused the collapse of the Luba-Lunda States and a dispersal of people into various parts of Zambia from the Democratic Republic of the Congo. The majority of Zambians trace their ancestry to the Luba-Lunda and surrounding Central African states.

Maravi Confederacy

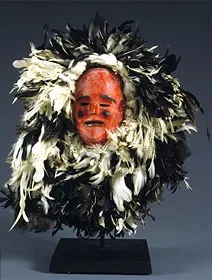
This type of elaborately feathered Nyau mask was used for the recall of spirits. It is called Nchawa.

In the 1200s, before the founding of the Luba-Lunda states, a group of Bantu people started migrating from the Congo basin to Lake Mweru then finally settled around Lake Malawi. These migrants are believed to have been one of the inhabitants around the Upemba area in the Democratic Republic of Congo. By the 1400s these groups of migrants collectively called the Maravi, most prominently among them was the Chewa people, started assimilating other Bantu groups like the Tumbuka.

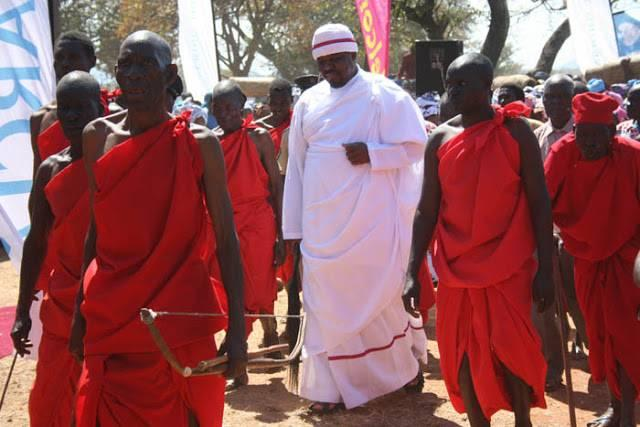
The Kalonga of the Chewa today descends from the Kalonga (rulers) of the Maravi Empire.

In 1480 the Maravi Empire was founded by the Kalonga (paramount chief of the Maravi) from the Phiri clan one of the main clans with the others being Banda, Mwale and Nkhoma. The Maravi Empire stretched from the Indian Ocean through what today is Mozambique to Zambia and large parts of Malawi. The political organization of the Maravi resembled the Luba and is believed to have originated from there, the primary export of the Maravi was Ivory which was transported to Swahili brokers.

Iron was also manufactured and exported. In the 1590s the Portuguese endeavoured to monopolize the Maravi export trade. This attempt was met with outrage by the Maravi of Lundu who released their WaZimba armed force. The WaZimba sacked the Portuguese trade towns of Tete, Sena and various other towns.

The Maravi are also believed to have brought the traditions that would become Nyau secret society from the Upemba. The Nyau form the cosmology or indigenous religion of the people of Maravi. The Nyau society consists of ritual dance performances and masks used for the dances, this belief system spread around the region.

The Maravi went into decline due to succession disputes within the confederacy, attack by the Ngoni and slave raids from the Yao.

Mutapa Empire & Mfecane

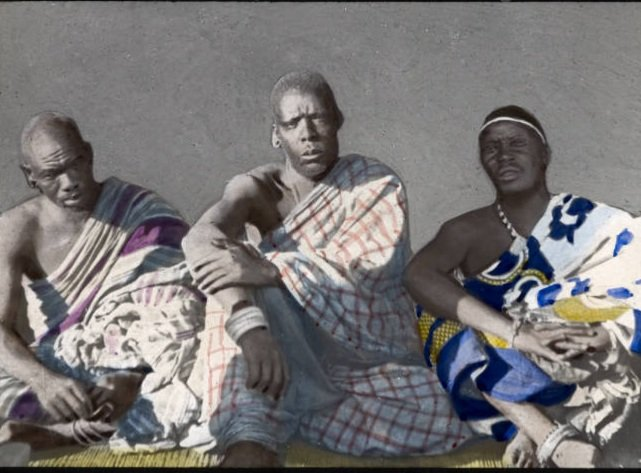
Three young Ngoni chiefs. The Ngoni made their way into Eastern Zambia from KwaZulu in South Africa. They eventually assimilated into the local ethnic groups.

As Great Zimbabwe was in decline. One of its princes, Nyatsimba Mutota, broke away from the state forming a new empire called Mutapa. The title of Mwene Mutapa, meaning "Ravager of the Lands", was bestowed on him and subsequent rulers.

The Mutapa Empire ruled territory between the Zambezi and Limpopo rivers, in what is now Zambia, Zimbabwe and Mozambique, from the 14th to the 17th century. By its peak, Mutapa had conquered the Dande area of the Tonga and Tavara. The Mutapa Empire predominately engaged in the Indian Ocean transcontinental trade with and via the WaSwahili. They primary exported gold and ivory for silk and ceramics from Asia.

Like their contemporaries in Maravi, Mutapa had problems with the arriving Portuguese traders. The peak of this uneasy relationship was reached when the Portuguese attempted to influence the kingdoms internal affairs by establishing markets in the kingdom and converting the population to Christianity. This action caused outrage by the Muslim WaSwahili living in the capital. This chaos gave the Portuguese the excuse they were searching for to warrant an attack on the kingdom and try to control its gold mines and ivory routes. This attack failed when the Portuguese succumbed to disease along the Zambezi river.

In the 1600s, internal disputes and civil war began the decline of Mutapa. The weakened kingdom was finally conquered by the Portuguese and was eventually taken over by rival Shona states.

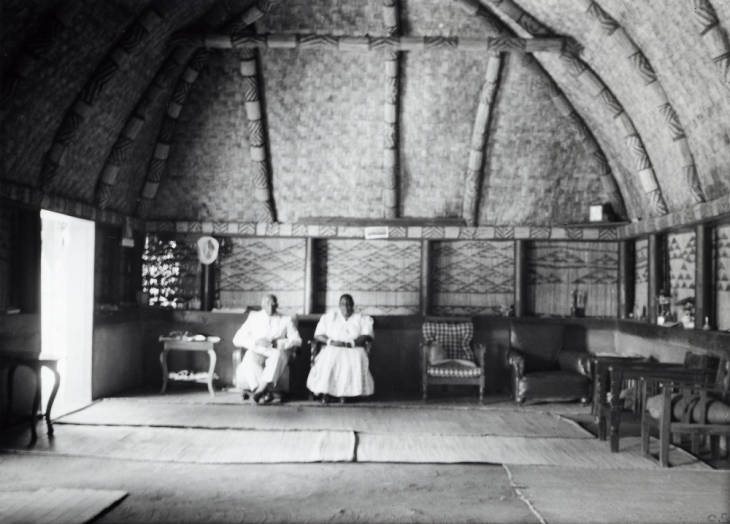
Inside the palace of the Litunga, ruler of the Lozi. Due to the flooding on the Zambezi, the Litunga has two palaces one of which is on higher ground. The movement of Litunga to higher land is celebrated at the Kuomboka Ceremony

It is hypothesised by Julian Cobbing that the presence of early Europeans slave trading and attempts to control resources in various parts of Bantu Speaking Africa caused the gradual militarization of the people in the region. This can be observed with the Maravi's WaZimba warrior cast who, once defeating the Portuguese, remained quite militaristic afterwards.

The Portuguese presence in the region was also a major reason for the founding of the Rozvi Empire, a breakaway state of Mutapa. The ruler of the Rozvi, Changamire Dombo, became one of the most powerful leaders in South-Central Africa's history. Under his leadership, the Rozvi defeated the Portuguese and expelled them from their trading posts along the Zambezi river.

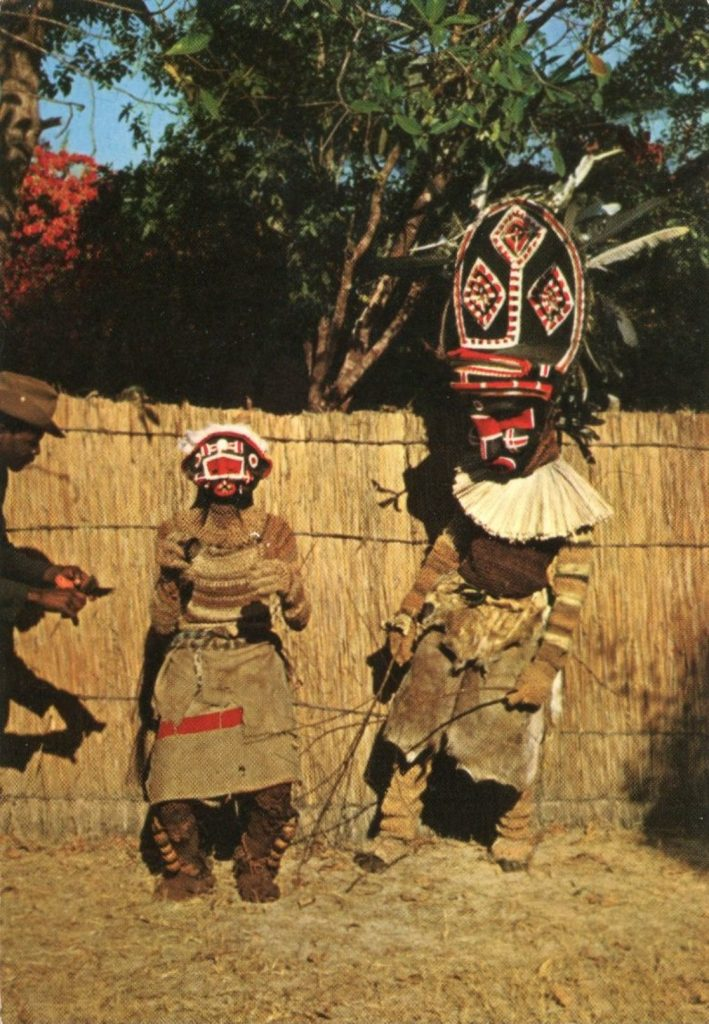
Makishi dancer, found in North-Western Zambia, represent spirits of a deceased who returns to assist the living

But perhaps the most notable instance of this increased militarization was the rise of the Zulu under the leadership of Shaka. Pressures from the English colonialists in the Cape and increased militarization of the Zulu resulted in the Mfecane (the crushing). The Zulu expanded by assimilating the women and children of tribes they defeated, if the men of these Nguni tribes escaped slaughter, they used the military tactics of the Zulu to attack other groups.

This caused mass displacements, wars and raids throughout Southern, Central and Eastern Africa as Nguni or Ngoni tribes made their way throughout the region and is referred to as the Mfecane. The arriving Nguni under the leadership of Zwagendaba crossed the Zambezi river moving northwards. The Ngoni were the final blow to the already weakened Maravi Empire. Many Nguni eventually settled around what is today Zambia, Malawi, Mozambique and Tanzania and assimilated into neighboring tribes.

In the western part of Zambia, another Southern African group of Sotho-Tswana heritage called the Kololo manage to conquer the local inhabitants who were migrants from the fallen Luba and Lunda states called the Luyana or Aluyi. The Luyana established the Barotse Kingdom on the floodplains of the Zambezi upon their arrival from Katanga. Under the Kololo, the Kololo language was imposed upon the Luyana until the Luyana revolted and overthrew the Kololo by this time the Luyana language was largely forgotten and a new hybrid language emerged, SiLozi and the Luyana began to refer to themselves as Lozi.

At the end of the 18th century, some of the Mbunda migrated to Barotseland, Mongu upon the migration of among others, the Ciyengele. The Aluyi and their leader, the Litunga Mulambwa, especially valued the Mbunda for their fighting ability.

By the late 19th century, most of the various peoples of Zambia were established in their current areas.

== Colonial period ==
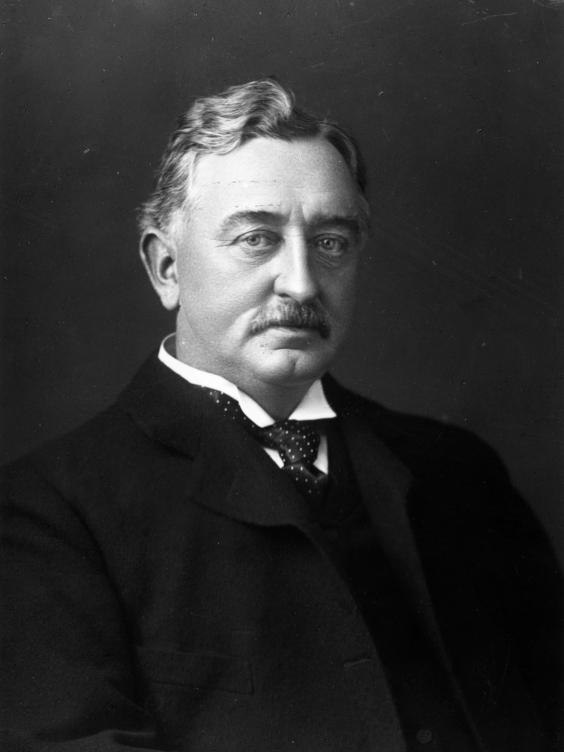
Cecil Rhodes

In 1888, Cecil Rhodes who was spearheading British commercial and political interests in Central Africa, obtained a mineral rights concessions from local chiefs. In the same year, Northern and Southern Rhodesia, now Zambia and Zimbabwe, were proclaimed a British sphere of influence. In the beginning, the territory was administered by Rhodes' British South Africa Company (BSAC), which showed little interest in the province and used it mainly as a source of labour.

The most important factor in the colony's economy was copper. The discovery of which is due partly to an American prospector, Frederick Russell Burnham, who in 1895 led and oversaw the massive Northern Territories (BSA) Exploration Co. expedition which established that major copper deposits existed in Central Africa. Along the Kafue River in then Northern Rhodesia, Burnham saw many similarities to copper deposits he had worked in the United States, and he encountered natives wearing copper bracelets.

In 1923 the British government decided not to renew the company's charter. As a result, Southern Rhodesia was annexed formally and granted self-government in 1923. After negotiations, the administration of Northern Rhodesia was transferred to the British Colonial Office in 1924 as a protectorate, with Livingstone as capital. The capital was transferred to the more central Lusaka in 1935. A Legislative Council was established, of which five members were elected by the small European minority (only 4,000 people), but none by the African population.

Flag of Northern Rhodesia

In 1928, enormous copper deposits were discovered in the region which then became known as the Copperbelt. This transformed Northern Rhodesia from a prospective land of colonization for white farmers to a copper exporter. By 1938, the country produced 13% of the world's copper extraction. The sector was developed by two companies: the Anglo American Corporation (AAC) and the South African Rhodesian Selection Trust (RST), who controlled the sector until independence.

The poor safety record and increased taxes triggered the African mineworkers' Copperbelt strike in 1935. The strike was crushed by the authorities and six miners were killed.

During the Second World War, white miners went out on strike in 1940; realizing the importance of their products for the war, they demanded higher salaries. This strike was followed by another by African mine workers.

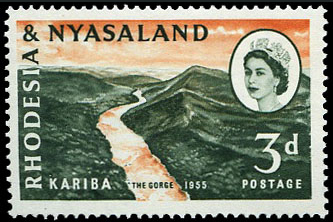
Stamp with portrait of Queen Elizabeth II, 1955

Even before the war, there had been talks about merging the two Rhodesias, but the process had been halted by the British authorities, and brought to an absolute stop by the war. Finally, in 1953, both Rhodesias were joined with Nyasaland (now Malawi) to form the Central African Federation. Northern Rhodesia was the centre of much of the turmoil and crises that afflicted the federation in its last years, including the Murder of Lilian Burton. At the core of the controversy were insistent African demands for greater participation in government and European fears of losing political control.

A two-stage election held in October and December 1962 resulted in an African majority in the legislative council and an uneasy coalition between the two African nationalist parties. The council passed resolutions calling for Northern Rhodesia's secession from the federation and demanding full internal self-b under a new constitution, and a new national assembly based on a broader, more democratic franchise. On 31 December 1963, the federation was dissolved, and Northern Rhodesia became the Republic of Zambia on 24 October 1964.

== Independence ==
A book published by the government upon independence

At independence, despite its considerable mineral wealth, Zambia faced major challenges. Domestically, there were few trained and educated Zambians capable of running the government, and the economy was largely dependent on foreign expertise. Most of Zambia's neighbouring countries were still colonies or under white minority rule.

The United National Independence Party (UNIP) won the pre-independence elections, gaining 55 of the 75 seats. The Zambian African National Congress won 10 seats, and the National Progressive Party won all the 10 seats reserved for whites. Kenneth Kaunda was elected Prime Minister, and later the same year president, as the country adopted a presidential system.

Kaunda adopted an ideology of African socialism, close to that of Julius Nyerere in Tanzania. Economical policies focused on central planning and nationalisation, and a system of one party rule was put in place.

=== Towards one-party rule ===
In 1968 Kaunda was re-elected as president. During the following years, Zambia adopted a one party system. In 1972 all political parties except UNIP were banned, and this was formalized in a new constitution that was adopted in 1973. The constitution framed a system called "one-party participatory democracy", which in practice, meant that UNIP became the sole political factor in the country. It provided for a strong president and a unicameral National Assembly. National policy was formulated by the Central Committee of UNIP. The cabinet executed the central committee's policy. In legislative elections, only candidates running for UNIP were allowed to participate. Even though inter-party competition was out of question, the contest for seats within UNIP was energetic. In the presidential elections, the only candidate allowed to run was the one elected as president of UNIP at the party's general conference. In this way Kaunda was re-elected unopposed with a yes or no vote in 1973, 1978, 1983 and 1988.

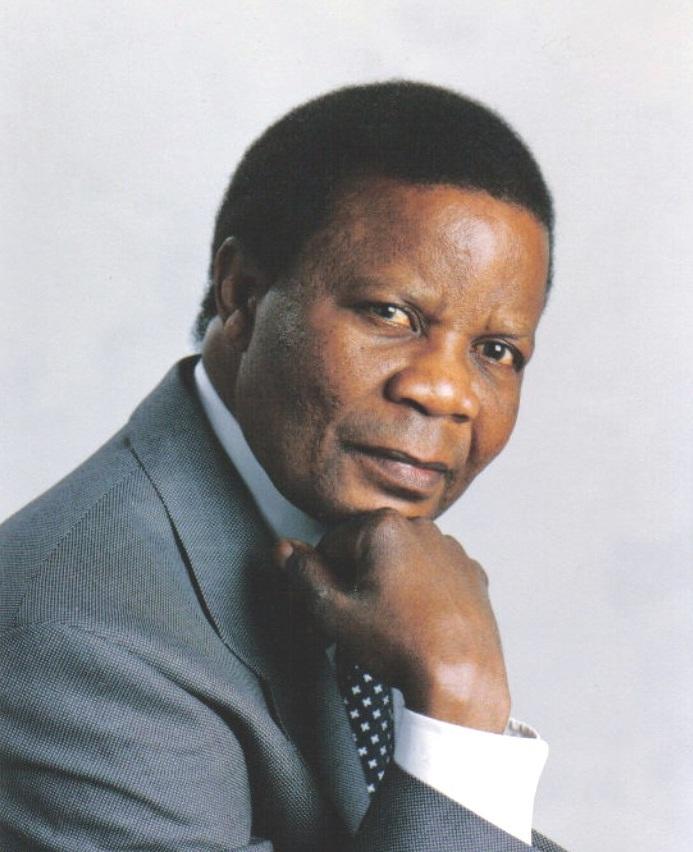
S.M Chisembele, Cabinet Minister, Western Province

This did not, however, mean that there was no dissension to the imposition of a one-party rule in the country or within UNIP. Sylvester Mwamba Chisembele who was Cabinet Minister for Western Province (previously Barotse Province) together with UNIP leaders from 7 out of the 8 Provinces established a Committee of 14. The objective of the Committee of 14 which consisted two leaders from each of the 7 provinces was the establishment of a democratically elected council of two leaders from each province to rule the country by consensus with the President as Head of State. If this had been achieved, it would have meant the curtailing of the absolute power residing in President Kaunda. The Committee of 14 attended a meeting in State House at which President Kaunda agreed to consider their proposals. However, later he banned the Committee of 14 and this action was followed by the suspension of Sylvester Chisembele and several leaders were sacked. Chisembele later rejoined the Cabinet as Minister for Eastern Province and two years later in 1977 he was transferred in the same position to the Copperbelt Province, where the political situation was tense, especially so because of the forthcoming General Elections. Simon M. Kapwepwe and Harry Mwaanga Nkumbula, who, before the declaration of a One Party State, had been leaders of the UPP and ANC political parties respectively, had joined UNIP with the intention of challenging for the Presidency. However, their attempt to challenge President Kaunda for the Presidency on the UNIP ticket failed as both were prevented and disqualified by the manipulations of President Kaunda, who stood unopposed. Simon Kapwepwe and Harry Nkumbula challenged the resultant 1978 election of President Kaunda in the High Court, but unsurprisingly their action was unsuccessful.

=== Economy and the copper crisis ===
After independence, Zambia adopted a left-wing economic policy. The economy was, to some extent, run by central planning under five year plans. Private companies were nationalised and incorporated into large state-owned conglomerates. The government's goal was to be self-sufficient, which it sought to achieve through import substitution. At first, the plan worked and the economy grew steadily. However, in the mid-1970s, the economy started to decline drastically. During the period between 1975 and 1990 Zambia's economy dropped by approximately 30%.

To deal with the crisis, Zambia took big loans from the International Monetary Fund and the Worldbank hoping that copper prices would rise again soon, instead of issuing structural reforms.

=== Foreign policy ===
Internationally, Zambia's sympathies lay with forces opposing colonial or white-dominated rule. During the next decade, it actively supported movements such as the National Unions for the Total Independence of Angola (UNITA) under the independence war and under the subsequent civil war, the Zimbabwe African People's Union (ZAPU) in Southern Rhodesia, and the African National Congress (ANC) in their struggle against apartheid in the Republic of South Africa, and the South-West Africa People's Organization (SWAPO) in their struggle for independence for Namibia. Zambia also hosted some of the movements. For instance, the ANC exile headquarters were in Lusaka, and ZAPU had a military base in Zambia. This resulted in security problems, as the South Africa and South Rhodesia raided targets inside Zambia on several occasions.

Rhodesian counterinsurgency operations extended into Zambia after Zimbabwe People's Revolutionary Army (ZIPRA) rebels shot down two unarmed Vickers Viscount civilian airliners (Air Rhodesia Flight 825 on 3 September 1978 and Air Rhodesia Flight 827 on 12 February 1979) with Soviet-supplied SA-7 heat-seeking missiles. In retaliation for the shooting down of Flight 825 in September 1978, the Rhodesian Air Force attacked the ZIPRA guerrilla base at Westlands farm near Lusaka in October 1978, warning Zambian forces by radio not to interfere.

Conflicts with Rhodesia resulted in the closing of Zambia's borders with that country and severe problems with international transport and power supply. However, the Kariba hydroelectric station on the Zambezi River provided sufficient capacity to satisfy the country's requirements for electricity. TAZARA, a railway to the Tanzanian port of Dar es Salaam, built with Chinese assistance, reduced Zambian dependence on the railway line south to South Africa and west through an increasingly war-ravaged Angola.

Civil strife in neighbouring Mozambique and Angola created large numbers of refugees, many of whom fled to Zambia.

Internationally, Zambia was an active member of the Non-Aligned Movement (NAM), and hosted a summit in Lusaka in 1970. Kenneth Kaunda served as the movements chairman 1970–1973. Among the NAM countries Zambia was especially close to Yugoslavia. Outside the NAM Zambia also had close relations with the People's Republic of China.

In the Second Congo War, Zambia backed Zimbabwe and the Congo but did not participate as a belligerent.

== Multi-party democracy ==
=== End of one-party rule ===
One party rule and the declining economy created disappointment among the people. Several strikes hit the country in 1981. The government responded by arresting several union leaders, among them Frederick Chiluba. In 1986 and 1987, protests arose again in Lusaka and the Copperbelt. These were followed by riots over rising food prices in 1990, in which at least 30 people were killed. The same year, the state owned radio claimed that Kaunda had been removed from office by the army. This was not true, and the 1990 Zambian coup d'état attempt failed.

These extensive protests made Kaunda realise the need for reform. He promised a referendum on multiparty democracy, and lifted the ban on political parties. This resulted in the quick formation of eleven new parties. Among these Movement for Multiparty Democracy (MMD), led by former union leader Frederick Chiluba, was the most important. After pressure for the new parties the referendum was canceled in favour of direct multiparty election.

=== Frederick Chiluba and the MMD ===
After a new constitution had been drafted, elections were held in 1991. They were generally regarded to have been free and fair, and Chiluba won 76% of the presidential vote, and the MMD 125 of the 150 seats in the National Assembly, with UNIP taking the remaining 25.

Economically, Chiluba, despite being a former union leader, stood to the right of Kaunda. With support from the International Monetary Fund and World Bank, to which Zambia was heavily indebted, he liberalised the economy by restricting government interference, re-privatising state-owned enterprises, such as the important copper mining industry, and removing subsidies on various commodities, most notably on corn meal.

When one party rule was first abolished in 1991, many expected a more democratic future for Zambia. These expectations were, however, clouded by the MMD's treatment of the opposition. Questionable amendments of the constitution and detentions of political opponents caused major criticism, and some donor countries, i.e., the United Kingdom and Denmark, withdrew their aid.

==== Coups and emergencies ====
In 1993, the government-owned newspaper, The Times of Zambia, reported a story about a secret UNIP plan to take control of government by unconstitutional means, called the "Zero Option Plan". The plan included industrial unrest, promotion of violence and organisations of mass protests. UNIP did not deny the existence of such a plan, but underlined that it was not a part of their official policy, but the views of extremists within the party. The government responded by declaring a state of emergency and putting 26 people into detention. Of these, seven, including Kenneth Kaunda's son Wezi Kaunda were charged with offences against the security of the state. The rest were released.

Prior to the 1996 elections, UNIP formed an alliance with six other opposition parties. Kenneth Kaunda had earlier retired from politics, but after internal turbulence in the party due to the "Zero Option Plan" scandal, he returned, replacing his own successor Kebby Musokotwane. Chiluba's government then amended the constitution, banning people whose parents were not both Zambian citizens from becoming president. This was directly aimed at Kaunda, whose parents were both from Malawi. In protest UNIP and its allies boycotted the elections, which were then easily won by Chiluba and the MMD.

In 1997, matters escalated. On 28 October a coup d'état attempt took place, as a group of army commanders took control over the national radio station, broadcasting a message stating that Chiluba was no longer president. The coup was brought to an end by regular forces, after Chiluba had again declared a state of emergency. One person was killed during the operation. After the failed coup, the police arrested at least 84 people accused of involvement. Among these were Kenneth Kaunda and Dean Mungomba, leader of the opposition party the Zambia Democratic Congress. The arrests were condemned and criticised as illegal inside as well as outside Zambia, and accusations of torture were made as well. Kaunda was released in June the following year, but 54 of the soldiers who took part in the coup were convicted and sentenced to death The sentence was appealed to Zambia's supreme court in 2003, which commuted the death sentence for ten soldiers but upheld the death sentence for the other 44. However in 2004, Zambia's president Levy Mwanawasa commuted the death sentence for 22 of the coup plotters and released 14 of them as having served their prison sentence. One of the coup leaders, Jack Chiti, was also released on humanitarian grounds due to cancer.

=== 2001 elections ===
Prior to the elections in 2001, Chiluba tried to change the constitution to allow him to run for a third term. He was forced to step back on this point after protest from within the party as well as from the Zambian public. He attempted to alter the constitution to allow him to run for a third term in office in 2001, but stood down after huge public protests. His successor was Levy Patrick Mwanawasa.

=== After 2008 ===
From 2011 to 2014, Zambia's president had been Michael Sata, until Sata died on 28 October 2014. He was the second Zambian leader to die in office after Levy Mwanawasa in 2008. Rupiah Banda was the president of Zambia after the death of Mwanawasa from 2008 to 2011. He lost the election to Michael Sata in 2011. After Sata's death, Vice President Guy Scott, a Zambian of Scottish descent, became acting President of Zambia. On 24 January 2015, it was announced that Edgar Chagwa Lungu had won the election to become the 6th President in a tightly contested race. In August 2016 Zambian general election, president Edgar Lungu won re-election narrowly in the first round of the election. The opposition had allegations of fraud and the governing Patriotic Front (PF) rejected the allegations made by opposition UPND party.

In August 2021 presidential election, opposition leader Hakainde Hichilema defeated the incumbent, President Edgar Lungu, by a landslide. On 24 August 2021, Hakainde Hichilema was sworn in as the new President of Zambia. In August 2026, Hakainde Hichilema was elected for a second term, with around 60% of the votes.

== See also ==
- Bibliography of the history of Zambia
- A history of Zambia
- Kazembe
- Kenneth Kaunda
- Monuments and Historic Sites of Zambia
- Politics of Zambia
- Lusaka history and timeline
