= List of Rhodesian periodicals =

This is a list of periodicals published in Rhodesia (today Zimbabwe). It includes periodicals published in Southern Rhodesia, before Rhodesia declared independence.

== Academic journals ==
Journal	Period	Topic	Publisher	Frequency	Ref.
The Pioneer	1973–?	History	Rhodesia Pioneers' and Early Settlers' Society	Annually	
Rhodesia Agricultural Journal	1903–79	Agriculture	Ministry of Agriculture	Bi-monthly	
Rhodesian History	1970–78	History	Central Africa Historical Association	Annually	
Rhodesian Journal of Agricultural Research	1963–79	Agriculture	Ministry of Agriculture	Bi-monthly	
Rhodesian Journal of Economics	1967–	Economics	Rhodesian Economic Society	Quarterly	
Rhodesian Mining Journal	1928–?	Mining		Monthly	
Rhodesian Prehistory	1963–	Archaeology; Prehistory	Prehistory Society of Rhodesia		
Rhodesia Science News	1967–	Science	Rhodesia Scientific Association	Monthly	
Rhodesiana	1956–79	History	The Rhodesiana Society	Bi-annually	
Zambezia	1969–2005	Humanities	University of Rhodesia	Annually	

== Magazines ==
Journal	Est.	Topic	Publisher	Frequency	Ref.
Bateleur	1976–80	RhAF affairs	Rhodesian Air Force		
Bee Line	1954–?	Beekeeping	Rhodesian Beekeepers' Association		
Central African Examiner	1957–65	Contemporary affairs	Rhodesian Selection Trust	Monthly	
The Cheetah	1960s–1980	Rhodesian Light Infantry	Rhodesian Light Infantry		
Chirimo	1968–70	Poetry	Colin and Olan Style	Thrice-yearly	
Horizon	?	Contemporary affairs	Rhodesian Selection Trust		
Illustrated Life Rhodesia	1968–78	Contemporary affairs	Graham Publishing Company	Fortnightly	
Jewish Guild Journal	1919–21; 1931–38	Jewish affairs			
NADA	1923–1979	INTAF	INTAF	Annually	
Ndege	?–1969	RhAF affairs	Rhodesian Air Force		
New Rhodesia	1938–54	Contemporary affairs			
The New Safari		Contemporary affairs		Monthly	
Opus		Student magazine	University of Rhodesia students		
Parade	?–2003	Contemporary affairs		Monthly	
The Police Review (later Outpost)	1911–1970s	BSAP affairs	British South Africa Police	Monthly	
Prize		Contemporary affairs			
Radio Post				Monthly	
Rafters	1941–55		Rhodesian Air Force	Monthly	
Rhodesia Calls		Tourism	Rhodesia National Tourist Board	Bimonthly	
Rhodesia Church Magazine		Anglicanism	Church of the Province of Central Africa		
Rhodesia Railway Review	1911–?80				
Rhodesian Beekeeping	1960–?	Beekeeping	Rhodesian Beekeepers' Association		
Rhodesian and Central African Annual	1950s–60s				
Rhodesian Defence Force Journal	1915–?	Military	Rhodesian Security Forces		
Rhodesian Farmer	1942–2002	Agriculture	Rhodesian National Farmers' Union	Weekly	
Rhodesian Poetry	1952–80	Poetry			
Two Tone	1954–81	Poetry	National Arts Foundation of Rhodesia	Quarterly	
