= Ilunga Tshibinda =

Ilunga Tshibinda was a Mwata Gaand of Luba descent. He was the second son of Ilunga Mbidi and younger brother Kalala Ilunga.

At the seizure of power by Kalala Ilunga, Ilunga Tshibinda decided to leave his brother's empire is too small "for both. Arriving on land Lunda there marry Queen Lueji A'Nkonde. No longer in the opportunity to prevail, Lueji cèda the throne to her husband, who rebelled brothers Lueji. Became sole master of the Kingdom, Ilunga Tshibinda led a campaign of expansion in which there will be great successes at the point of raising the Lunda kingdom to an empire, competing with his brother Kalala Ilunga.

It is proclaimed Emperor and took the title of Mukalenge. Its capital was Asokwele. Ilunga Tshibinda had several children, among them the best known were Mwata Mutomb Kumuinda and Kasongo. Mwata Mutomb succèda his father and was known as Mwata Yav (or Mwant-a-Yav) Mutomb. The kings Lunda bear the title of Mwata Yav after him.
