= Tshibinda Ilunga =

- Ruler of the Lunda
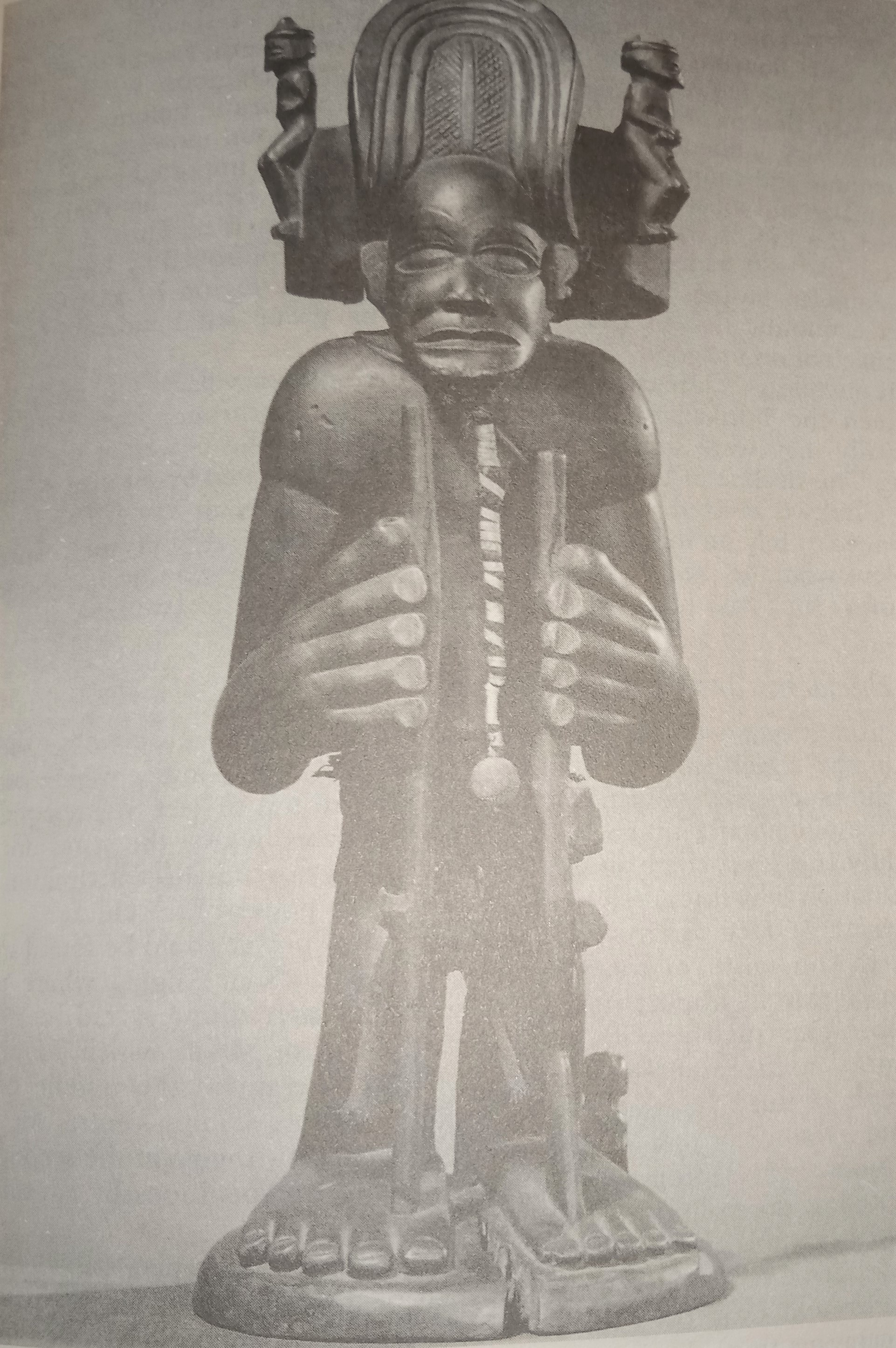
- Reign: c. 1600
- Coronation: c. 1600
- Predecessor: Yala Mwaku
- Successor: Yav Ilunga
- Born: Luba
- Spouse: Lueji A'Nkonde
- House: Lunda Kingdom
- Father: Ilunga Mbili
- Mother: Bulanda

Tshibinda Ilunga or Chibinda Yirung (c. 1600) was a Luba and founder of the Lunda Kingdom that covered large parts of modern Democratic Republic of the Congo and Angola.

Oral history has him as a noble of the Luba people's who in the early 17th century married the daughter of the Lunda King. Tshibinda Ilunga introduces the more advanced Luba hunting technologies and ideas of government this allowed the Lunda to expand into a great kingdom.

== Origins ==
Ilunga was the son or grandson of Ilunga Mbili the founder of the Luba Kingdom. Mbili came from East of the Lualaba river and became general of King Kongolo’s army and also helped him establish the Luba Kingdom. Tshibinda Ilunga was his son as well as King Kongolo’s maternal nephew; his older brother was Kalala Ilunga.

After Ilunga Mbili left the Luba Kingdom and went back to his homeland, he left his two sons to be raised by the prophet Mujibu in the royal court. Tshibinda Ilunga’s mother was Bulanda, and her sister Mabela was Kalala Ilunga’s mother; both women were King Kongolo’s sisters and wives to Ilunga Mbili.

== Rise ==
Growing up, Kongolo’s nephews show great hunting and war skills as well as exceptional mystical abilities like their father. Tshibinda excels as a hunter and Kalala as a warrior; both help Kongolo extend the kingdom, and Kalala who heads the army establishes an empire. The fame of both Princes overshadows that of King Kongolo who becomes jealous of his nephews, and plots to have them murdered. While Kalala and his troops are sent on an expedition, on the orders of the King there’s a mutiny and a group of soldiers attempt to kill Kalala. Most remain faithful to Kalala; he therefore comes out victorious. After seeing Kalala alive, Kongolo becomes fearful of his nephews’ growing power and influence. He organizes a ceremony in which the Princes had to dance in front of the King as were the customs. A hole filled with spears and idols was dug in the lane on which Kalala had to dance. It is said that Kalala was warned by the spirits through the drum beats and so Kalala was able to safely complete the dance avoiding the hole. King Kongolo becomes furious and orders the death of both Princes. Kalala Ilunga and Tshibinda Ilunga run away after their mothers had given them their father’s princely attributes. They leave the Kingdom in search of their father. Upon finding him, Ilunga Mbili recognizes them by their attributes and welcomes them. He then puts them in charge of his army and sends them back to the Luba Kingdom. King Kongolo flees to the caves after being overthrown; the brothers chase him and kill him. Kalala beheads him and cuts off his genitalia which he shows to the people as proof of his victory. Kalala Ilunga is then proclaimed Emperor “Mulopwe” in Tshiluba. Kalala Ilunga firmly establishes the Luba Empire.

After the crowning of Kalala, Tshibinda Ilunga separates from his brother and at the head of an army, he leaves pursuing other lands westward.

== Rulership of the Lunda ==
The Lunda were a group of people living southwest of the Luba. Their ruler was Yala Mwaku. He had two sons, Kinguri and Kinyama and a daughter Lueji A'Nkonde. The ruler quarrels with his sons, and gives his bracelet of power (the “rukan”) to his daughter. Her brothers became furious and exiled themselves from the Kingdom. Kinguri becomes ruler of the Kasanje Kingdom while Kinyama becomes ruler of the Luvale people.

Lueji marries the foreign prince Ilunga. Tshibinda Ilunga introduces the Luba rituals, culture and religion which the Lunda adopt. Lueji rules by handling law and order while Tshibinda leads his army and conquers the surrounding people including those of Lueji’s brothers the Chokwe, and establishes the Lunda Empire.

Due to Lueji’s abnormal dysmenorrhea, she was too sick to rule hence gave the “rukan” to Tshibinda. Tshibinda Ilunga is proclaimed Emperor and takes the title of Mukalenge; he introduces the Luba’s principle of sacred kingship and rule by council; his mystical powers gave him the status of a God-King and identified him as a Solar deity.

Under Tshibinda Ilunga, the Lunda Empire rivals that of his brother even greatly surpassing it. The Empire extends from the east of Angola to the southeast Democratic Republic of Congo neighbouring the Luba Empire and all the way south of Zambia.

== Death and Decline ==
Tshibinda Ilunga was known as a hunter, warrior, prophet and civilizing hero. Unable to have children herself, Lueji consents to Ilunga taking a second wife. This produces an heir named Yav Ilunga. At his death his son succeeds him and becomes the first Mwata Yamvo and extends the Empire further. Today in the Democratic Republic of Congo, the Lunda Kingdom is still ruled by a Mwata Yamvo.

The descendant of Tshibinda Ilunga migrated north to the current Kasai-Oriental province in the Democratic Republic of Congo and founded the Kingdom of the Bakwa Dishi.

The Chokwe are known for their artistic wood carvings of Tshibinda Ilunga. He is usually portrayed with an extravagant hair style depicting his royal statues, a medicine horn as a symbol of his mystical knowledge and a staff which shows his rulership.
