= Bakwa Dishi tribe =

The Bakwa Dishi is a people belonging to the Luba ethnic group living today in the Kasai-Oriental Province in the Democratic Republic of Congo. Miabi, the Dishi Capital, is located 16 miles (26 km) West of Mbuji-Mayi. The territory of the Bakwa Dishi lies on approximately 1,900 square miles (4,900 km^{2}), which is known as the Miabi territory.

They speak Tshiluba in spite of their history with the Lunda Empire, and their dialect is considered the oldest and purest among the Luba-Kasai.

== Origins ==
In the 17th century, the Luba Prince Tshibinda Ilunga son of Ilunga Mbili leaves the Luba Empire ruled by his brother Kalala Ilunga and marries Queen Naweej of the Lunda. He brings with him the Luba customs (such as the Luba style of ceremonial chieftainship) and culture and religion introduced by his father; and enlarges the Kingdom to become an Empire rivaling his brother, even greatly surpassing him. He extends the empire to the south of current Zambia, east of Angola and south west of the Democratic Republic of Congo. Tshibinda Ilunga is crowned Emperor and is praised as a "God-King" or "Anointed One" and civilizing hero.

His son Mwata Mutomb succeeds him and becomes the first Mwata Yamvo. Though his father was praised as a civilizing hero; Mwata Mutomb's authority is disputed by the Lunda who consider him and his family as foreigners. Because of numerous civil wars, he and the rest of the Imperial family are forced to capitulate and thus cut all ties with the Lunda people and begin a migration which Mwata Mutomb leads. At the death of Queen Naweej, it is one of her brother's son who is crowned; he assumes the style and title of Mwata Yamvo which all future Lunda rulers will assumes.

== Founding ==
At the death of Mwata Mutomb, his son Mbuyi Tshitenge succeeded him, then Kamanga Matunlungu, then finally Kafwembe succeeded him in place of his father Mwanza Mukala. At his inauguration Kafwemb chose to carry the title of MBAYI which means prince or Lord in Chilunda. Mbayi Kafwemb leads the migration westward and finally settles down around a salted lake named Dishi which is now drained. The descendant of Tshibinda Ilunga took the name of the lake and today they still carry the name of the Bakwa Dishi. It was at the end of the 17th century that Mbayi Kafwemb firmly established the Kingdom of the Bakwa Dishi and was prosperous in the business of salt.

== Kingship ==
The power is transmitted by blood in the Luba culture, but with the Bakwa Dishi in particular, it is transmitted two ways. First by blood, then inside the bloodline, it can be transmitted by wealth. In other words, if one is not a member of the Royal Family he will never be able to rule; but if he is of the Royal Family but is not wealthy he will not be able to rule either. When the King dies, it is either one of his brothers, sons or nephews that can replace him. There is no pre-determined order. It is only their moral and mystical aptitudes as well material capabilities that will determine which one will be chosen by the King as his heir. In the event that the King dies without designating his successor, it is those same aptitudes and conditions that will be taken into account by the members of the Royal Family to designate the heir to the throne.

By moral aptitude, it is understood that the life of a King must be an example. He must be good, just, courageous, and especially showcase a sense of leadership. By mystical aptitude, it is understood that the King has been initiated to different degrees of traditional knowledge. Finally, by material capabilities, it means that the King must have enough riches to take care of his subjects.

== Today ==
The Bakwa Dishi realm is composed of 23 different clans. Each clan is headed by a Chief. Here is the list of the different Bakwa Dishi clans:

- Mbayi
- Muyombo
- Nyandu
- Mbuyi
- Tshimuna
- Kayombo
- Tshimungu
- Kalonji
- Mpemba
- Ndumbi
- Kasansa
- Lukanda
- Kanda
- Kaye
- Mbadi
- Tshiala
- Mushingala
- Mbiya
- Mulenga
- Ntembwe
- Nsumba
- Mbwanga
- Lubashi

The ruling clan of the Bakwa Dishi is that of the Bena Mbayi (sons of Mbayi), which is led by the royal family under André-Philippe Futa. After the death of the Kazadi Diofua, the last King of the Bakwa Dishi; Futa who was the chosen heir was to young to rule. His father and uncles assumed the regency while he continued his studies which eventually took him overseas.

After many years out of the D. R. Congo, Andre-Philippe Futa was called by President Joseph Kabila of the Democratic Republic of Congo, hence came back and served in the government and eventually became Minister of Finance. During election 2006, he led the multi-party Alliance of the Presidential Majority (French: Alliance pour la majorité présidentielle, AMP) as Coordinator and helped Kabila win the election. He was elected Senator of Kasai Oriental in 2007.

Andre-Philippe Futa Mudiumbula Tshitumbu is planned to be recognized as the traditional ruler and crowned King and grand chief of the Bakwa Dishi and Miabi.

Family tree of the Bakwa Dishi Royal Family:

1585 Foundation of the Luba Empire with Ilunga Mbili

1600s Tshibinda Ilunga (Luba Prince and Emperor of the Lunda and brother to Kalala Ilunga Emperor of the Luba)
1600s Mwata Mutomb (Emperor of the Lunda was the first Mwata Yamvo)
1600s Mbuyi Tshitenge
1600s Kamanga Matunlungu
1600s Mwanza Mukala

Foundation of the Kingdom of the Bakwa Dishi

1600s Mbayi Kafwemb (King of the Bakwa Dishi)
1700s Mulumba Mungedi (Grand Chief of the Bena Mbayi)
1700s Kalonji (Grand Chief of the Bena Mbayi)
1700s Diala
1700s Kalonji Bambakani (Chief of the Bena Mbayi)
1800s Nsenda Kalubi
1800s Tshipadi Tshikoni (Grand Chief of the Bena Mbayi)
1800s Tshipadi Mfuta (Chief of the Bena Mbayi)
1860s Muka Muyombu (Chief of the Bena Mbayi)
1880s Nyoka Mule wa Muka (Chief of the Bena Mbayi)
1910 Kabongo Mwabilayi (Chief of the Bena Mbayi and regent of the throne of the Bakwa Dishi and brother to Kazadi Diofua King of the Bakwa Dishi)
1943 Mbayi Futa Mudiumbula Tshitumbu André-Philippe (Soon to be crowned King of the Bakwa Dishi and Miabi)

Grand Princes of the Bakwa Dishi

1969 Kabongo Mwabilayi Jean-Philippe
1971 Mbuyamba Kalambayi Jean-Juin
1973 Mulumba Mungedi Bashadila Jean-Leon
1976 Kazadi Diofua Jean-Jacques
1980 Mbombo Kalanga Jean-Joseph
1982 Babaka Kankolongo André-Marie
1993 Mvidié Ntambwe Jean-Laurent

Princesses of the Bakwa Dishi

1968 Ntumba Bilema Melanie
1987 Mpunga Carole
1990 Odia Tshiamboya Marie-Madeleine
