= Colin Style =

British-Zimbabwean poet and writer

- Born: Colin Thomas Elliot Style; 19 September 1933; Salisbury, Southern Rhodesia
- Died: 22 September 2014; Devon, United Kingdom
- Education: Prince Edward School; Rhodes University
- Occupation: Writer
- Known for: Poetry
- Awards: Ingrid Jonker Prize

Colin Style (19 September 1933 – 22 September 2014) was a British-Zimbabwean poet and writer. He was awarded the Ingrid Jonker Prize for best published collection in English in Southern Africa, 1977 with Baobab Street (1977).

== Biography ==
He was raised in Salisbury, Southern Rhodesia (now Harare, Zimbabwe) where he attended Prince Edward School. He read English Literature and History at Rhodes University in Grahamstown, South Africa where he won the Rhodes University Poetry Prize.

He published two volumes of poetry, Baobab Street (1977) and Musical Saw (1981). His poetry also appeared in several anthologies, including Poetry in Rhodesia: 75 Years; A World of Their Own: Southern African Poets of the Seventies; A Century of South African Poetry; A New Book of South African Poetry; Out of the African Ark; Poetry South East 6; and The Oxford Book of Animal Poems. Together with his wife, O-lan, he started Chirimo, a thrice-yearly poetry periodical between 1968 and 1970 subtitled "an international review of Rhodesian and International Poetry." The project was not sustainable long-term as few international poets and scholars chose to identify with the cultural productions of a pariah state, as Rhodesia had become known. In 1986, Style and his wife edited the Mambo Book of Zimbabwean Poetry in English, which remains the fullest record of Zimbabwean poetry to date.

His poems also appeared in Country Life, Christian Science Monitor, Chicago Review, The Cornhill Magazine, The Sewanee Review, Ariel as well as Rhodesian Poetry (later Zimbabwean Poetry). He also contributed articles and literary criticism to a number of publications, including The London Magazine, Country Life, This England, Encounter, The Daily Telegraph, Financial Times, The Salisbury Review, The Lady Partisan Review and the scholarly journal, English in Africa. He also worked with the BBC on a number of projects including reviewing books for the BBC World Service. He also produced and presented programmes for BBC Radio, including Dream of Ophir, and I Haunt the Sunny Streets, a selection of Zimbabwean Poetry.

=== Works ===
- Baobab Street (Johannesburg: Bateleur Press, 1977)
- Musical Saw (Harare: Mopani Series, 1981)

== Personal life ==
He married the writer O-lan Style and they had a daughter together, Kelda. The family relocated to Kent, England in 1977 before settling permanently in Devon in 1988. He died unexpectedly of a heart attack in 2014.
