= Ingombe Ilede =

Archaeological site in Zambia

- location in Zambia
- 16°9′36″S 28°48′15″E
- Location: Southern Province
- Region: Zambia

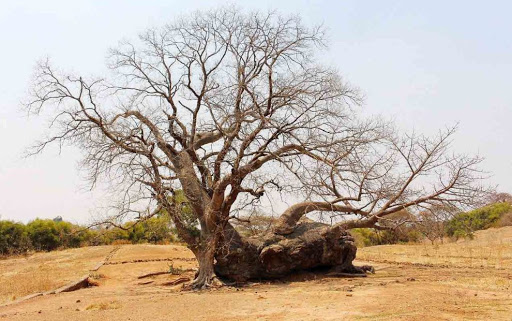
Fig. 1. The Baobab trees named after the site. Artists: Edwin Smith and Andrew Dale.

Ng'ombe Ilede is an archaeological site located on a hill near the confluence of the Zambezi and Lusitu rivers, near the town of Siavonga, in Zambia. Ing'ombe Ilede, meaning "a sleeping cow", received its name from a local baobab tree that is partially lying on the ground and resembles a sleeping cow from a distance. The site is thought to have been a major commercial site around the 16th century whose chief item of trade was salt. Ng'ombe Ilede received various goods from the hinterland of south-central Africa, such as, copper, slaves, gold and ivory. These items were exchanged with glass beads, cloth, cowrie shells from the Indian Ocean trade. The status of Ing'ombe Ilede as a trading center that connected different places in south-central Africa has made it a very important archaeological site in the region.

== Excavation ==
The site was uncovered in 1960 by Northern Rhodesia government workers and excavated by the archaeologist J.H Chaplin, an inspector for the Northern Rhodesia Commission for Preservation of National and Historical Monuments and Relics. Chaplin carried out an investigation of the pit, located on the western side of the site. The pit contained archaeological items such as copper bangles, copper crosses, copper currency rods and a gold beaded necklace. This area was later named burial 1. The second discovery at the site consisted of burial 2 and 3 on the south end of the site, excavated by J.H. Chaplin and B. W. Anderson around the tank area. The burial contained iron tools that lay at the feet of the human remains. The government extended the tank area a bit further, and the extension yielded two more human remains. Further excavations were in 1962 when the Water Department decided to include another water tank on the western side of the original tank to maximize the water supply in the area around Ing'ombe Ilede. This extension led to the discovery of 30 human remains which included 22 infants. These graves contained very few goods. The pottery found in association with the graves was linked to the earlier graves found at Ing'ombe Ilede.

== Burials ==
There were 48 + burial graves that were uncovered at Ing'ombe Ilede between the periods 1960-1962 by Chaplin and Mrs Anderson. These graves contained various grave goods. The goods ranged from ornamented objects such as glass beads, copper bangles to ceremonial goods such as the gongs and hoes, which were symbols of chieftainship and utilitarian items such as tongs, wire drawing plates, hammerheads and copper razors. These burials were found in two locations at the site, the central tank area that contained 14 burials, while the 34 graves were located on the south edge of Ing'ombe Ilede.

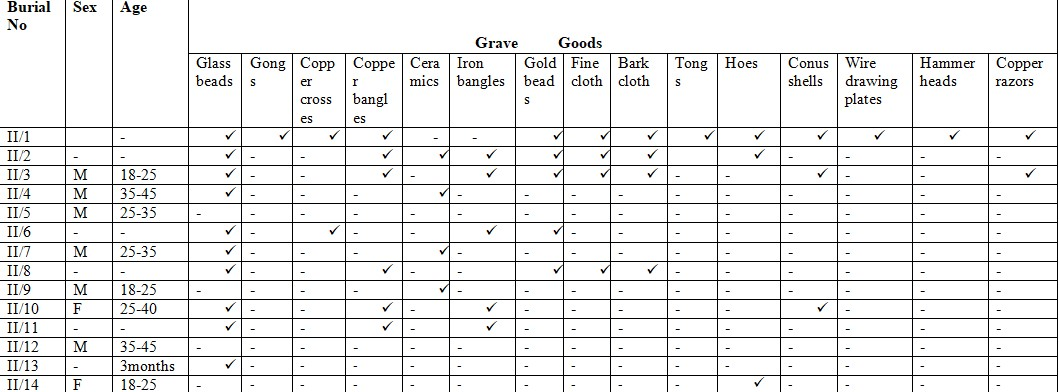
Table 1. Showing grave goods from the Central Tank area at Ing'ombe Ilede. By Brian Fagan et al. 1969.

== Dating ==
The earliest attempts at dating Ing'ombe Ilede placed the occupation of the site from the 7th-11th centuries. These dates came from charcoal samples obtained from a badly disturbed context excavated by Chaplin in 1960. Phillipson and Fagan reported and revised these dates after their trial excavation in 1968 near the earlier excavated rich burials, which produced additional charcoal for radiocarbon dating. The newly obtained dates suggested a domestic occupation near the burials in the 14th-15th centuries, and Phillipson and Fagan argued that this might have been a second, potentially shorter occupation of the site. They concluded that their new dates did not preclude the possibility of an earlier occupation in the later first millennium CE, followed by abandonment and then reoccupation in the 14th century. However, recent examination of the site using cloth that was obtained from burials 3 and 8 has situated them from the mid-15 to mid-17 centuries, with the most likely dates being in the 16th century. When these results are considered together with material culture comparisons to other sites in the region, McIntosh and Fagan conclude that there is strong evidence that the occupations involving major social differentiation and long-distance trade at Ing'ombe Ilede are not earlier than the late 15th century, suggesting future research should focus on Ing'ombe Ilede's role in 16th century networks.

== Social Stratification ==
The social status of the people of Ing'ombe llede was determined based on the contents of the burials. The burial sites with ornaments were probably for the affluent people, such as traders, yes whilst the graves without ornaments probably belonged to slaves or the less affluent. For example, some burials containing metal crafting tools such as those used for drawing and hammering copper wire were connected to metal craftsmen, who were considered of high social status.There was also evidence of hierarchy at Ing'ombe Ilede; for instance, burial 8 contained a flanged iron gong, a traditional symbol of chieftainship that resembled those found among people of Congo DR ancestry.

== Trade ==
Ing'ombe Iledes' central location gave it the best position as a transit point for the inland trade routes from Great Zimbabwe, Copperbelt and Katanga to the Indian Ocean coast. Items of trade brought to the inland from the Indian Ocean included: glass beads, shell beads, cowrie shells and cloth, while items that came from the Indian Ocean trade route included; ivory, slaves, salt and gold. This central position also created a similar advantage for traders coming from Katanga and Copperbelt who were trading in copper in the form of copper ingots with Ingo'mbe Ilede. Ingo'mbe Ilede become a focal point where traders from various places in south-central Africa came to exchange items. For instance, it facilitated the transaction in copper from Katanga in Congo DR., Copperbelt in Zambia and Hurungwe in Zimbabwe.

== Trade Goods ==
=== Glass beads ===
Trading in glass beads in south-central Africa has a long antiquity that goes back to as early as the 8th to 17th centuries; however, the glass beads only arrived at Ing'ombe Ilede around the mid-15th and mid-17th centuries. Chemical analysis done on the Ing'ombe Ilede beads using laser ablation inductively coupled plasma mass spectrometry shows that the glass beads at Ing'ombe Ilede belong to the Khami series from the Indian Ocean trade zone and possibly found themselves at Ing'ombe Ilede through trade. The beads found at Ing'ombe Ilede have been differentiated from other beads found in south-central Africa like Mapungubwe using trace elements found in the beads. Khami beads, for example, contained high levels of Magnesium oxide . The chemical analysis has helped situate some previously undated burials at In'gombe Ilede. The following are some of the burials that contained the Khami series beads: 3,8,10,25 and 31.

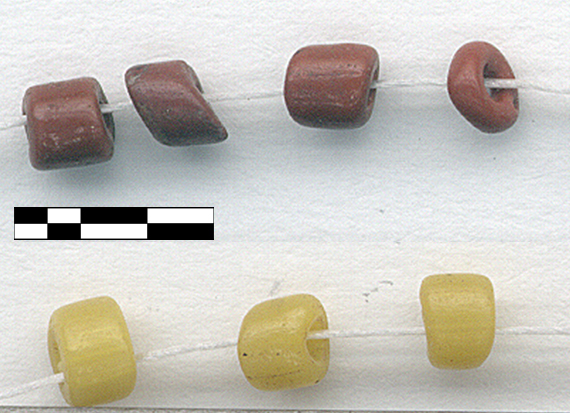
Fig. 2. Glass beads from the archaeological site of Ingombe Ilede in Zambia. The beads are from Grave 3. Photographed by Marilee Wood.

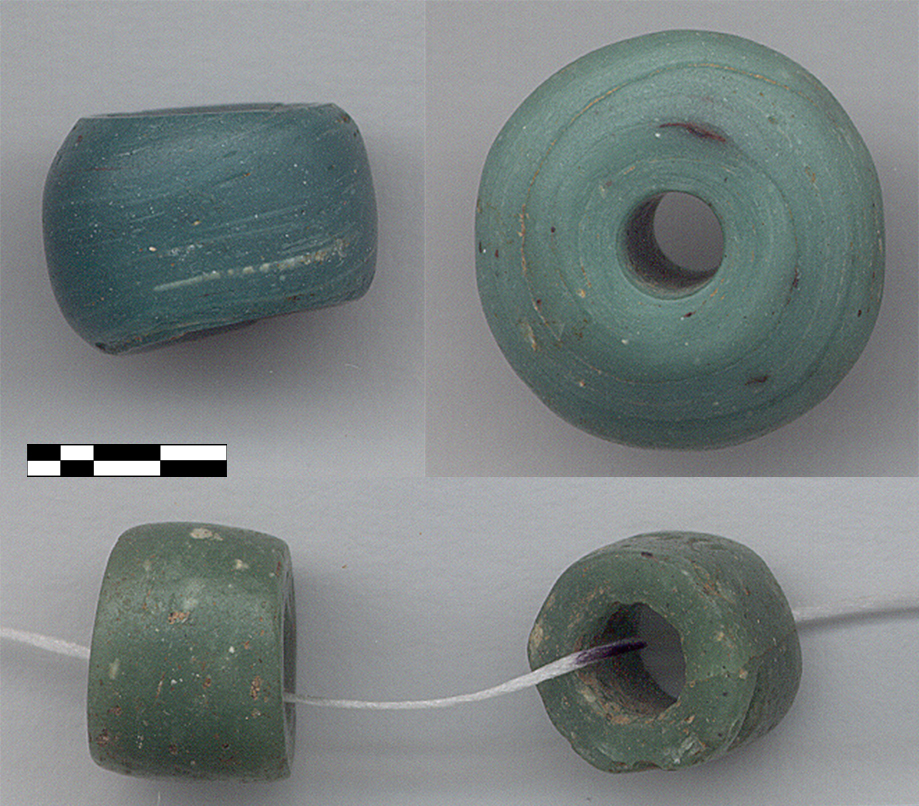
Fig. 3. Glass beads from the archaeological site of Ing'ombe Ilede in Zambia. Beads are from Grave 10 (top) and Grave 4 (bottom). Photographed by Marilee Wood.

Some burials at Ing'ombe Ilede contained beads that were connected to northwestern Zimbabwe chemically, like burials: 1,2,4 and 10. These contained the trace element plant ash (v-Na-Al). These beads had an early date of 14th century. Other sites that situate Ing'ombe Ilede chronologically are:Mankhamba in Malawi dating to the mid-16th and early 17th and Hlamba Mlonga in east Zimbabwe, dating from the 10th to the 15th century. Another site that situates Ing'ombe Ilede chronologically is Isamu Pati, located 300 km (190 mi) from the Ing'ombe Ilede site. The site contained the Khami beads series which are dated to about the 13th to 14th centuries. These dates obtained from the different types of beads found at different sites in south- central Africa shows the long history of trade in glass beads in this part of Africa which spanned from the 10th to 17th centuries.

=== Copper Ingots ===
Copper Ingots were used as a medium of exchange as early has 1000CE in south- central Africa. The ingots at Ing'ombe Ilede came from various places through the inland trade routes and these were shaped in form of crosses. The copper ingots were differentiated using their shape. The shape of the copper ingots has also been a good indicator of chronology for Ing'ombe Ilede. For example, the copper ingots from the Copperbelt were similar in shape with those that came from Katanga; both were flanged and have been dated to the 14th century. On the other hand, the copper ingots from Hurungwe were dated to the 16th century. These copper ingots shared a similar shape with those from the Copperbelt and Katanga area, which shows that trade in copper among these inland sites continued from the 14th century up to the 16th century. Great Zimbabwe had a different form of the copper ingots - unflendged and they were dated to a much earlier date of the 13th century. Despite copper being the primary trade item in south-central trade, the people at Ing'ombe Ilede used copper to manufacture domestic ornaments, such as, the copper bracelets, found in most of the rich burials at the site. The manufacture of copper bracelets is evident in wire drawing tools and a bundle of fine wire for making copper bracelets discovered in some of the rich burials at Ing'ombe Ilede.

=== Textiles ===
The cloth at Ing'ombe Ilede consists of two types: the locally made, coarse cloth, and the finely woven imported cloth, thought to be of Indian origin. The coarse material contained some patterns neatly woven into the fabric. Spindle whorls made from broken pieces of pottery and perforated with a sharp metal object were discovered at the site to support the local production of the coarse cloth.

== Ceramics ==
Ceramics have been a good source of chronology for most of archaeological sites excavated in Africa and the world over. Traits such decorative motifs and vessels shapes have been used to situate ceramics to specific time periods. The shape of the ceramics has also been used to indicate the function of the vessels. Ingombe Ilede contained a large number of ceramics sherds that were reconstructed into complete vessels of various sizes and shapes. These vessels were probably used for domestic purposes or as trade items. There was no evidence of the method used to manufacture pottery at the site. However, archaeologists found tools suggesting pottery production such as pebble tools used for burnishing the surfaces of the vessels before firing them. Also present at the site were mussels used for smoothing the walls of the pottery during the shaping stage. The clay for the pottery was probably obtained from the Lusitu River. The potters perhaps burnt the pottery in an open area owing to uneven coloring found on the surfaces of pottery. The pottery at Ing'ombe Ilede played an essential role in situating the chronology of burials at the site. The chronology of the pottery was done using decorative motifs and the shape of the vessels. These attributed acted as time markers that helped researchers to situate Ing'ombe Ilede Chronologically. For example, the ceramics from earliest levels at Ing'ombe were linked to Kangila and Sebanzi cultures.

== Farming ==
There were several lines of evidence that were discovered at Ingombe Ilede to suggest farming. One of the lines of evidence were domesticated charred sorghum and millet that were found at the site . Also found at the site was indirect evidence, such as a leaf impression of sorghum on a pot sherd from burial 3.Besides, some graves contained iron hoes and axes that pointed to farming. These were differentiated into functional tool and ceremonial tools based on the amount of wear on the surfaces. The hoes and axes used for farming were heavily worn out compared to the ceremonial tools.

== Faunal Remains ==
There was minimal evidence present at the site to indicate the domestication of animals. Among the minimal evidence found at the site were a fragmented ox mandible with maxilla and horns. The rest of the faunal materials belonged to wild animals, ranging from small mammals like rats to big mammals like elephants, with the latter being hunted for ivory and meat.

== See also ==
- History of Zambia
