= Heidi Holland =

South African journalist and author

- Born: 6 October 1947; Johannesburg, South Africa
- Died: 11 August 2012 (aged 64); Johannesburg, South Africa
- Other name: Heidi Hull
- Occupations: Journalist, author
- Notable credit(s): Author of Dinner with Mugabe; Author of The Colour of Murder Freelance writer for The Sunday Times, The Telegraph, International Herald Tribune, The New York Times and The Guardian
- Spouses: Tony Hull; George Patrikios
- Children: 2

Heidi Holland (6 October 1947 – 11 August 2012), also known as Heidi Hull (during her first marriage), was a South African journalist and author who had been involved in the journalism industry for over 30 years. She edited Illustrated Life Rhodesia, worked as a freelance writer on publications such as The Sunday Times, The Telegraph, International Herald Tribune, The New York Times and The Guardian, and had also worked on research projects for British television documentaries.

== Writing ==
She was the author of various books, such as Dinner with Mugabe, an account of her meetings with Robert Mugabe, President (and former Prime Minister) of Zimbabwe. Previously, she released The Colour of Murder, a critical analysis of the 2002 van Schoor murder trials in South Africa. She also released a book based on the history of South Africa's ruling party, The Struggle: A History of the African National Congress.

== Personal life ==
Heidi Holland was born in Johannesburg in 1947, the daughter of a British father and a Swiss mother. When she was three, the family moved to Southern Rhodesia, where she attended Lord Malvern High School in Salisbury, before becoming a journalist, working for Illustrated Life Rhodesia. Holland returned to South Africa in 1982. Her first husband was Tony Hull, with whom she had a son, Jonah, a roving correspondent based in the London broadcast centre of Al Jazeera International. She had a son, called Nick, with her second husband, George Patrikios, a surgeon.

On 11 August 2012, she was found hanging from a tree at her house in Johannesburg. Her second husband predeceased her.

== Journalism ==
Earlier in her career, Holland edited Illustrated Life Rhodesia. Later, as well as freelancing for a number of international titles, she was a columnist for The Star, a South African broadsheet newspaper based in Johannesburg.

== Books ==
=== Dinner with Mugabe ===
The title Dinner with Mugabe relates to an encounter between Holland and Robert Mugabe in 1975 when a friend brought him to her house for a secret dinner as he was about to leave the country to fight the white minority government of Rhodesia during the Bush War. Yet Holland was significant as a white journalist to have secured a 2½-hour interview with Mugabe as Zimbabwean president in December 2007. It took 18 months to secure the interview. In the book, Holland explores the transformation of the man she met in 1975 with his present state. She also looks at his relationships with those such as his first wife, Sally; Lord Soames, the last British Governor; Denis Norman, a white farmer who held several portfolios in his early governments as well as with Ian Smith, the last Prime Minister of Rhodesia. She also questions the President on controversial issues such as Gukurahundi and land reform in Zimbabwe. Several excerpts of the book have appeared in the international press and it is published by Penguin South Africa.

=== The Colour of Murder ===
In 2006, Holland released a South Africa-based true crime investigation of racism and violence in The Colour of Murder: One Family's Horror Exposes a Nation's Anguish. In the book, she explores the controversial family dynamics and racial politics of the white South African Van Schoor family. She focuses on the patriarch Louis van Schoor, a former East London security guard who is alleged to have shot over a hundred black people during apartheid. There is also his daughter, Sabrina van Schoor, who made friends in the coloured community as a child (to her parents' disapproval) and later gave birth to a coloured child, Tatum. In 2001, she ordered a hitman to kill her mother, Beverley, on the grounds that she was a racist. Holland won many awards for this book.

=== African Magic ===
In 2001, Penguin published Africa Magic: Traditional Ideas That Heal a Continent. The book is an exploration of Sub Saharan Africa's natural philosophies looking at ways healers have used traditional belief systems to deal with things such as medical and marital issues.

=== Born in Soweto ===
In 1994, Penguin published Born in Soweto: Inside the Heart of South Africa. The book is a description of life told by Soweto's residents. It is also illustrated.

=== The Struggle ===
The Struggle: A History of the African National Congress was released by the George Braziller publishing company in April 1990. Holland explores the peaceful and violent protestations of the political party against racial discrimination. She also looks at the communist ties of the party as well as the roots of apartheid ideology. The book received favourable reviews, with The New York Times citing it as a 'concise' and 'informative' history of the political party.

== Controversy ==
In May 2009, Holland was embroiled in a row with the leader of South Africa's largest opposition party, the Democratic Alliance. Holland criticized comments made by Helen Zille about the president, Jacob Zuma, in the article "A disservice to white citizens", published by The Star on 21 May 2009.

Holland said that Zille's possibly prejudiced criticism of Zuma, for allegedly endangering his wives by repeatedly having sex with an HIV-positive woman, had reflected badly on the white South African community. On 27 May 2009, the newspaper published Zille's reply. Zille accused Holland of a "warped logic" concerning race issues.
