= Rhodesian Selection Trust =

Mining business

The Rhodesian Selection Trust (RST) was a mining Corporation which produced copper from the Copperbelt region of Northern Rhodesia, now Zambia.

== History ==
The RST was formed in 1928 by Alfred Chester Beatty, an Irish-American mining magnate, as a holding company for his mining assets in Northern Rhodesia. The new company received the financial backing of the American Metal Company of New York, who acquired 1,000,000 shares of RST in October 1930.

In 1960, RST and its main subsidiaries cleared $13,132,546, or 29 cents a share for the fiscal year ending June 30, 1960, an increase from $8,780,651 in the preceding year. In 1964, the firm reported a slight dip in profit from $16,691,000 in 1963 to $16,517,000 for the year ended June 30, 1964. The firms sales however, rose from $142,605,518 to $165,736,718.

=== Zambia independence ===
In February 1964, firm Chairman Sir Ronald Prain, who had insisted RST offer copper outside the speculative London Metal Exchange at a price below the exchange level, argued alongside the Anglo-American Corporation of South Africa "for maintaining copper price stability". On October 23, 1964, in a letter to stockholders, Chairman Prain noted that the date marked the first day of independence of the Republic of Zambia, previously Northern Rhodesia. "He said that Zambia has a larger white population than any other country in tropical Africa now under an African Government and added, 'It is gratifying to record that race relations are excellent.'"

In December 1964, the Rhodesian Selection Trust, Ltd. changed its name to Roan Selection Trust, Ltd. At the same time, the Roan Antelope Division of Rhodesian Selection Trust, Ltd., became the Luanshya Division of Roan Selection Trust, Ltd.

=== 1970 merger ===
In 1970, Roan Selection Trust, Ltd., which had been 42.3% owned by American Metal Climax, Inc., became a wholly owned subsidiary of AMAX as a result of a reorganization.

"The amalgamation will be effected under an arrangement before Zambia's high court that will also provide that a substantial portion of the Roan assets be received by other than Amax shareholders. Under the previously announced nationalization of all Zambian copper properties, the present mining, smelting and refining operations of Roan in Zambia are to be merged into a single company to be named Roan Consolidated Mines, Ltd., in which A state‐owned industrial corporation, Indeco, will acquire a 51 per cent equity interest. The remaining 49 per cent of the equity capital in Roan Consolidated will be owned 36.75 percent by Roan Selec tion and the remaining 12.25 per cent almost entirely by companies in the Anglo-American Corporation group by reason of their present minority, interests in certain of the Roan Selection companies."

In 1982, NCCM and RCM were merged into the giant Zambia Consolidated Copper Mines Ltd (ZCCM).

=== 1993 merger ===
In 1993, AMAX merged with the Cyprus Mines Corporation to form Cyprus Amax Minerals Company, the world's leading producer of molybdenum and lithium, and a leading producer of copper and coal. In 1999, Cyprus Amax Minerals was acquired by Phelps Dodge Corporation which in turn was acquired by Freeport-McMoRan (NYSE: FCX) in 2007, forming the world's largest copper producer.
