= Kongolo Mwamba =

Kongolo (or Nkongolo) was a leader of the Luba people in the region of Katanga, and the first king of the Luba Empire. He built his capital in Mwibele, near Lake Boya. Kongolo Mwamba was trying to extend his kingdom by conquering the neighbouring Songye chiefdoms.

He met a prince of the Kunda people on behalf of Ilunga Mbidi through its sisters who had met at the lake; Mbidi, being a late military strategist, helped Kongolo expand his Kingdom. The popularity and the growing power of Mbidi Ilunga overshadowed that of Kongolo, who was advised by his entourage to organize a conspiracy to eliminate Mbidi. With the help of his wives, Ilunga Mbidi absconded by leaving women and children while returning to Kunda.

A son of Ilunga Mbidi and nephew of Kongolo, Kalala Ilunga, took the place of his father as one of the generals among the warring forces. He also became very powerful, which overshadowed Kongolo. Kongolo tried several times to remove his nephew but failed. At the last attempt, Kalala Ilunga decided to end it, and defeated and killed Kongolo after a victory on the battlefield. After severing the head and genitals of Kongolo, he was proclaimed Emperor, or Mulopwe.
