= Graham Publishing Company =

- Status: Active
- Country of origin: Rhodesia
- Headquarters location: Salisbury, Rhodesia
- Publication types: Books, magazines
- Imprints: Illustrated Life Rhodesia

The Graham Publishing Company was a book and magazine publisher that operated in Salisbury, Rhodesia, during, at least, the 1960s, 1970s, and early 1980s.

== Operations ==
The company published a wide range of books aimed largely at the white settler market, as well as a magazine called Illustrated Life Rhodesia which was also targeted at the same market. However, shortly after Rhodesia achieved independence as Zimbabwe in 1980, the company published the autobiography of a black leader, Maurice Nyagumbo, which was described later that year as "probably the most important publishing event in post-independent Zimbabwe".

== See also ==
- Kenya Literature Bureau
- University of Namibia Press
- Vakoka Vakiteny
- WordAlive Publishers
