= Illustrated Life Rhodesia =

Rhodesian news magazine

- Editor: Heidi Hull
- Categories: History, news, tabloid
- Frequency: Fortnightly
- Founded: 1968
- Final issue: 1978
- Company: Graham Publishing Company
- Country: Rhodesia
- Based in: Salisbury

Illustrated Life Rhodesia was a fortnightly picture magazine published in Salisbury, Rhodesia, by the Graham Publishing Company, from at least 1968 to at least 1978. Aimed at the white Rhodesian populace, it carried articles on Rhodesian history as well as on current affairs and prominent local personalities. It was viewed as liberal by some because, under the editorship of Heidi Hull, it was often critical of the Ian Smith government; nevertheless, it published a favourable report on the 'protected villages' scheme introduced by the government.
