= Sylvester Chisembele =

Zambian politician

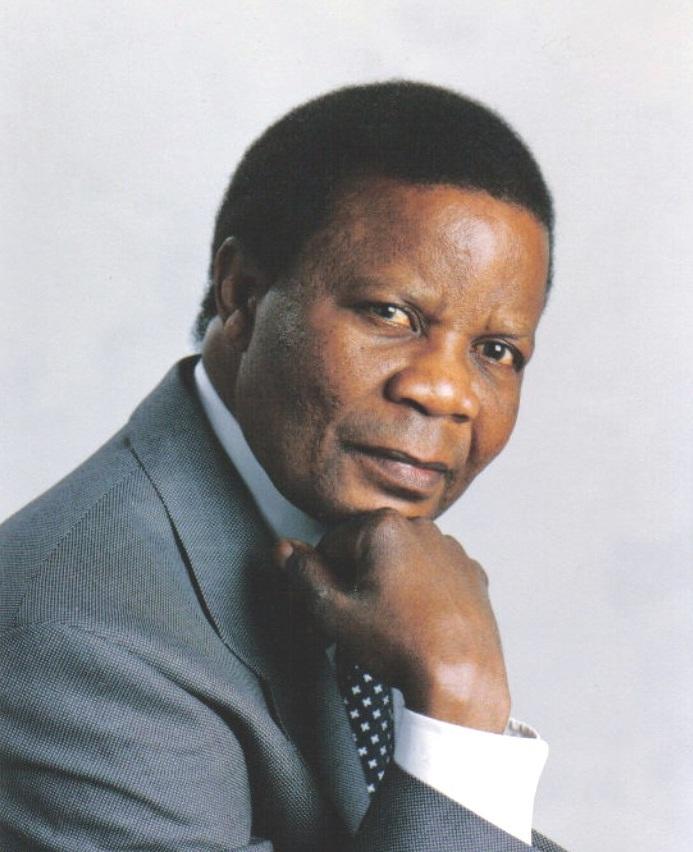
- Cabinet Minister for Western, Eastern and Copperbelt Provinces.

Personal details
- Born: 1 March 1930 Fort Rosebery
- Died: 5 February 2006 (aged 75)
- Party: United National Independence Party
- Spouse: Sophena A Chisembele
- Profession: Businessman

Sylvester Mwamba Chisembele (1 March 1930 – 5 February 2006) was an ex-seminarian and cabinet minister in Zambia's first and second governments.

== Early life ==
Sylvester began his primary education in Fort Rosebery and in 1942 he entered Lubushi Seminary in the Northern Province where he completed Standard VI. His father Michael Filalo Chisembele and uncle Romano Filalo Lupambo had come from Mporokoso via Kawambwa to Fort Rosebery in 1915 and started lay-preaching under the direction of visiting priests attached to the Lubwe Mission. Michael Filalo Chisembele was later sent to Rosa Catechist School where he was formally trained as a lay-preacher and teacher. On his return to Fort Rosebery, they encountered great difficulties with the District Commissioner which were resolved after the intervention of the Lubwe Mission priests and the Bishop at Chilubula, in order for them to start to build the first Roman Catholic churches and schools. Michael Filalo Chisembele and his brother Romano established the first Roman Catholic church in Fort Rosebery in 1920. They also encountered initial problems with the Chiefs which were overcome. Schools were built with mud, sand and wood for the roofs by the people converted to Catholicism in the surrounding areas. This was the strong religious background to Sylvester's early life. In 1948 he was asked to leave the Seminary due to disagreements on racial equality, his views were considered too radical for that period in time.

== Business ==
As a trader of finger millet he made enough money to invest in a restaurant and a bakery. He had also introduced Mikwau Fishing Nets on Lake Bangweulu.

== Activism ==
He joined the African National Congress. By 1955, Mr Chisembele had organised a firm ANC base in Fort Rosebery (Mansa) using his own resources. At Lubwe Mission with the full participation of Mr Sylvester Muchengwa and Mr Protasio Kamayanda, both leading personalities and leaders in the Catholic Church, the ANC spread rapidly.

In 1956 Mr Chisembele along with three of his colleagues, were all sent to prison in Fort Rosebery and Ndola's Bwana Mkubwa prison for 9 months with hard labour.

Chisembele – Visiting Chiefs on Campaign.

Upon their return, Mr Chisembele continued organising the ANC and was elected Provincial General Secretary of Luapula Province in 1957.

In May 1958 there was an assassination attempt on his life. His life was saved by villagers who ran to his rescue, but the incident left him with a shattered eardrum and impaired hearing for the rest of his life

In 1958 Mr Chisembele was called to Lusaka to accompany Mr Harry Mwaanga Nkumbula, leader of African National Congress, on a tour of Luapula Province. The tour was not a success. When there was a split in October 1958, Chisembele formed the Zambia African National Congress (ZANC) party. UNIP was built on the ashes of the ZANC, which the British colonial governor banned.

On 12 March 1959 Mr Chisembele was arrested and detained at Kalabo, in the Barotse Province, now Western Province, for 9 months under the restriction order of Governor Sir Arthur Benson.

In July 1961, Mr Chisembele successfully organised the burning of the colonial identity cards commonly known as "Chitupas" throughout Luapula Province. Mr Chisembele was imprisoned for three months with hard labour in Milima prison in Kasama District.

Between 1956 and 1962 Mr Chisembele was many times imprisoned ranging from one month to three months for addressing meetings without a permit and on some occasions for addressing indoor meetings without a permit, although these meetings were of Party members and did not, by law, require any permit.

== Government ==
After independence, Mr Chisembele served in many portfolios in government in different ministries and at Cabinet Minister level in various provinces.

In 1968 general elections, the ruling party UNIP lost all seats in Barotse Province to opposition ANC. In 1969 Mr Chisembele was transferred from Copperbelt to the Barotse Province as Cabinet Minister. He established an excellent working relationship with the Litunga, Mbikushita Lewanika and enjoyed the support of his KUTA and the Ngambela SUU. By 1970 he not only won back the province to UNIP but also had all the MPs cross the floor to UNIP, a feat that drew him congratulations from all his colleagues including telegrams of congratulations from Hon. Sikota Wina amongst others. Apart from the Copperbelt and Western Province, he served as Cabinet Minister in Eastern Province.

== Constitution process ==
The Constitution for Zambia implemented at the start of Independence was drawn up by the outgoing colonial power, Britain. This Constitution agreed to by the President in waiting, Kenneth David Kaunda, gave him sole power over the affairs of the Nation. No opportunity was given to the Provincial leaders or the UNIP National Council to discuss or debate the merits or failures in this imposed Constitution. As a result, the Constitution was a bone of dissension from the beginning.

Luapula Province in particular was opposed to a system of one-man rule as earlier events at the Magoye Conference in 1962 had shown. Although a Referendum was held in 1969 to amend the Zambia Constitution, this did not touch on the powers held by President Kaunda, the purpose was to amend the Referendum clause to allow proposed amendments to be considered by elected representatives rather than the country at large. The hope that consideration of the Constitution clause touching on Presidential powers would be given was not part of the process. It took years before the effects of the one-man rule system became apparent to a sufficiently large enough faction to bring about attempts to amend the Constitution clause that gave all power to one individual. Chisembele made submissions on the necessity of reducing presidential powers to all the subsequent Constitution Review Commissions but these were either ignored or unheeded.

== Retirement from politics ==
Mr Chisembele retired from active politics in 1983 and concentrated on running his private businesses.

History repeated itself, from 1993 to 1997 both his restaurants were expropriated and his farm destroyed and repossessed by government. In October 2004 it was published in the press and stated in Gazette Notice No. 640 dated 22 October 2004, that he had been awarded the Order of the Eagle of Zambia 4th Division, this was a lie. Mr Chisembele had refused to accept the Award.

== Death ==
Mr Chisembele started suffering ill health in October 2005. His condition had not been fully diagnosed, despite undergoing several tests up to the time of his death, on 5 February 2006.

Mr Chisembele was survived by his wife, Sophena and three daughters, Matilda Bwalya, Mary Chewe and Christina Chishimba.

His wife, Sophena, wrote a book published in 2016 recounting the freedom struggle and the aftermath with particular reference to the history of Sylvester Chisembele
