= Ilunga Mbidi =

Ilunga Mbidi was a soldier and cultural hero of the Luba and Lunda people.

== Origins ==
The details of his origins are not known. It is likely that he came from another Bantu kingdom to the East of the Lualaba river.

== Prophecy ==
Kongolo was a tyrant ruling over indigenous people of the Upemba Depression. Wanting to create a kingdom, he consulted the prophet Mujibu. Mujibu prophesied that he could never rule as he was a commoner; but soon the Bulopwe “sacral royal blood” would arrive. If he welcomed him properly, blessings and prosperity would come with the Bulopwe and Kongolo would establish a kingdom, but if he went against him; his God would take away his ruler ship and he would be put to death.

== The Arrival and founding of the Luba ==
For unknown reasons Ilunga Mbili left his Kingdom which general belief place it to the east of Lake Tanganyika. He came out of a lake where he meets Kongolo’s sisters Mabela and Bulala. Contrary to the natives, he was tall and dark complexioned and had thin features accentuated by his sharp nose. He wore a red feather on his head and by his princely garments, Mabela and Bulala recognized him as nobility so they decided to escort him and his suites to Kongolo.

Kongolo welcomed Ilunga Mbili to his court and eventually put him at the head of his army. Ilunga Mbili was a military strategist, and advised Kongolo on political matters as well; he led wars in all directions and expanded Kongolo’s control of the land to create the Luba Kingdom in 1585. Kongolo gave him his two sisters in marriage and he begat two sons, Kalala Ilunga from Mabela and Tshibinda Ilunga from Bulala.

Ilunga Mbili was a warrior, a hunter and prophet. He was feared and exalted for his mystical abilities; he introduced his God, his religion and culture to the Kingdom. His fame overshadowed that of Kongolo which created many conflicts between the two. Against the advice of the prophet Mujibu, Kongolo plots to have Ilunga Mbili assassinated. Mabela and Bulanda inform him of their brother’s plot. Ilunga Mbili gives each of his wives a red feather and his princely attributes and instructs them to give it to his children when they become men, and they are to find him and show these attributes if they want him to recognize them as his sons.

Ilunga Mbili blessed his children and put them under the protection of the Angel and went back to his Kingdom with his suites. He never came back, it is said that he left as he came, on water. His children grew up under the guidance of the prophet Mujibu, and eventually fulfilled Mujibu’s prophecy by killing their uncle Kongolo.

== Legacy ==
Out of him came two empires, that of the Luba Empire under his son Kalala Ilunga and that of the Lunda Empire under his second son Tshibinda Ilunga. Today he is claimed as an ancestor and civilizing hero by different Kingdoms and Chiefdoms of both Kasai provinces and Katanga province of the Democratic Republic of Congo, eastern Angola and Zambia including such people as the Kazembe, Chokwe, and Bemba people.

His direct descendants through Tshibinda Ilunga are the Bakwa Dishi of Miabi ruled by Mbayi Futa Tshitumbu also known as Andre-Philippe Futa. The Bakwa Dishi left the Lunda Empire in mid 17th century due to civil wars from the Lunda people and settled in the current Kasai-oriental Province of the Democratic Republic of Congo. His direct descendant through Kalala Ilunga are those of the Luba-Kabongo whose present ruler is Kumwimba Kabongo Kansh’imbu and Luba-Kasongo whose last ruler was Kisula Ngoy in 1964; Kalala Ilunga’s lineage split in two in 1889 due to succession disputes.

== See also ==
- Baluba mythology
