= Kalala Ilunga =

- Reign: c. 1600 / c. 1700
- Coronation: c. 1600
- Predecessor: Ilunga Mbili
- Born: Kingdom of Luba
- House: Kingdom of Luba
- Father: Ilunga Mbili aka Mbidi Kiluwe
- Mother: Bulanda

Kalala Ilunga (b. 16th century) was a Prince, King and one of the emperors of Luba Empire, the latter of which spread over the province of Katanga (before cutting) into Zambia and Zimbabwe. A mythic cultural hero who had invented much of Luba culture, Kalala is the first sacred King of the Kingdom of Luba and its most revered son.

Known as "The Warrior" and regarded as the most famous of Luba Kings for having been able to praise himself for his future exploits the same day he was born, Kalala Ilunga was the eldest son of Ilunga Mbili and nephew of King Kongolo Mwamba. From a young age, Kalala is an attractive option by his capacity warrior (like his father), his intelligence, powerful presence as well as his spiritual and mystical gifts.

Kongolo, on the other hand, already old and worried for his offspring and his empire ambitions and fearing revenge against Ilunga Mbili, will organize a plot to eliminate Kalala as well. During a ceremony at the Court, Kalala Ilunga, like all other Princes had to do a ritual dance before the king. In the dance hall had been dug a hole where there had concealed spears and fetishes so that Kalala Ilunga would fall over and die. However, priests Mbudie had echoes of the trap and alerted him. During the ceremony, Kalala Ilunga performed his dance with caution to avoid the trap. After the coup failed, Kongolo held another conspiracy with the complicity of a few soldiers.

It was expected that the slaughter Kalala Ilunga warriors on the battlefield. When the mutiny broke out, the faithful of the protected Kalala Ilunga and came out victorious. Thinking that his victory was gained, Kongolo went on the battlefield to find Kalala Ilunga living and supported by the soldiers. Kalala Ilunga went after Kongolo, caught him and killed him. He took care to take his head and his genitals with whom he returned to the capital of Mwibele. In exposing the people and the court, he was immediately proclaimed King of kings, Mulopwe (Emperor in Tshiluba).
