= Architecture of Africa =

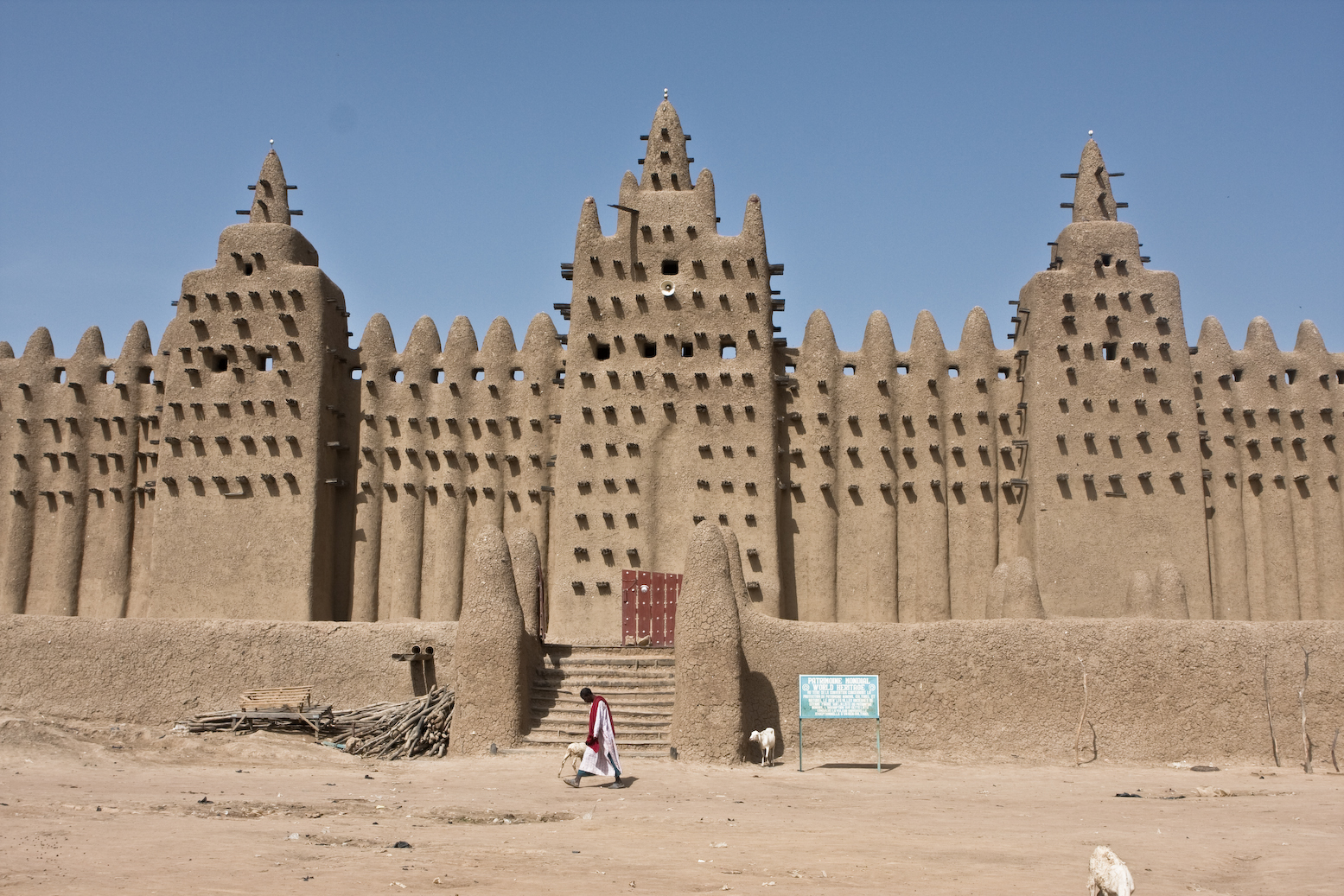
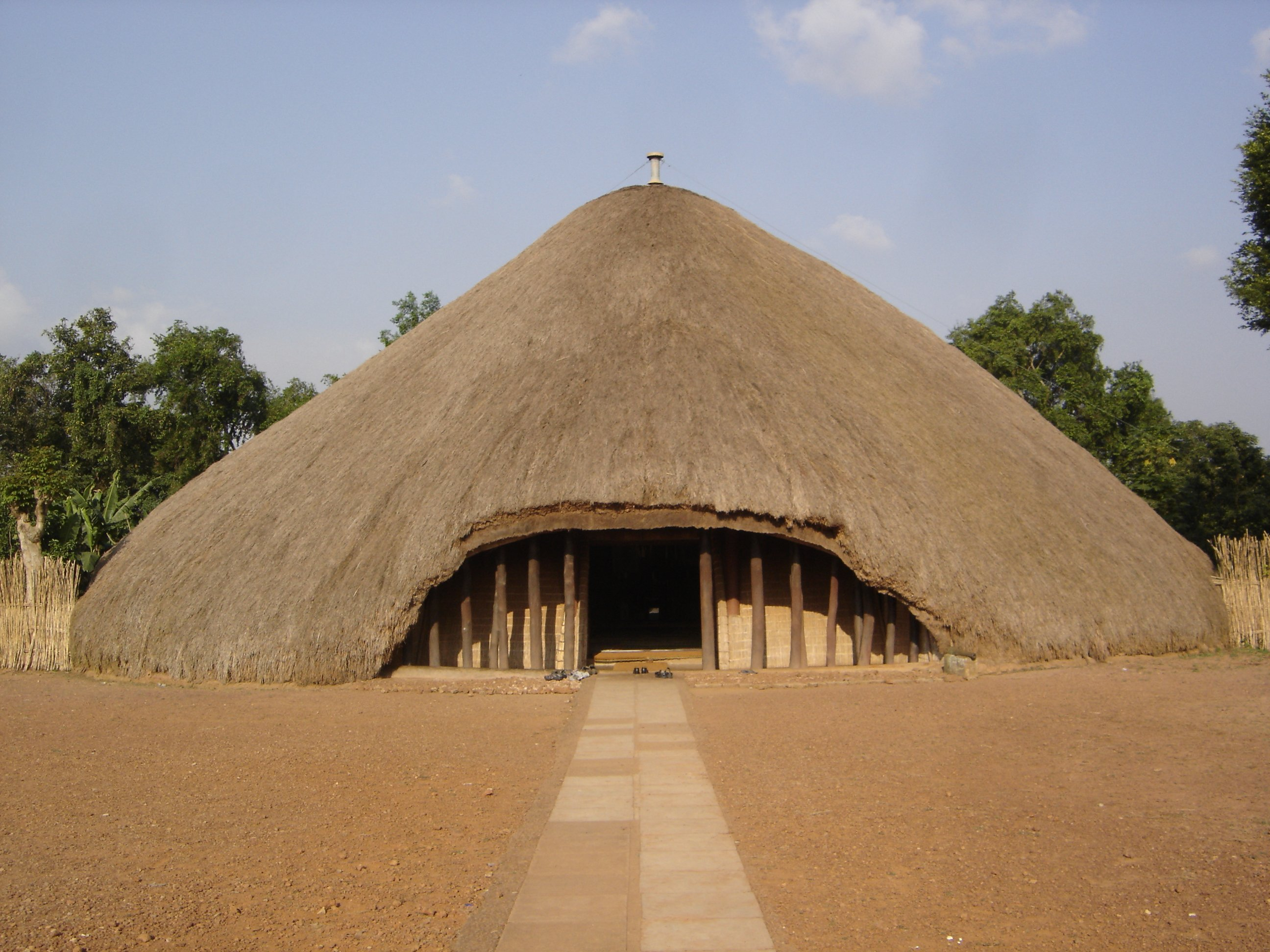
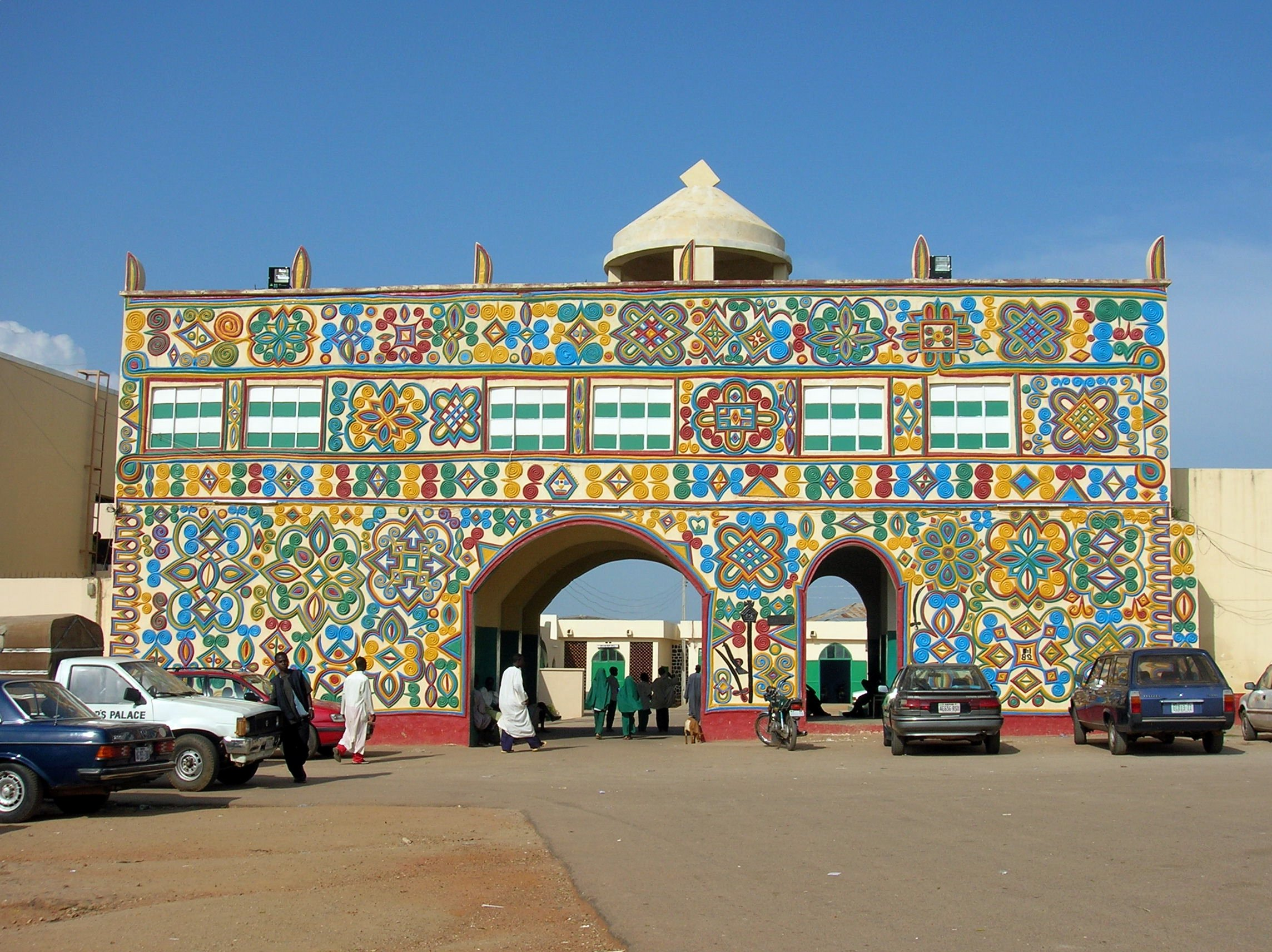
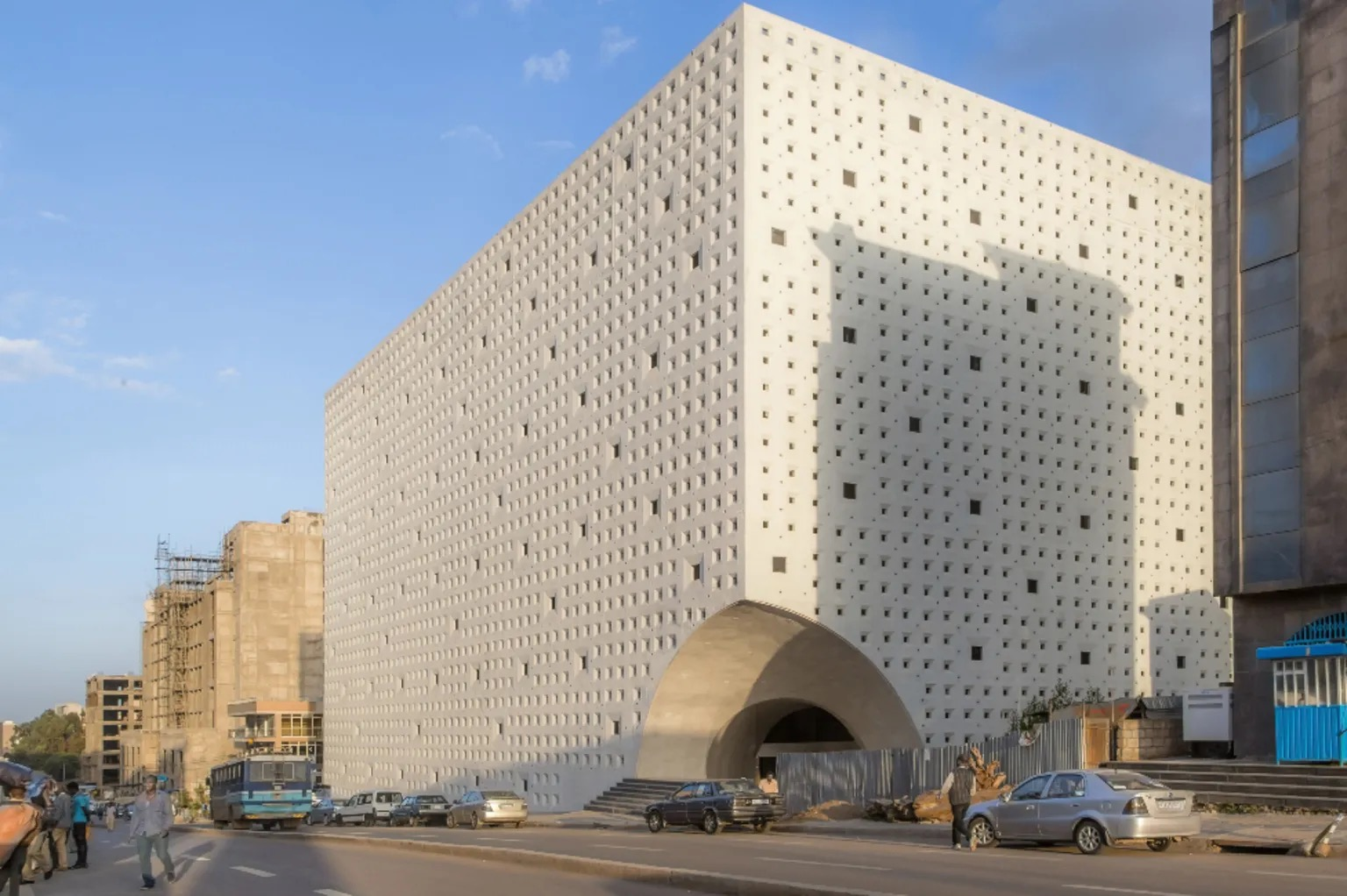
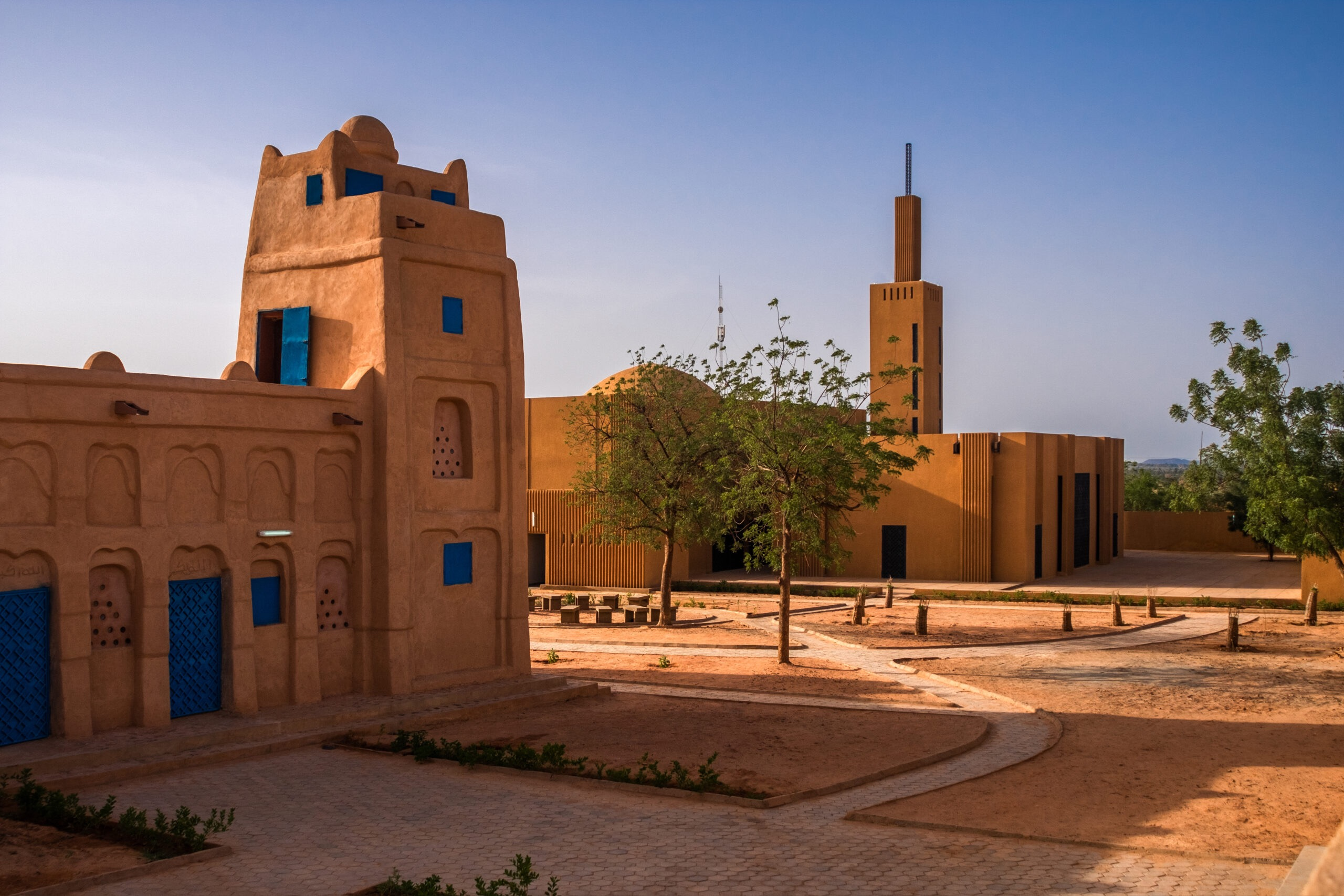
Clockwise from upper left: Great Mosque of Djenne in Mali; Kasubi Tombs in Uganda; Lideta Market in Ethiopia; Hikma Religious and Secular Complex in Niger; Zaria Emir's Palace Gate in Nigeria.

Like other aspects of the culture of Africa, the architecture of Africa is exceptionally diverse. Throughout the history of Africa, Africans have developed their own local architectural traditions. In some cases, broader regional styles can be identified, such as the Sudano-Sahelian architecture of West Africa. A common theme in traditional African architecture is the use of fractal scaling: small parts of the structure tend to look similar to larger parts, such as a circular village made of circular houses.

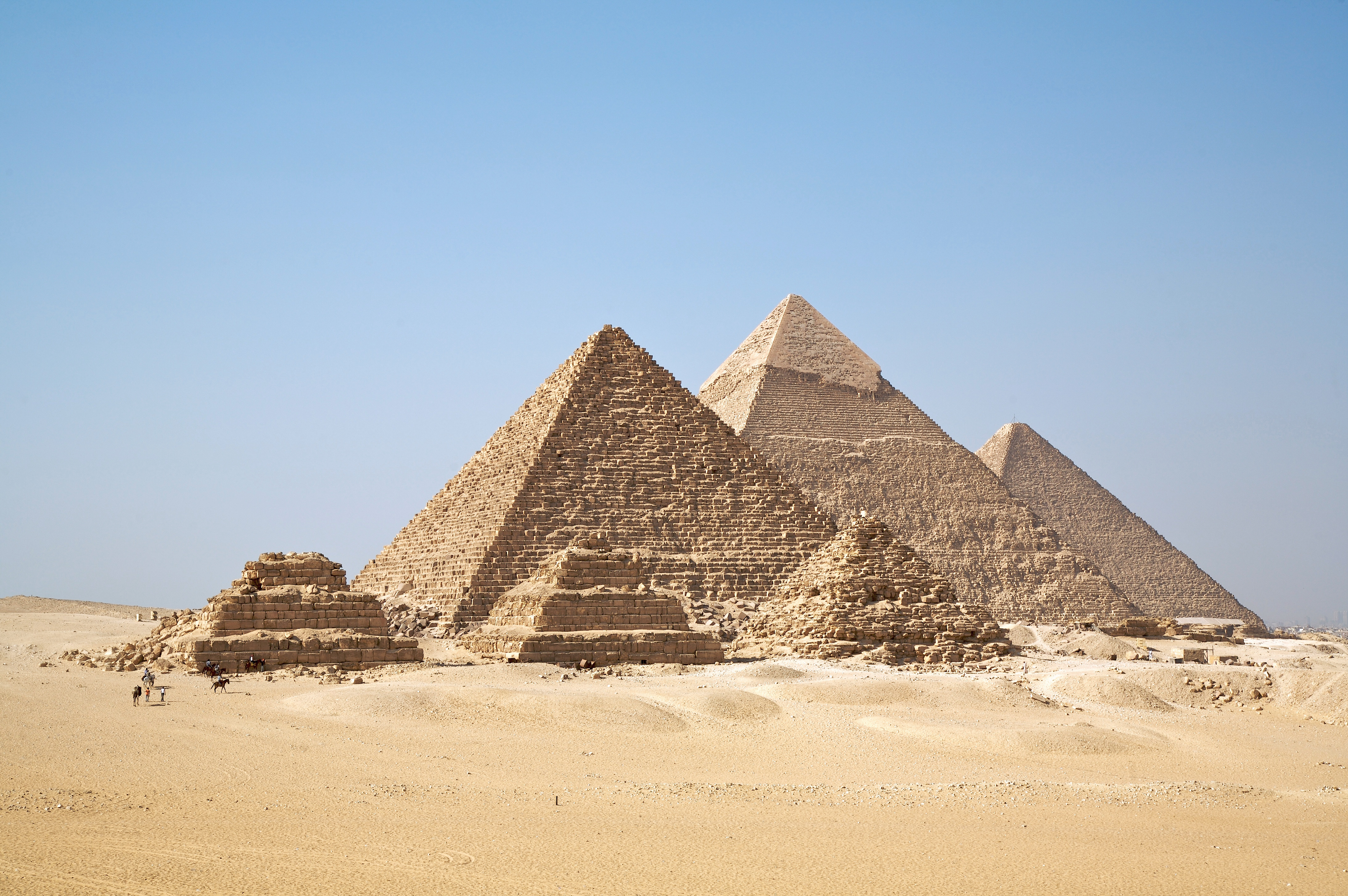
The Great Pyramids of Giza are regarded as one of the greatest architectural feats of all time and are one of the Seven Wonders of the Ancient World.

African architecture in some areas has been influenced by external cultures for centuries, according to available evidence. Western architecture has influenced coastal areas since the late 15th century and is now an important source of inspiration for many larger buildings, particularly in major cities.

African architecture uses a wide range of materials, including thatch, stick/wood, mud, mudbrick, rammed earth, and stone. These material preferences vary by region: North Africa for stone and rammed earth, the Horn of Africa for stone and mortar, West Africa for mud/adobe, Central Africa for thatch/wood and more perishable materials, Southeast and Southern Africa for stone and thatch/wood.

Author Binyavanga Wainaina argues that people from the west would portray Africa as a decrepit and barren land and had failed to look at the wonders of the continent.

== Prehistoric architecture ==
=== North Africa ===
==== Nile Valley ====
Affad 23 is an archaeological site located in the Affad region of southern Dongola Reach in northern Sudan, which hosts "the well-preserved remains of prehistoric camps (relics of the oldest open-air hut in the world) and diverse hunting and gathering loci some 50,000 years old".

==== Central Sahara ====
===== Kel Essuf Period =====
Concealed remnants of dismantled furnished flooring are found in 75% of the Central Saharan rockshelters where Kel Essuf rock artforms are found. The furnished flooring in these rockshelters were likely created for the purpose of collecting water and were subsequently dismantled after the earliest Round Head rock art began to be created. Based on these furnished floors purposed for the collection of spring water, the Kel Essuf rock art, which are cultural facies, may date at least as early as 12,000 BP amid the late period of the Pleistocene. Given the occurrences of furnished flooring for collecting water and production of engraved Kel Essuf rock art, these rockshelters may have been inhabited during periods of decreased availability of local water sources. Consequently, there may have been increasing regional isolation due to adverse climate within the region.

===== Round Head Period =====
At the start of the 10th millennium BP, amid the Epipaleolithic, the walls of rock shelters (e.g., Tin Torha, Tin Hanakaten) were used as a foundation for proto-village huts that families resided in, as well as hearths, which may have been suitable for the mobile lifestyle of semi-sedentary Epipaleolithic hunter-gatherers. Epipaleolithic hunter-gatherers of the Round Head Period built a simple stone wall, dated to 10,508±429 cal BP/9260±290 BP, which may have been used for the purpose of serving as a windbreak.

===== Pastoral Period =====
In the collective memory of Early Pastoral peoples, rockshelters (e.g., Fozzigiaren, Imenennaden, Takarkori) in the Tadrart Acacus region may have served as monumental areas for women and children, as these were where their burial sites were primarily found. Engraved rock art has been found on various kinds of stone structures (e.g., stone arrangements, standing stones, corbeilles – ceremonial monuments) in the Messak Plateau. Stone monuments are also often found in proximity to these engraved Pastoral rock art. A complete cattle pastoral economy (e.g., dairying) developed in the Acacus and Messak regions of southwestern Libya. Semi-sedentary settlements were used seasonally by Middle Pastoral peoples depending on the weather patterns (e.g., monsoon). Wadi Bedis meander had 42 stone monuments (e.g., mostly corbeilles, stone structures and platforms, tumuli). Ceramics (e.g., potsherds) and stone implements were found along with 9 monuments bearing engraved rock art. From 5200 BCE to 3800 BCE, burial of animals occurred. Nine decorated ceramics (e.g., mostly rocker stamp/plain edge design, sometimes alternately pivoting stamp design) and sixteen stone maces were found. Some stone maces, used literally or symbolically to slaughter the cattle (e.g., Bos taurus), were ceremonially set near the head of sacrificed cattle or stone monuments. In 5000 BP, the development of megalithic monuments (e.g., architecture) increased in the Central Sahara. In the Central Sahara, the tumuli tradition originated in the Middle Pastoral Period and transformed amid the Late Pastoral Period (4500 BP – 2500 BP). At Takarkori rockshelter, between 5000 BP and 4200 BP, Late Pastoral peoples herded goats, seasonally (e.g., winter), and began a millennia-long tradition of creating megalithic monuments, utilized as funerary sites where individuals were buried in stone-covered tumuli that were usually away from areas of dwellings in 5000 BP. At Takarkori rockshelter, Final Pastoral peoples created burial sites for several hundred individuals that contained non-local, luxury goods and drum-type architecture in 3000 BP, which made way for the development of the Garamantian civilization.

Pastoralism, possibly along with social stratification, and Pastoral rock art, emerged in the Central Sahara between 5200 BCE and 4800 BCE. Funerary monuments and sites, within possible territories that had chiefdoms, developed in the Saharan region of Niger between 4700 BCE and 4200 BCE. Cattle funerary sites developed in Nabta Playa (6450 BP/5400 cal BCE), Adrar Bous (6350 BP), in Chin Tafidet, and in Tuduf (2400 cal BCE – 2000 cal BCE). Thus, by this time, cattle religion (e.g., myths, rituals) and cultural distinctions between genders (e.g., men associated with bulls, violence, hunting, and dogs as well as burials at monumental funerary sites; women associated with cows, birth, nursing, and possibly the afterlife) had developed. Preceded by assumed earlier sites in the Eastern Sahara, tumuli with megalithic monuments developed as early as 4700 BCE in the Saharan region of Niger. These megalithic monuments in the Saharan region of Niger and the Eastern Sahara may have served as antecedents for the mastabas and pyramids of ancient Egypt. During Predynastic Egypt, tumuli were present at various locations (e.g., Naqada, Helwan). Between 7500 BP and 7400 BP, amid the Late Pastoral Neolithic, religious ceremony and ceremonial burials, with megaliths, may have served as a cultural precedent for the latter religious reverence of the goddess Hathor during the dynastic period of ancient Egypt.

== Early architecture ==
A well-known structure in Africa, the Pyramids of Egypt are an early architectural development, regardless of practicality and origins in a funerary context. Egyptian architectural traditions also favored the building of temple complexes.

Little is known of ancient architecture south and west of the Sahara. Harder to date than the pyramids are the monoliths around the Cross River, which have geometric or human designs. The vast number of Senegambian stone circles is also evidence of an emerging architecture.

=== North Africa ===
Likely part of Copper Age and Bronze Age cultural traditions of megalith-building, megaliths (e.g., dolmens) were constructed in Mediterranean North Africa.

==== Algeria ====
===== Garamantes =====
Some of the earliest evidence of original Amazigh (Berber) culture in North Africa has been found in the highlands of the Sahara and dates from the second millennium BC, when the region was much less arid than it is today and when the Amazigh population was most likely in the process of spreading across North Africa. One of the earliest groups for which there are historical records are the Garamantes, who were later mentioned by Herodotus. Numerous archaeological sites associated with them have been found in the Fezzan (in present-day Libya), attesting to the existence of small villages, towns, and tombs. At least one settlement dates from as early as 1000 BC. The structures were initially built in dry stone, but around the middle of the millennium (c. 500 BC) they began to be built with mudbrick instead. By the second century AD there is evidence of large villas and more sophisticated tombs associated with the aristocracy of this society, in particular at Germa.

==== Egypt ====
===== Ancient Egypt =====
Ancient Egypt's achievements in architecture included pyramids, temples, enclosed cities, canals, and dams. The architecture of this age was not one style, but a set of styles differing over time but with some commonalities. The most famous examples of ancient Egyptian architecture include the Great Pyramids and the Sphinx at Giza, the Temple of Karnak, and the Temple of Abu Simbel. Most buildings were built of locally available mud brick and limestone by levied workers. Columns were typically adorned with capitals decorated to resemble plants important to Egyptian civilization, such as the papyrus plant.

===== Nabta Playa =====
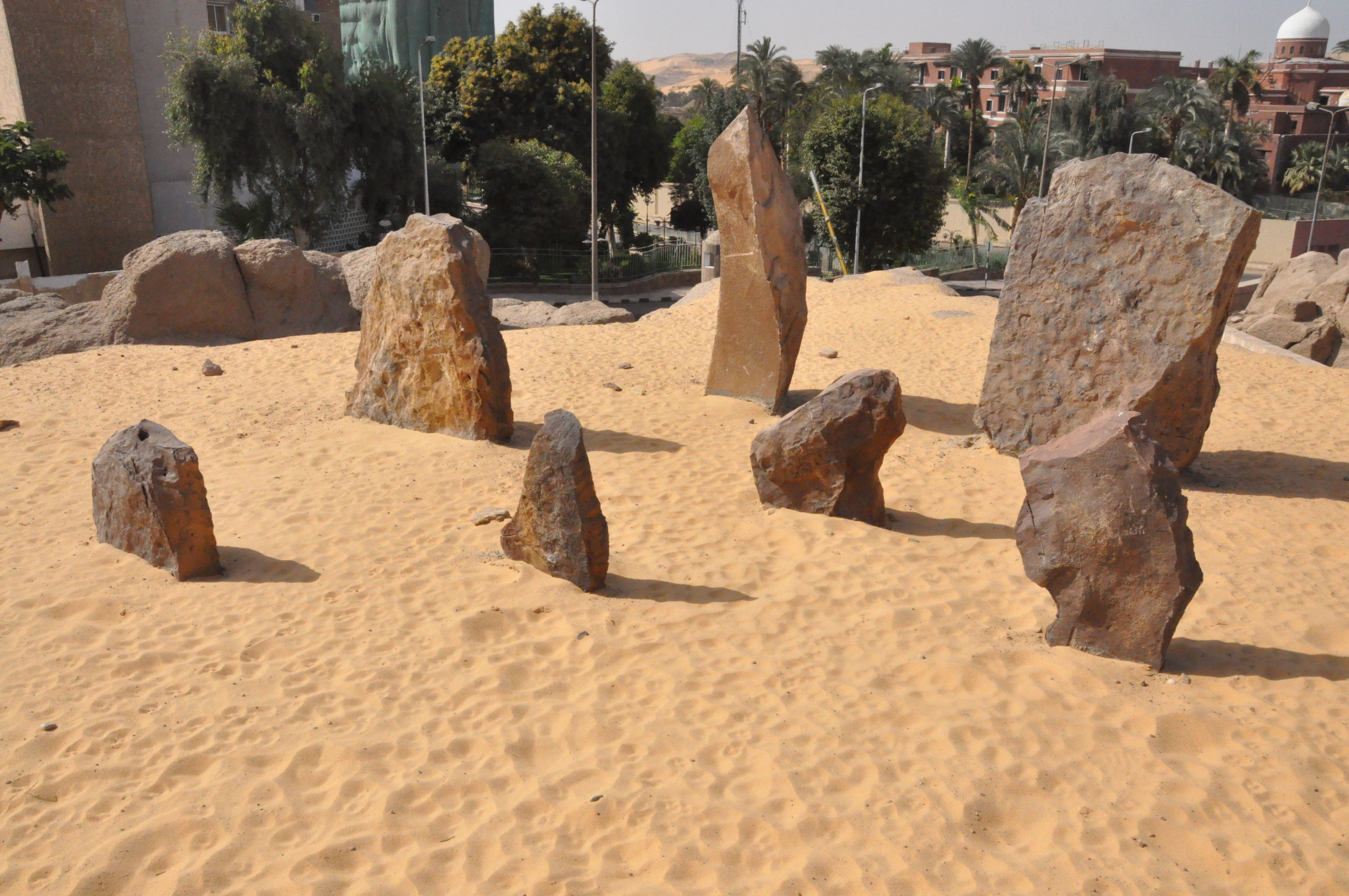
Megaliths from Nabta Playa displayed in the Aswan Nubian museum

At Nabta Playa, located in Egypt and broader region of the Eastern Sahara, there is a megalithic cultural complex (e.g., sacrificed cow burial site, solar calendar, altar) that dates between 4000 BCE and 2000 BCE.

==== Sudan ====
===== Nubia =====
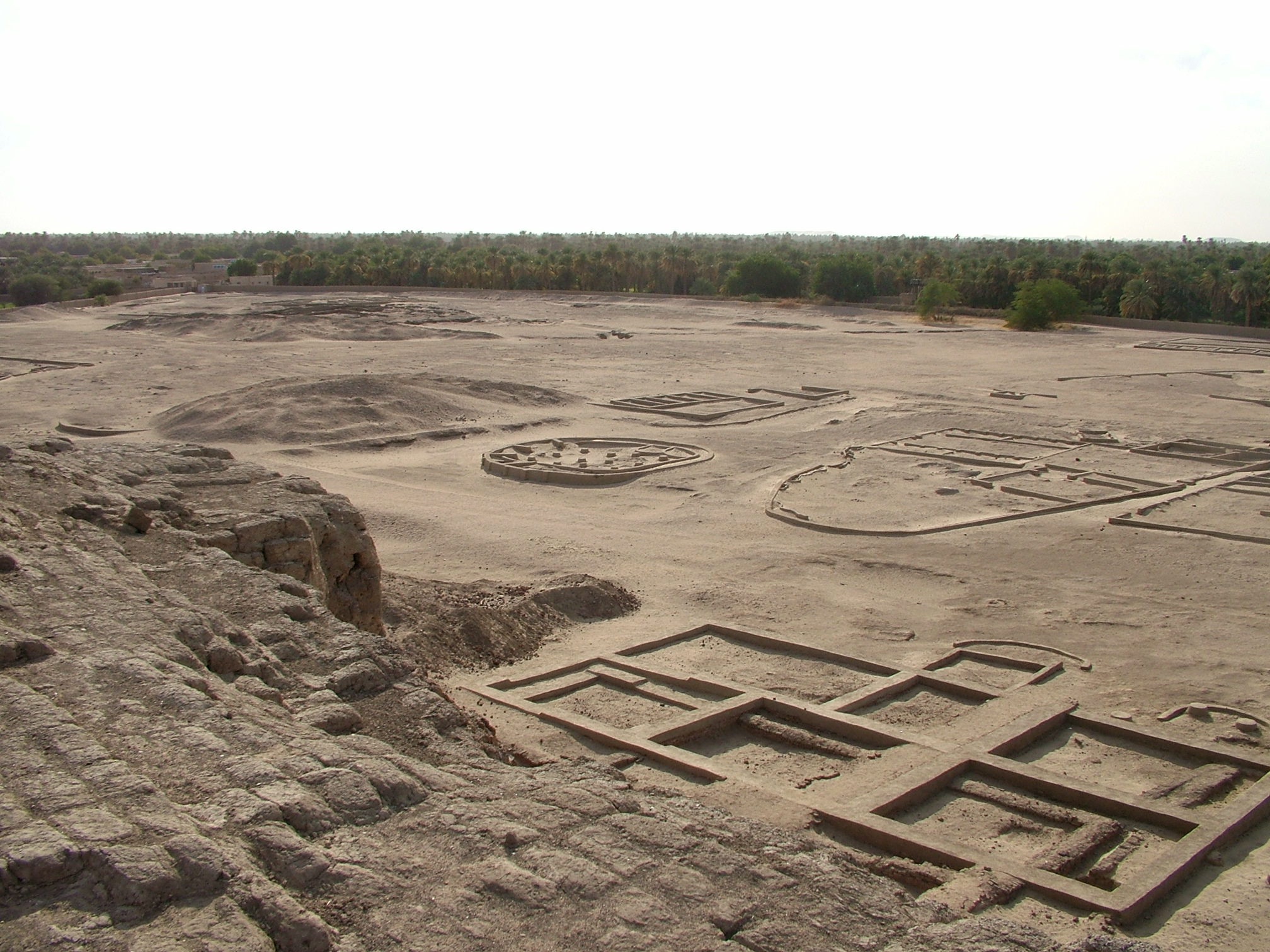
The city of Kerma

Nubian architecture is one of the most ancient in the world. The earliest style of Nubian architecture includes the speos, structures carved out of solid rock under the A-Group culture (3700–3250 BCE). Egyptians borrowed and made extensive use of the process at Speos Artemidos and Abu Simbel. A-Group culture led eventually to the C-Group culture, which began building using light, supple materials—animal skins and wattle and daub—with larger structures of mudbrick later becoming the norm.

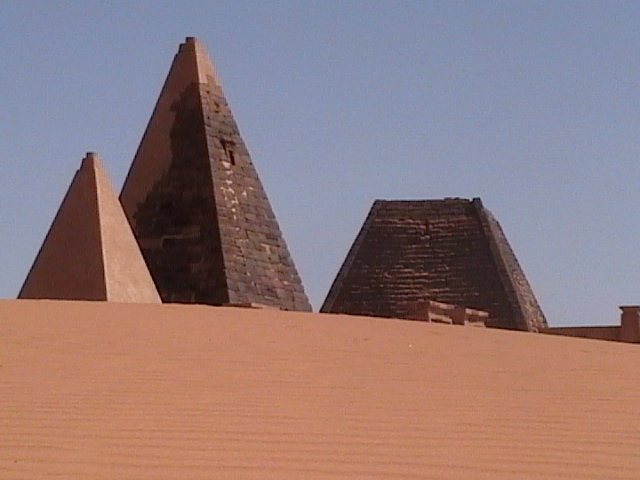
Nubian pyramids at Meroe

The C-Group culture was related to that of the city of Kerma, which was settled around 2400 BCE. It was a walled city containing religious buildings, large circular dwellings, a palace, and well-laid-out roads. On the east side of the city, a funerary temple and chapel were laid out. It supported a population of 2,000. One of its most enduring structures was the Deffufa, a mudbrick temple, on top of which ceremonies were performed.

Between 1500 and 1085 BCE, Egypt conquered and dominated Nubia, which brought about the Napatan phase of Nubian history: the birth of the Kingdom of Kush. Kush was immensely influenced by Egypt and eventually conquered Egypt. During this phase, we see the building of numerous pyramids and temples. Gebel Barkal, in the town of Napata, was a significant site, where Kushite pharaohs received legitimacy.

Thirteen temples and two palaces have been excavated in Napata, which has yet to be fully excavated. Sudan contains 223 Nubian pyramids, more numerous but smaller than the Egyptian pyramids, at three major sites: El Kurru, Nuri, and Meroe. The elements of Nubian pyramids, built for kings and queens, included steep walls, a chapel facing east, a stairway facing east, and a chamber accessed via the stairway. The Meroe site has the most pyramids and is considered the largest archaeological site in the world. Around 350 CE, the area was invaded by the Kingdom of Aksum and the Napatan kingdom collapsed.

==== Tunisia ====
===== Carthage =====
Large regions of North Africa, particularly near the coasts, came under the control of Carthage at the height of its power in the third century BCE. The remains of Carthage are found near Tunis today and contain the remains of multiple periods ranging from the Punic period (Phoenician Carthage) to the later Arab occupation. Vestiges of the Carthaginian Empire include the "Punic Ports" (the city's harbors) and a sanctuary and necropolis dedicated to Baal Hammon, known today as the Sanctuary of Tophet.

After defeating Carthage, Rome progressively took over the entire coast of North Africa from Egypt to the Atlantic coast of modern-day Morocco. Major Roman sites in present-day Tunisia (the former Roman province known as Africa) include Roman Carthage, the amphitheater of El Jem, and the sites of Dougga (Thugga) and Sbeitla (Sufetula). Well-preserved sites in Libya include Sabratha and Leptis Magna. In Algeria, major sites include Timgad, Djémila, and Tipasa. In Morocco, cities such as Septa (Ceuta), Sala Colonia (Chellah), and Volubilis were founded or developed by Romans and retain remnants of their architecture.

===== Numidia =====
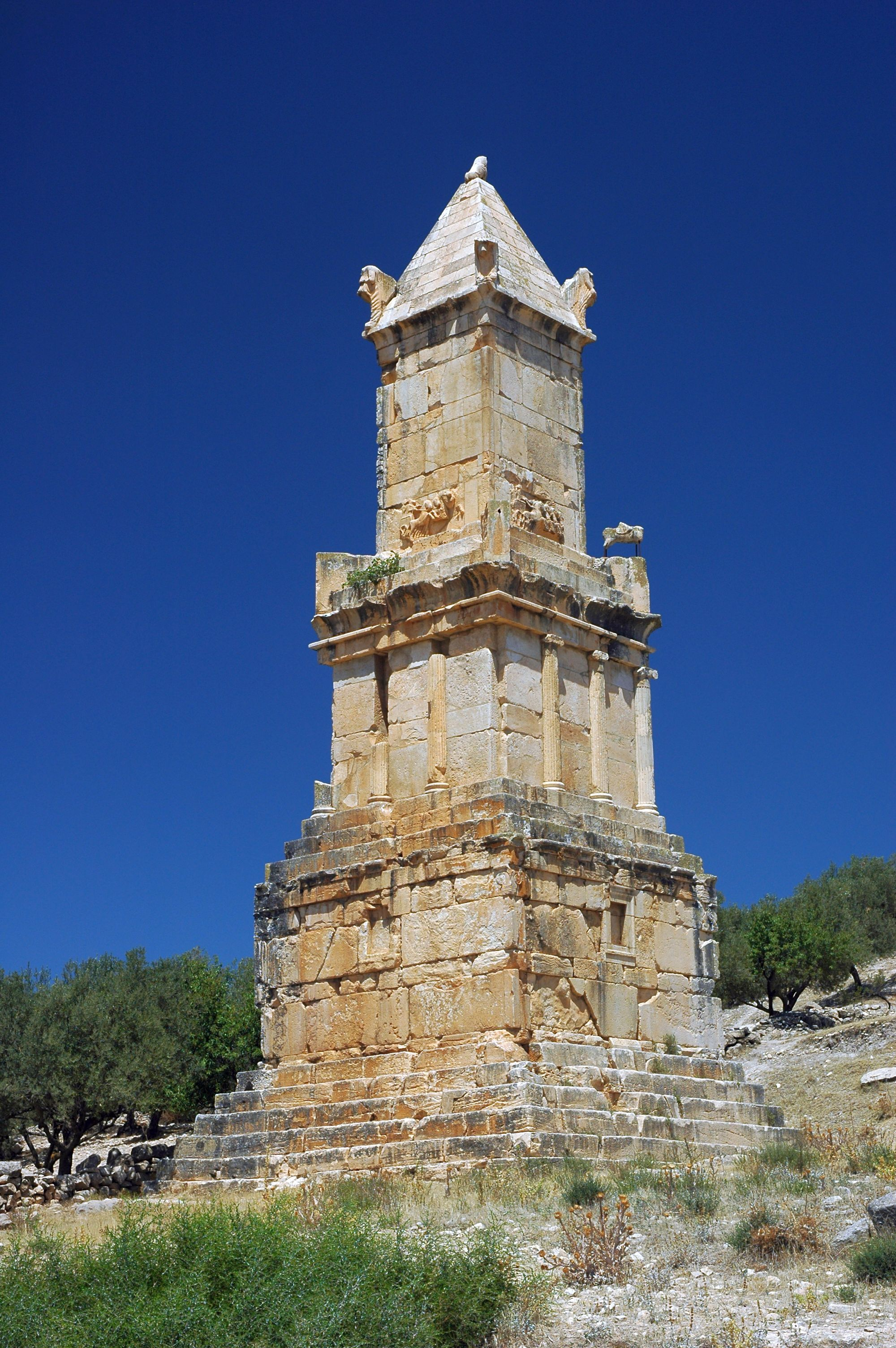
Numidian mausoleum of Dougga (2nd century BCE, present-day Tunisia)

Further west, the kingdom of Numidia was contemporary with the Phoenician civilization of Carthage and the Roman Republic. Among other things, the Numidians have left thousands of pre-Christian tombs. The oldest of these is Medracen in present-day Algeria, believed to date from the time of Masinissa (202–148 BCE). Possibly influenced by Greek architecture further east, or built with the help of Greek craftsmen, the tomb consists of a large tumulus constructed in well-cut ashlar masonry and featuring sixty Doric columns and an Egyptian-style cornice. Another famous example is the Royal Mausoleum of Mauretania in western Algeria. This structure consists of columns, a dome, and spiral pathways that lead to a single chamber. A number of "tower tombs" from the Numidian period can also be found in sites from Algeria to Libya. Despite their wide geographic range, they often share a similar style: a three-story structure topped by a convex pyramid. They may have initially been inspired by Greek monuments but they constitute an original type of structure associated with Numidian culture. Examples of these are found at Siga, Soumaa d'el Khroub, Dougga, and Sabratha.

=== West Africa ===
==== Burkina Faso ====
===== Mouhoun Bend =====
At Mouhoun Bend, Burkina Faso, people dwelled in a community of residences that housed multiple families in the second quarter of the 1st millennium BCE, which may have also been part of a pre-existing marketplace system of trade (e.g., salt) and technology transfer between agricultural communities (e.g., Jenne-Jeno, Kintampo, Rim) throughout West Africa that persisted from the 2nd millennium BCE to the early 1st millennium CE. In addition to farming undomesticated crops and maintaining domesticated animals, the people of Mouhoun Bend engaged in hunting and fishing as well as iron, salt, and pottery production. The funerary culture of the Mouhoun Bend people included ceremonial placement of food and material goods in pits and concave surfaces as well as the development of earth structures.

==== Mauritania ====
===== Tichitt culture =====
Tichitt Walata is the oldest surviving collection of settlements in West Africa and the oldest of all stone-base settlement south of the Sahara. It was built by the Soninke people and is thought to be the precursor of the Ghana Empire. It was settled by agropastoral people around 2000–300 BCE, which makes it almost 1000 years older than previously thought. One finds well-laid-out streets and fortified compounds, all made out of skilled stone masonry. In all, there were 500 settlements.

The Tichitt Tradition of eastern Mauritania dates from 2200 BCE to 200 BCE. By 2000 BCE, as aridification followed the Holocene Climate Optimum, the pastoralists had become agropastoralists and had established the Tichitt tradition in the Mauritanian settlement areas of Dhar Tichitt, Dhar Walata, and Dhar Néma, based on a hierarchical economy composed of pastoralism, agriculture (e.g., millet), and stonemasonry (e.g., architecture). In the Sahelian region of West Africa, the corded roulette ceramics of the Tichitt Tradition developed and persisted among dry stonewalled architecture in Mauritania (e.g., Dhar Tichitt, Dhar Walata, Dhar Néma, Dhar Tagant) between 1900 BCE and 400 BCE. Within these settled areas (e.g., Dhar Tichitt, Dhar Tagant, Dhar Walata) with stone walls, which vary in scale from (e.g., 2 hectares, 80 hectares), there were walled agricultural land utilized for livestock or gardening as well as land with granaries and tumuli.

As areas where the Tichitt cultural tradition were present, Dhar Tichitt and Dhar Walata were occupied more frequently than Dhar Néma. The eastern and central areas of Dhar Walata and Dhar Tichitt, which were primarily peopled between 2200/2000 BCE and 1200/1000 BCE and contained some areas (e.g., Akreijit, Chebka, Khimiya) with boundary walls, served as the primary areas of settlement (e.g., small villages, hamlets, seasonal camps) for the Dhars of Mauritania. The fundamental unit of the Mauritanian Dhars (e.g., Dhar Néma, Dhar Walata, Dhar Tichitt) was the extended family or polygamous family. Based on the presence of an abundant amount of enclosed areas that may have been used to pen cattle and hundreds of tumuli, intergenerational ownership of property, via cattle wealth, may have been part of the Tichitt culture. Planned, level streets spanned several hundred kilometers among the 400 drystone-constructed villages, hamlets, and towns. Primary entry points of residences with access ramps (e.g., fortified, non-fortified) and watchtowers were also present. Households used various tools (e.g., arrowheads, axes, borers, grindstones, grooved stones, needles, pendants). At Dhar Walata and Dhar Tichitt, stone pillars, stone slabs, and stone blocks, which approximate to several hundred in total, are frequently arranged and aligned in three rows of three; these erected stones may have served as stilts for granaries. There were also gardens and fields located within a walled enclosure ranging between nine and fourteen hectares. At Dhar Nema, there are also stilted granaries, pottery, and tools used for milling. At Dhar Walata and Dhar Tichitt, copper was also utilized.

====== Dhar Tichitt ======
At Dhar Tichitt, Dakhlet el Atrouss I, which is the largest archaeological site of the Tichitt Tradition and is 80 hectares in scale, serves as the primary regional center for the multi-tiered hierarchical social structure of Tichitt culture; it features nearly 600 settlement compounds, agropastoralism, a large enclosure for cattle, and monumental architecture as an aspect of its funerary culture, such as hundreds of tumuli nearby. Along with Akrejit, it also features foundations for granaries.

====== Dhar Walata/Oualata ======
At Dhar Walata, in the courtyard of nearby houses, enclosed, erected turriform gardens have been found, the earliest of which dates between 1894 cal BCE and 1435 cal BCE. Hoes and fish hooks made of bone were also found. Stone slabs may have been used as a ballast in order to avert the entry of animals into the village. Reservoirs and dams may have been used to manage water from nearby rivers (wadis). Millet, flour, and semolina may have been prepared to cook porridge.

====== Dhar Néma ======
In the late period of the Tichitt Tradition at Dhar Néma, tamed pearl millet was used to temper the tuyeres of an oval-shaped low shaft furnace; this furnace was one out of 16 iron furnaces located on elevated ground. Iron metallurgy may have developed before the second half of 1st millennium BCE, as indicated by pottery dated between 800 BCE and 200 BCE.

====== Dhar Tagant ======
At Dhar Tagant, there are approximately 276 tumuli that have been surveyed. At Dhar Tagant, there are also various geometric (e.g., rectilinear, circular) constructions, and a possible late period, involving a funerary tomb with a chapel at Foum el Hadjar from 1st millennium CE and wadis with evidence of crocodiles. As part of a broader trend of iron metallurgy developed in the West African Sahel amid 1st millennium BCE, iron items (350 BCE – 100 CE) were found at Dhar Tagant, iron metalworking and/or items (800 BCE – 400 BCE) were found at Dia Shoma and Walaldé, and the iron remnants (760 BCE – 400 BCE) found at Bou Khzama and Djiganyai.

==== Niger ====
In Niger, there are two monumental tumuli – a cairn burial (5695 BP – 5101 BP) at Adrar Bous, and a tumulus covered with gravel (6229 BP – 4933 BP) at Iwelen, in the Aïr Mountains. Tenerians did not construct the two monumental tumuli at Adrar Bous and Iwelen. Rather, Tenerians constructed cattle tumuli at a time before the two monumental tumuli were constructed.

==== Nigeria ====
Nok culture artifacts—located on the Jos Plateau in Nigeria, between the Niger River and Benue River—have been dated as far back as 790 BCE. The excavation of the Nok settlement in Samun Dikiya shows a tendency to build on hill tops and mountain peaks. However, Nok settlements have not been extensively excavated.

In the central region of Nigeria, Nok archaeological sites are determined to be settlement sites, on the basis of archaeological evidence discovered at the surface level of the sites, and determined to be of the Nok culture, on the basis of the type of archaeological evidence discovered, specifically, Nok terracotta remnants and Nok pottery. Mountaintops are where the majority of Nok settlement sites are found. At the settlement site of Kochio, the edge of a cellar of a settlement wall was chiseled from a granite foundation. Additionally, a megalithic stone fence was constructed around the enclosed settlement site of Kochio.

==== Senegambia ====
Between 1350 BCE and 1500/1600 CE, Senegambian megaliths (e.g., tumuli) were constructed for the purpose of ancestral reverence.

At Wanar, Senegal, megalithic monolith-circles and tumuli (1300/1100 BCE – 1400/1500 CE) were constructed by West Africans who had a complex hierarchical society. In the mid-region of the Senegal River Valley, the Serer people may have created tumuli (before 13th century CE), shell middens (7th century CE – 13th century CE) in the central-west region, and shell middens (200 BCE – Present) in the southern region. The funerary tumuli-building tradition of West Africa was widespread and a regular practice amid 1st millennium CE. More than ten thousand large funerary tumuli exist in Senegal.

=== Eastern Africa ===
==== Ethiopia ====
In the Ethiopian Highlands of Harar, the earliest construction of megaliths occurred. From this region and its megalith-building tradition (e.g., dolmens, tumuli with burial chambers organized in cemeteries), the subsequent traditions in other areas of Ethiopia likely developed. In the late 1st millennium BCE, the urban civilization of Axum developed a megalithic stelae-building tradition, which commemorated Axumite royalty and elites, that persisted until the Christian period of Axum. In the Sidamo Province, the megalithic monoliths of the stelae-building cultural tradition were utilized as tombstones in cemeteries (e.g., Arussi, Konso, Sedene, Tiya, Tuto Felo), and have engraved anthropomorphic features (e.g., swords, masks), phallic form, and some of that served as markers of territory. Sidamo Province has the most megaliths in Ethiopia.

===== Aksumite =====
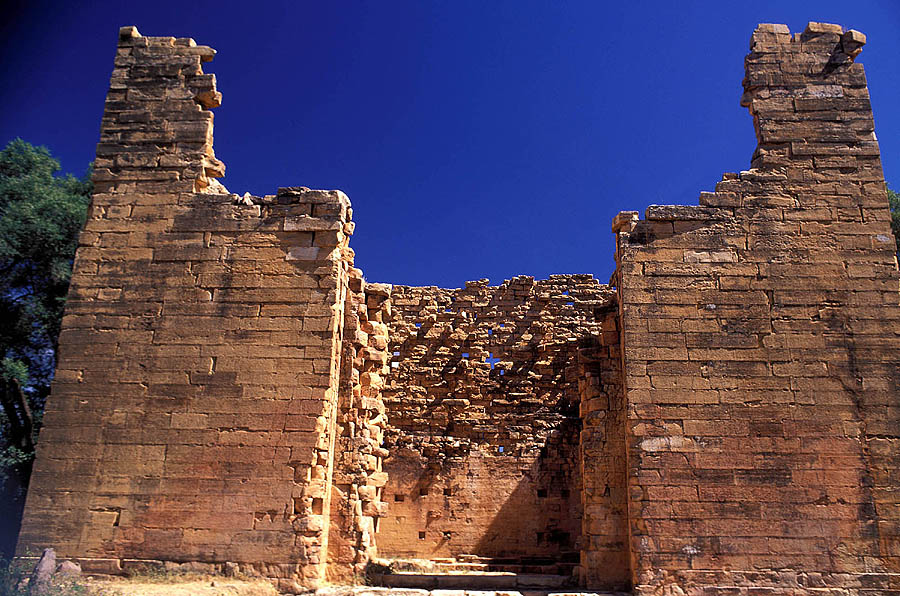
The ruin of the temple at Yeha, Ethiopia

Aksumite architecture flourished in the Ethiopian region, as attested by the numerous Aksumite influences in and around the medieval churches of Lalibela, where stelae (hawilts) and, later, entire churches were carved out of single blocks of rock. Other monumental structures include massive underground tombs often located beneath stelae. Other well-known structures employing monolithic construction include the Tomb of the False Door, and the tombs of Kaleb and Gebre Mesqel in Axum.

Most structures, however—such as palaces, villas, commoner's houses, and other churches and monasteries—were built of alternating layers of stone and wood. Some examples of this style had whitewashed exteriors and/or interiors, such as the medieval 12th-century monastery of Yemrehanna Krestos, which was built in Aksumite style. Contemporary houses were one-room stone structures, two-storey square houses, or roundhouses of sandstone with basalt foundations. Villas were generally two-to-four storeys tall and had sprawling rectangular plans (cf. Dungur ruins). A good example of still-standing Aksumite architecture is the monastery of Debre Damo from the 6th century.

==== Kenya ====
In 2nd millennium BCE, Namoratunga (Monolith Circles) megaliths were constructed as burials the eastern Turkana region of northwestern Kenya.

=== Central Africa ===
Between late 3rd millennium BCE and mid-2nd millennium CE, megaliths (e.g., monuments, cairn burials) were constructed in the regions (e.g., Eastern Adamawa, Oubanguian Ridge, Chad/Congo watershed) in Central African Republic and Cameroon, throughout various periods (e.g., Balimbé: 2000 BCE – 1000 BCE; Early Gbabiri: 950 BCE – 200 BCE; Late Gbabiri: 200 BCE – 500 CE; Bouboun: 500 CE – 1600 CE), for various purposes (e.g., ritual practices, territorial marking).

==== Chad ====
===== Sao Civilization =====
Sao civilization sites of walled-cities are in the Lake Chad region, along the Chari River; the oldest site—at Zilum, Chad—dates to at least the first millennium.

== Medieval architecture ==
=== North Africa ===
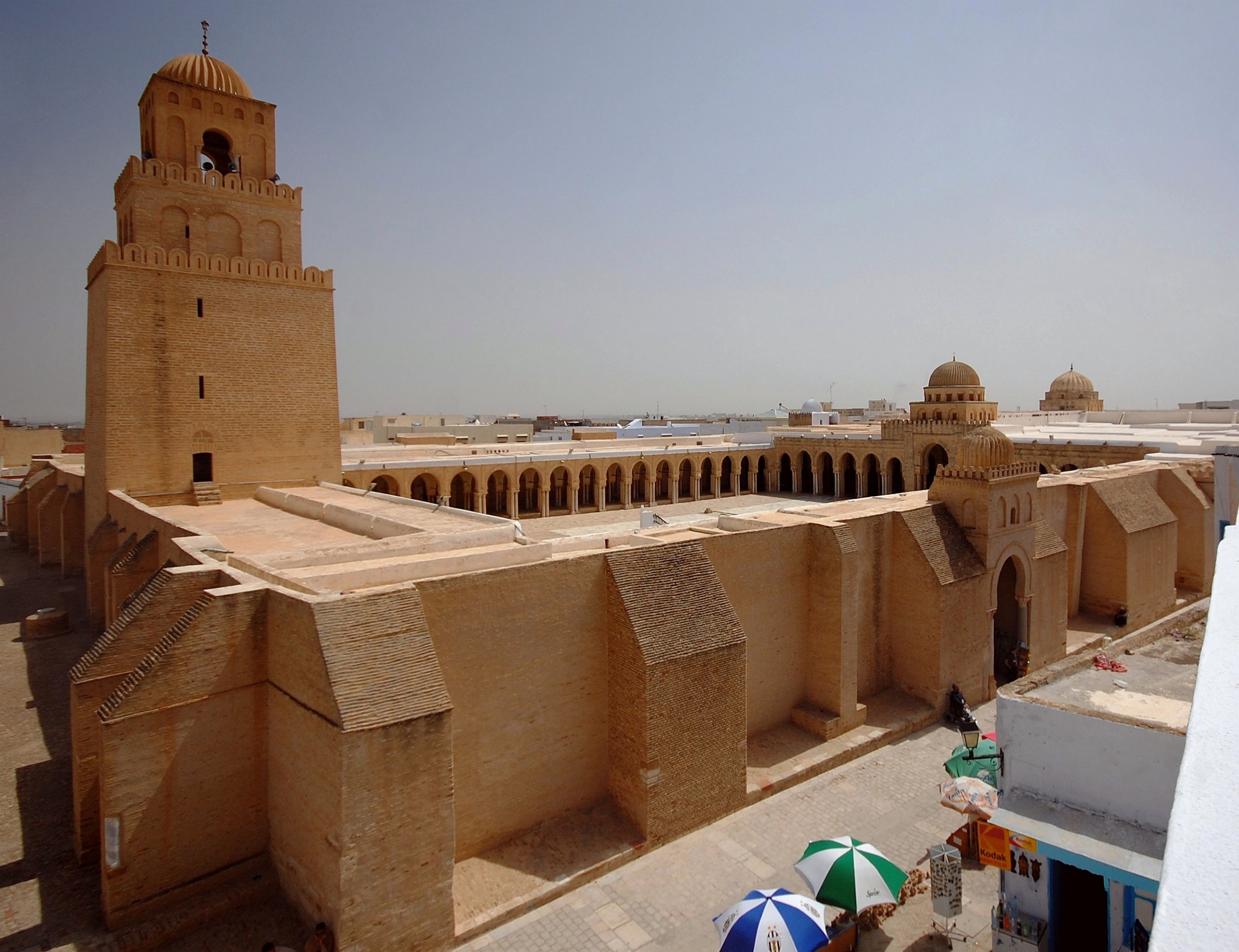
The Great Mosque of Kairouan in Kairouan, Tunisia (7th to 9th centuries)

The Islamic conquest of North Africa saw the development of Islamic architecture in the region. Some of the early major monuments include the Great Mosque of Kairouan, founded in 670 and mostly rebuilt in its current form during the 9th century, and the Ibn Tulun Mosque in Cairo, built in the 9th century. In the western part of North Africa, known as the Maghreb, the "Moorish" style of architecture developed over time, with strong cultural connections to Al-Andalus, the Islamic society of the Iberian Peninsula. Around 1000 AD, cob (tabya) first appears in the Maghreb and al-Andalus. To the east, Egypt continued to be more closely connected with the Levant and the rest of the Middle East.

==== Tunisia ====
Ifriqiya (roughly present-day Tunisia) was an important province of Islamic North Africa, with Kairouan serving as a major cultural and political center for much of its history. Under the Aghlabids (9th century), the Great Mosque of Kairouan was rebuilt and Abbasid architectural innovations, such as the minaret, were introduced for the first time in North Africa. Under the Fatimids (10th century), Ifriqiya was temporarily the center of a new caliphate in rivalry with the Abbasid Caliphate to the east. The Fatimids initially eschewed some of the trends of Abbasid architecture (e.g. minarets), while following some of the established forms (e.g. the hypostyle format of mosques) and introducing new elements (e.g. monumental entrance portals for mosques). They also founded new capital cities including Mahdia on the coast and al-Mansuriya near Kairouan. After the Fatimids departed to Cairo, the Zirids were left in charge in the late 10th century until they were succeeded by the Almohads in the 12th century. The latter introduced some of their own architectural trends, as seen in the Kasbah Mosque of Tunis which bears strong resemblance to Almohad mosque architecture in Marrakesh. The Almohads in Ifriqiya were soon succeeded by the Hafsids, under whose long dominion the center of power and patronage shifted to Tunis and the region's architecture increasingly deviated from that of the western Maghreb and al-Andalus. Madrasas were first built during the Hafsid period and quickly proliferated. After the advent of Ottoman rule in the 16th century some elements and traditions of Ottoman architecture, such as the use of pointed minarets and the creation of multi-functional religious complexes, began to penetrate local architecture, especially among the monuments built by or associated with the new Ottoman elites.

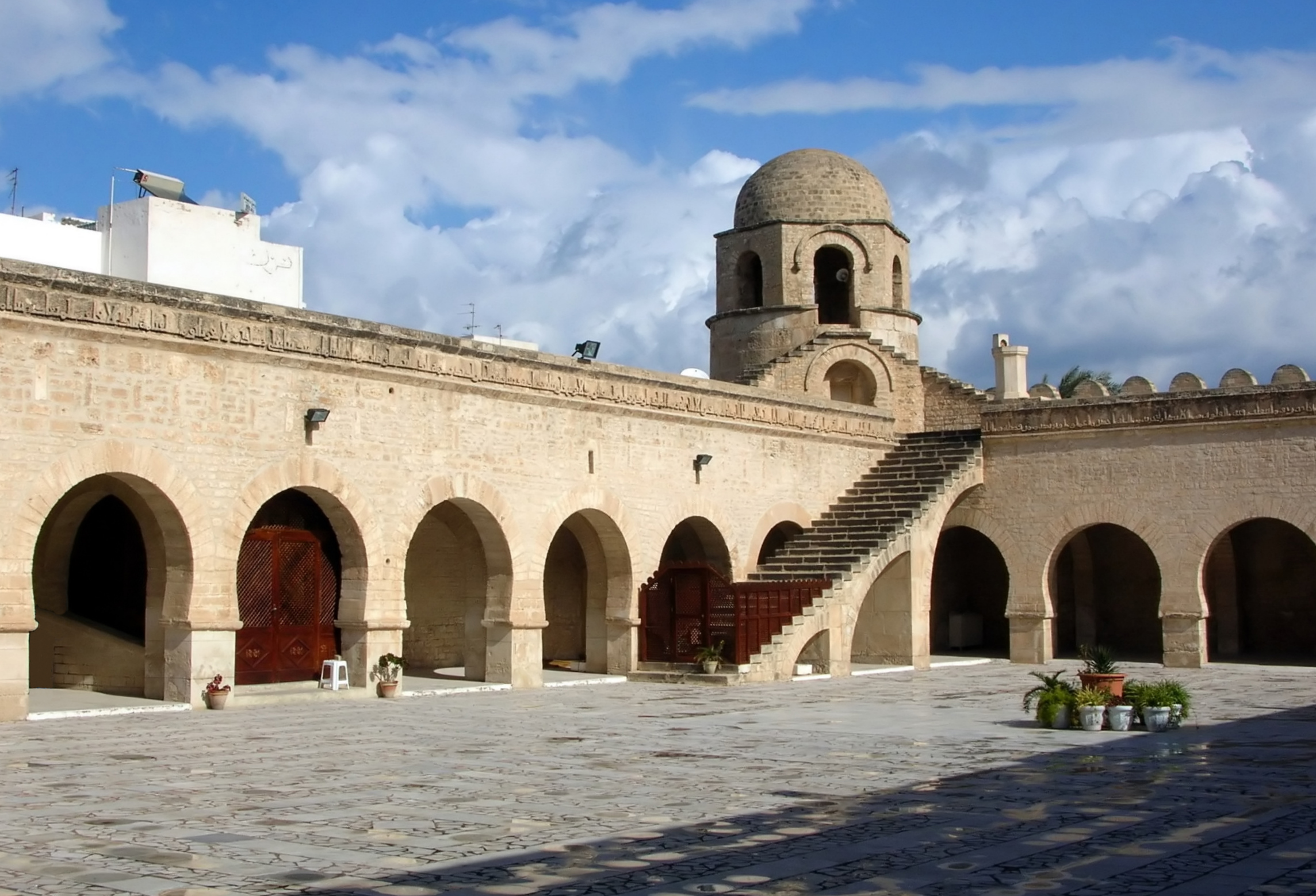
Great Mosque of Sousse (9th century)

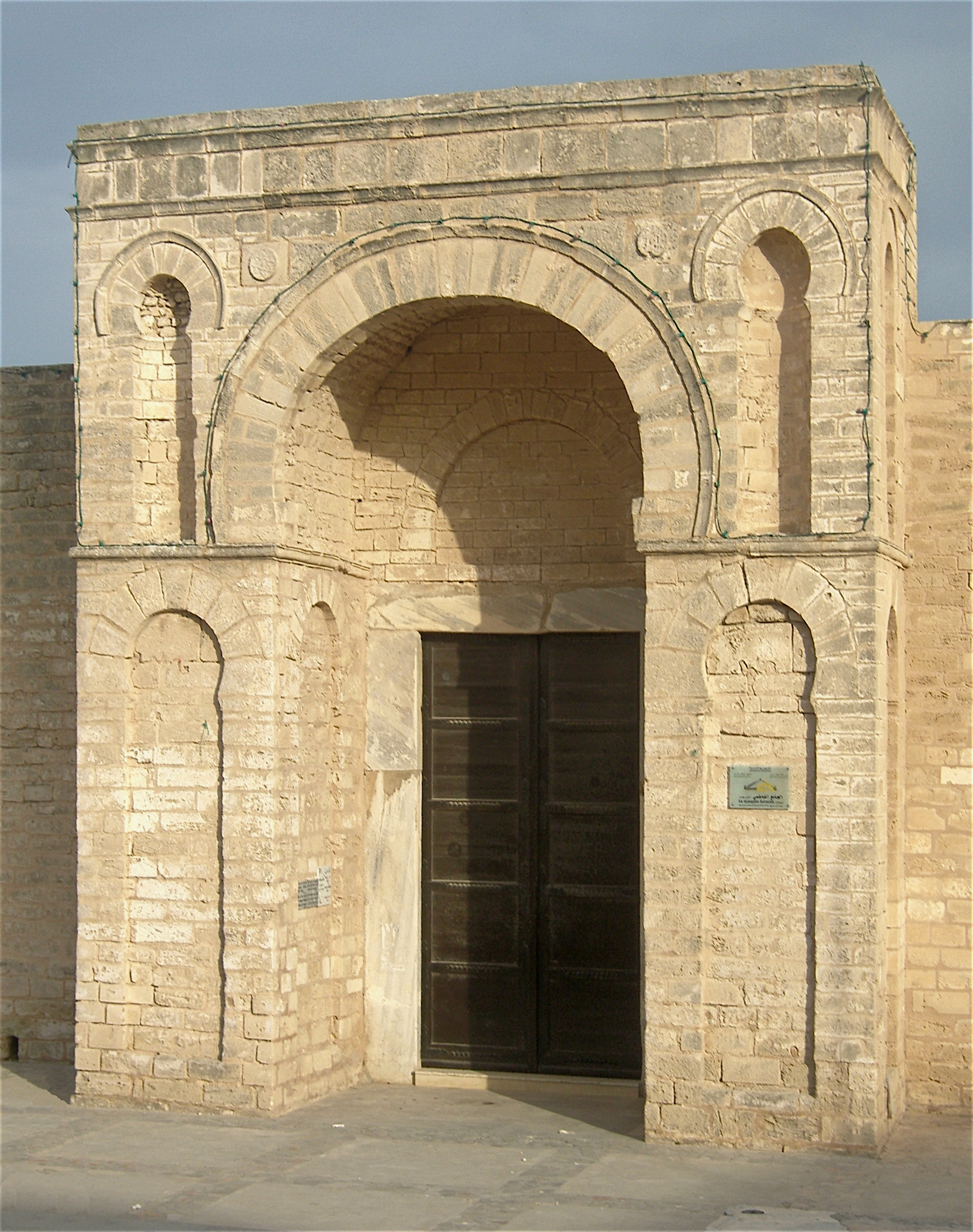
Entrance of the Fatimid Great Mosque of Mahdia (10th century)

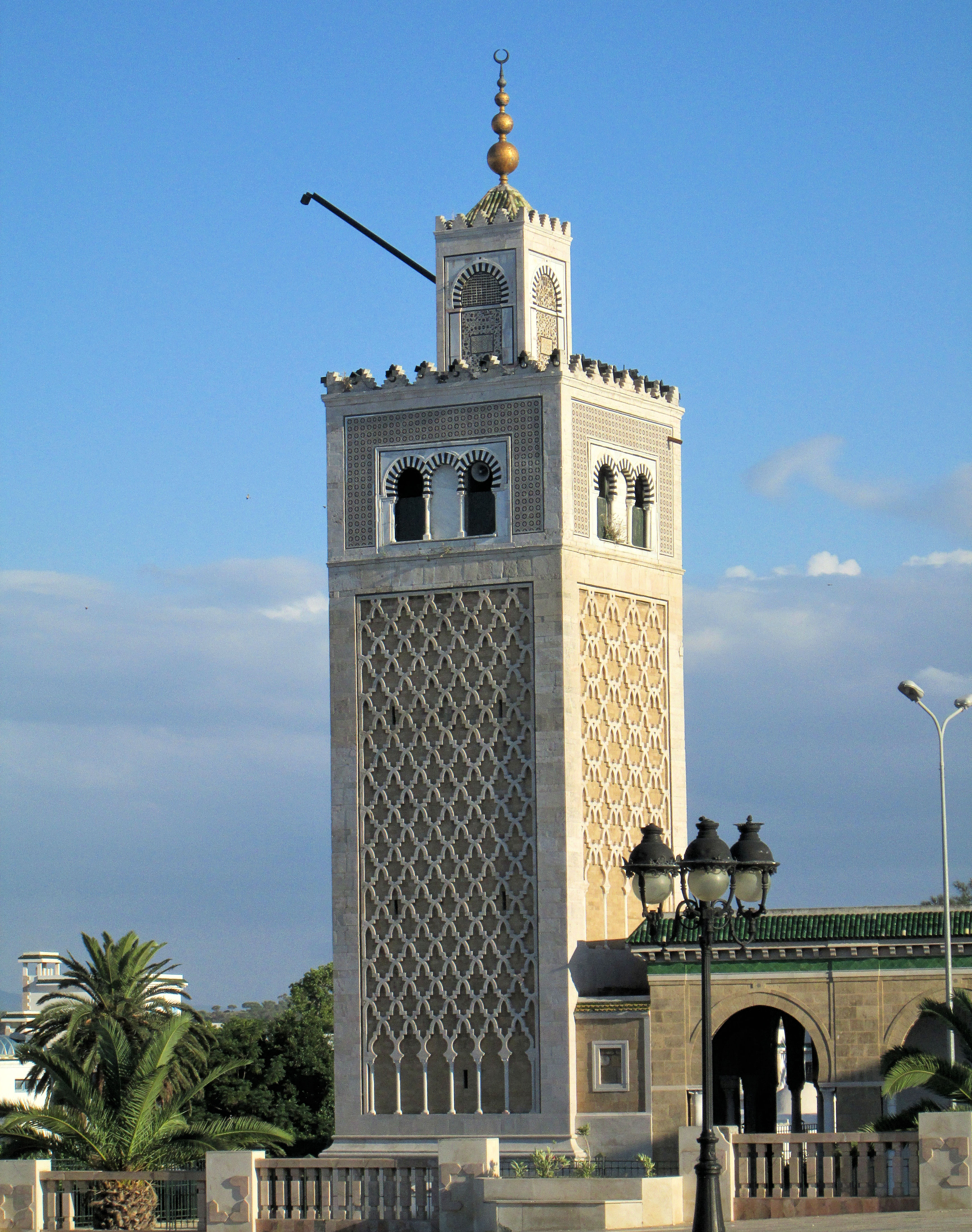
Kasbah Mosque of Tunis (13th century)

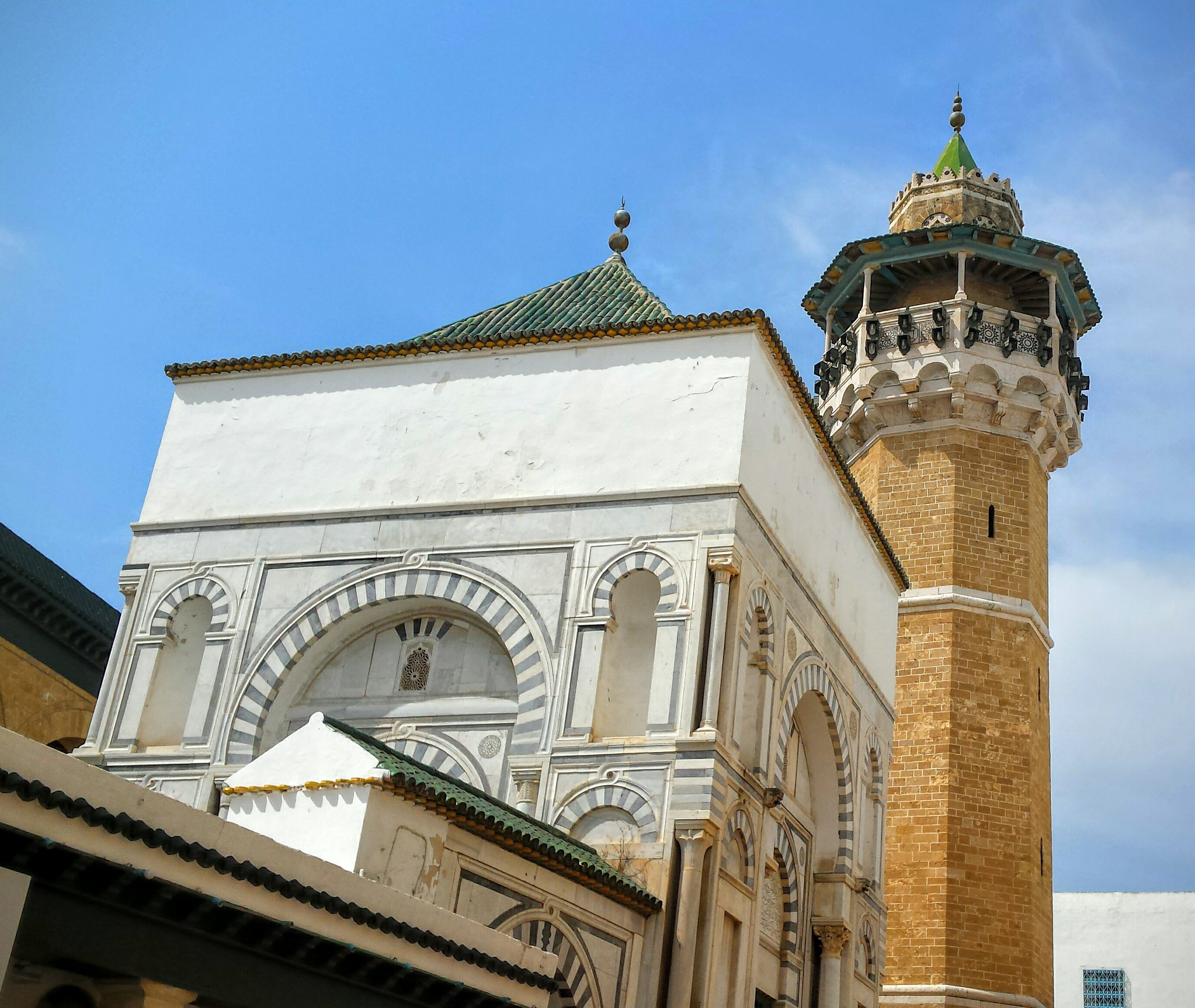
Mosque and mausoleum of Youssef Dey in Tunis (17th century)

==== Algeria ====
The territory of present-day Algeria was ruled by various dynasties in the early Islamic period, including the Rustamids, the Idrisids (and their Sulaymanid branch), and the Zirids. In the 10th century the Zirids built a palace at 'Ashir (near the present town of Kef Lakhdar) that is one of the oldest palaces in the Maghreb to have been discovered and excavated by archeologists. The Hammadids, an offshoot of the Zirids, based themselves in Algeria and in 1007 they founded an entirely new fortified capital known as Qala'at Bani Hammad, northeast of present-day M'Sila. Although abandoned and destroyed in the 12th century, the city has been excavated by archeologists and the site is one of the best-preserved sites of a medieval capital city in the Islamic world, with remains of multiple palaces and of a monumental mosque. From the late 11th to early 13th centuries varying extents of Algerian territory were controlled by the Almoravids and Almohads. The Great Mosque of Tlemcen (1082), the Great Mosque of Algiers (1096–1097), and the Great Mosque of Nedroma (1145) are all important foundations from the Almoravid period. After the Almohads, the region was mostly controlled by the Zayyanids (13th to early 16th centuries), based in Tlemcen, with occasional incursions by the Marinids. Both the Zayyanids and the Marinids left a significant architectural legacy in Tlemcen, which became a cultural center of the region. Various mosques and monuments in the western Maghrebi-Andalusi style are still preserved in the city today. After the Ottomans brought the region under their control in the 16th century, Algiers became the new center of power. Many mosques, palaces, and tombs were built in the city with a blend of Ottoman and indigenous Maghrebi architectural influences. An important example is the 17th-century New Mosque, which has an Ottoman-influenced layout with dome and vaulted ceilings alongside a Maghrebi-style minaret.

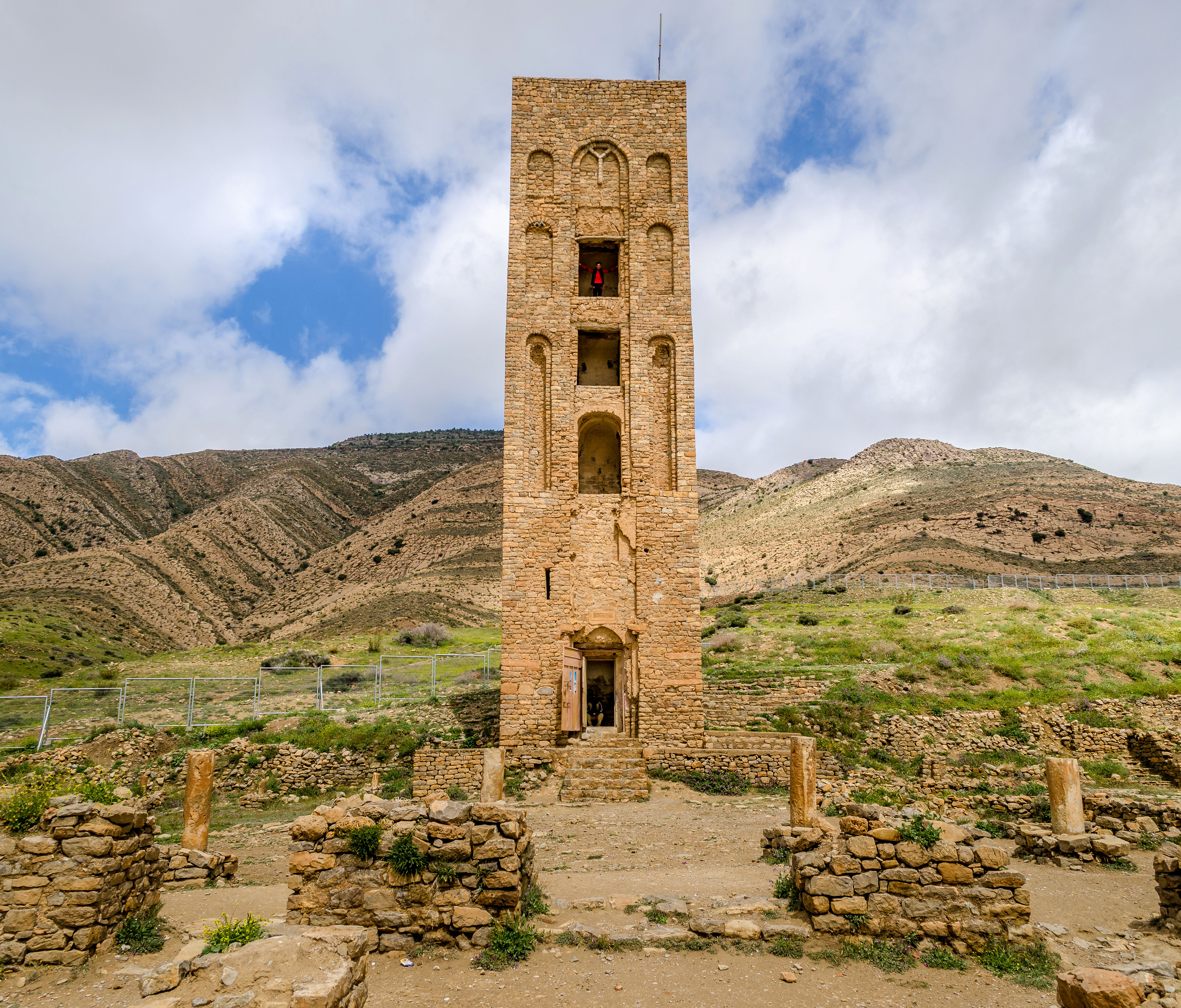
Remains of the mosque of Qal'at Bani Hammad (11th century)

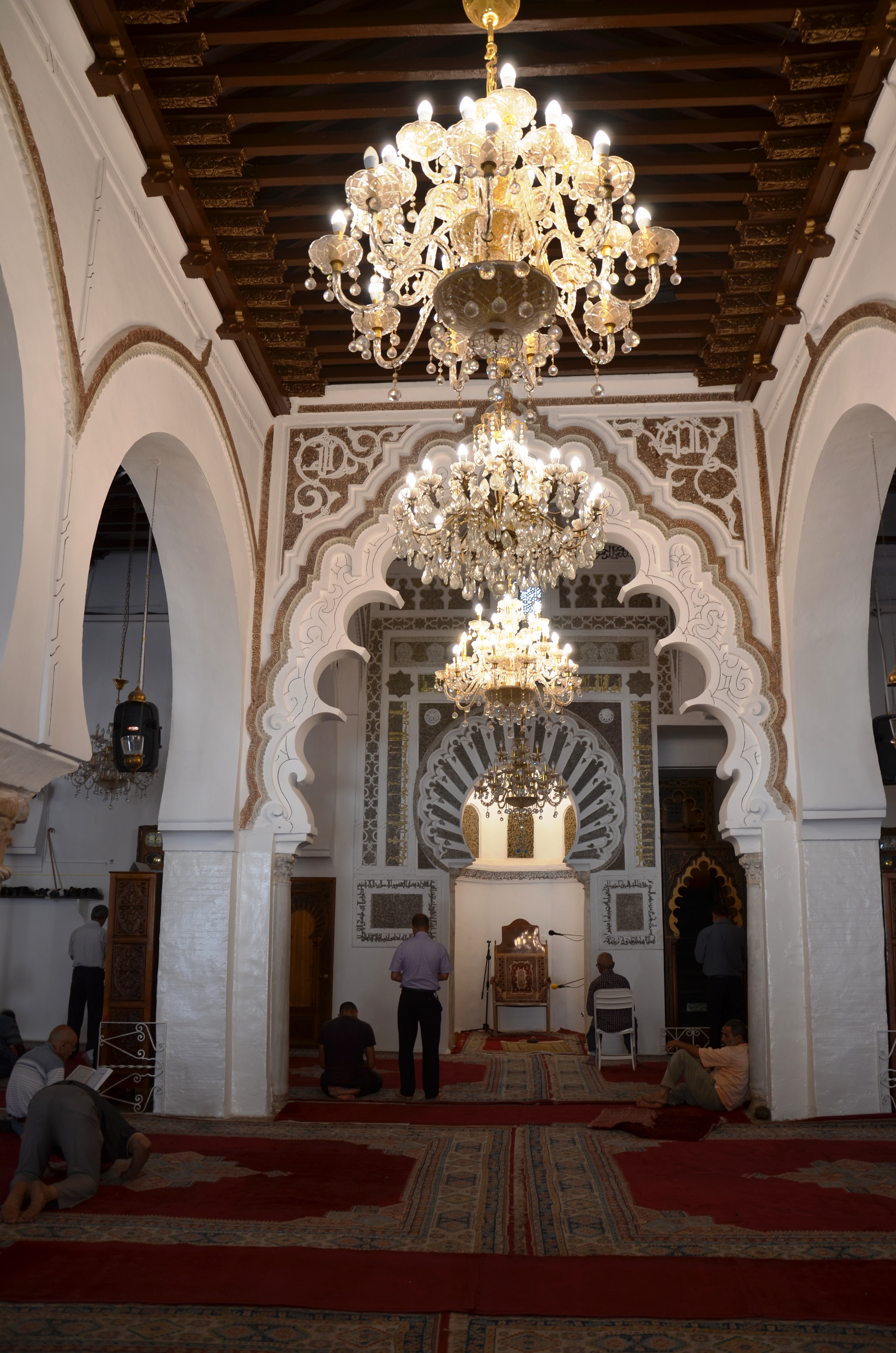
Great Mosque of Tlemcen (11th–12th centuries, with later additions)

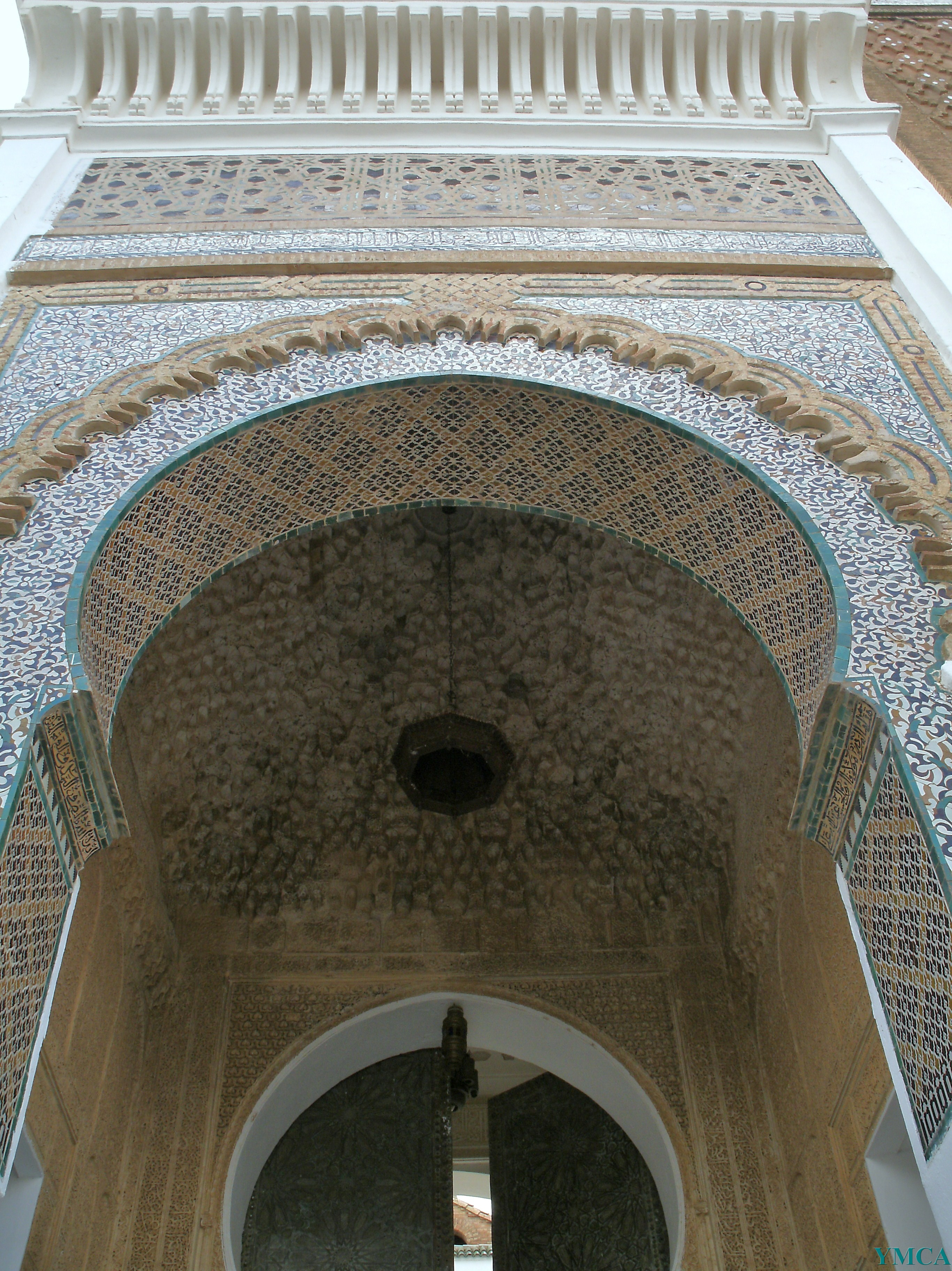
Zellij and muqarnas decoration at the entrance of the Sidi Bu Madyan Mosque in Tlemcen (14th century)

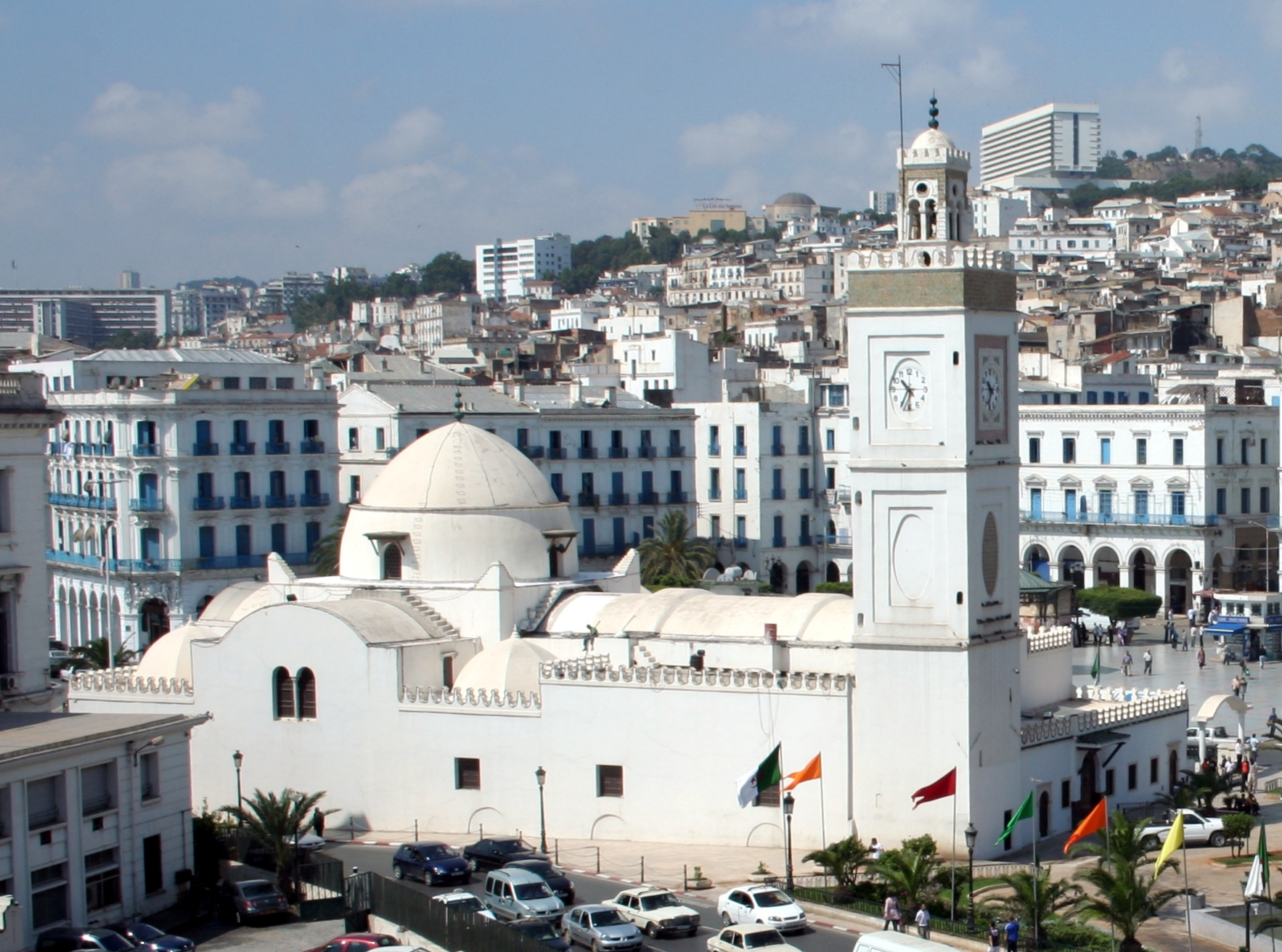
New Mosque in Algiers (17th century)

==== Morocco ====
Islamic architecture began in Morocco under the Idrisid dynasty, with structures such as the University of al-Qarawiyyin, founded in the 9th century. The Almoravid dynasty united northwest Africa and Iberia under one empire, and brought Andalusi architects to North Africa. A similar situation persisted under the Almohads, whose buildings (e.g. the Kutubiyya Mosque) further cemented many stylistic trends that would characterize the architecture of the region. After them, the Marinid dynasty used similar architectural forms with increased surface decoration, which shared many similarities with contemporary Nasrid architecture in the Emirate of Granada. Some features of Moroccan Islamic architecture that emerged from these periods are the riad, square-based minarets, tadelakt plaster, and decorative features such as arabesque and zellij. Under the Saadi dynasty, marble from Carrara, bought with Moroccan sugar, was used in the furnishing of palaces and mosques. The traditional Moorish style of architecture continued to be followed under the 'Alawi dynasty, which ruled Morocco from the 17th century onward. Between 1672 and 1727, The 'Alawi sultan Moulay Isma'il built a new capital at Meknes, the Kasbah of Moulay Ismail, which covered a vast area and featured monuments and infrastructure on a vast scale. The 'Alawi sultans continued to build or renovate other palaces and mosques. Some of the palaces preserved today were built by other high-ranking officials, such as the Bahia Palace in Marrakesh, which was built in the late 19th century by a family of viziers.

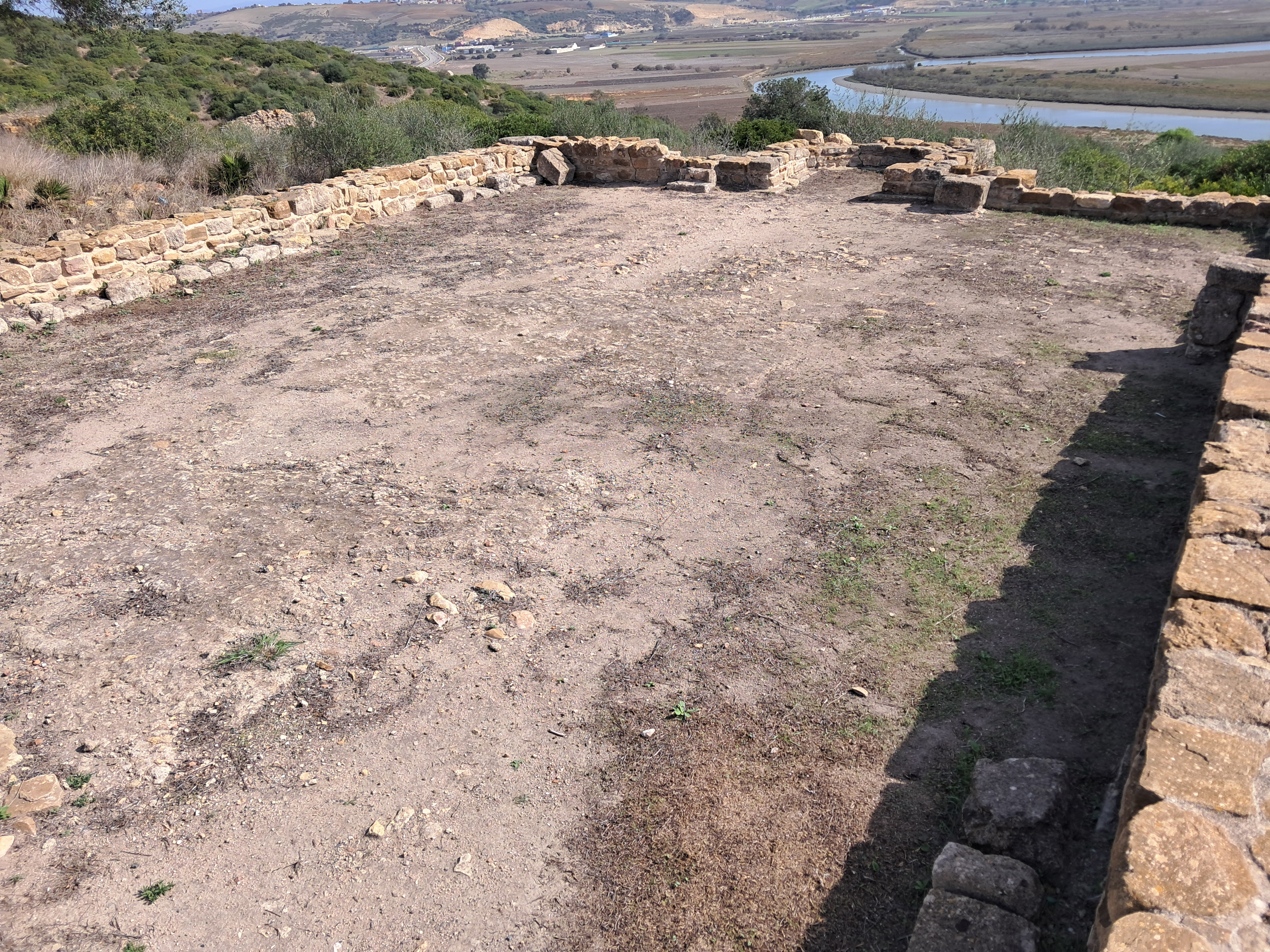
Remains of an Idrisid mosque at Lixus

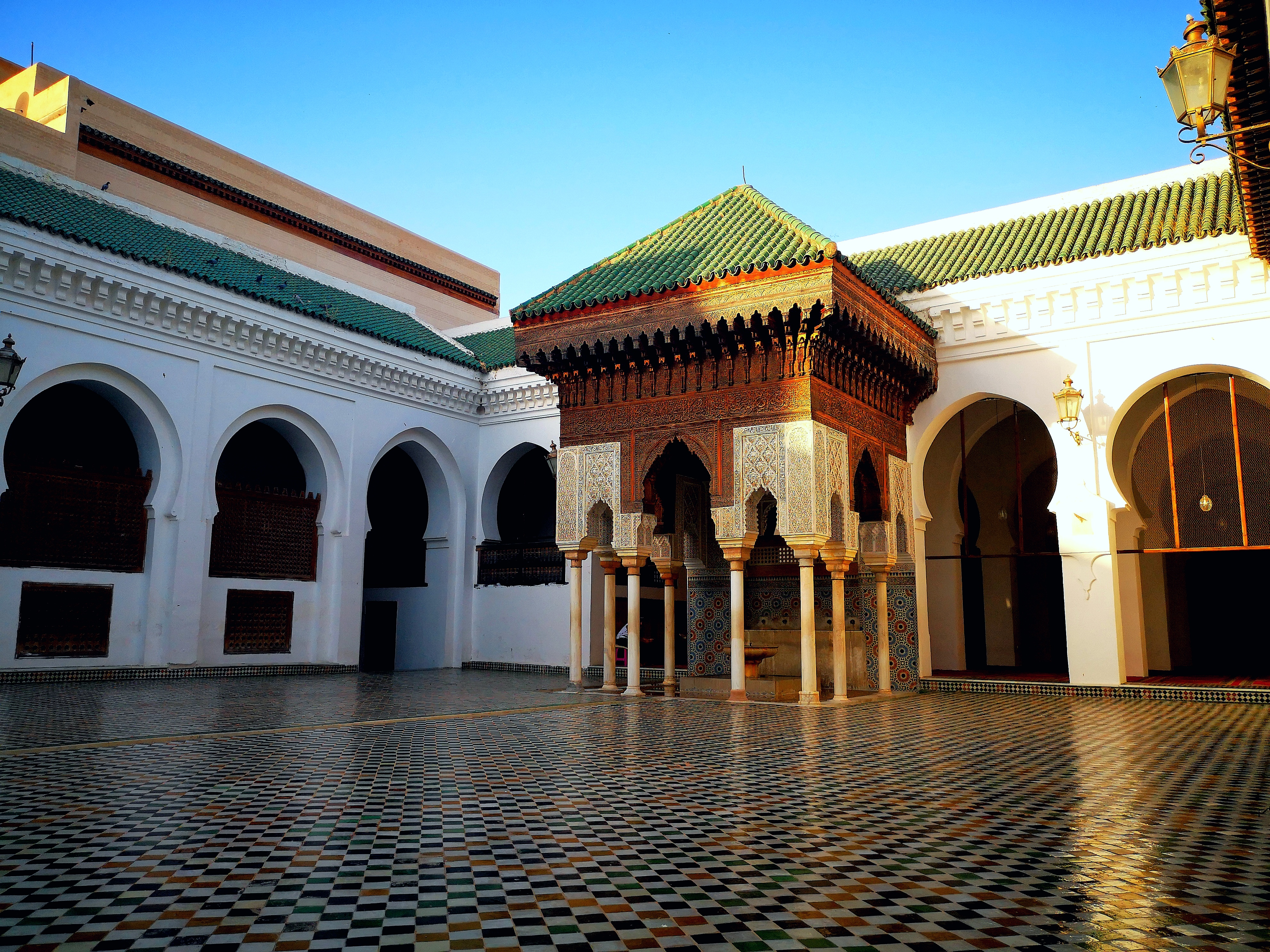
University of al-Qarawiyyin in Fes, founded as a mosque in the 9th century. The central pavilion dates from the 16th–17th century.

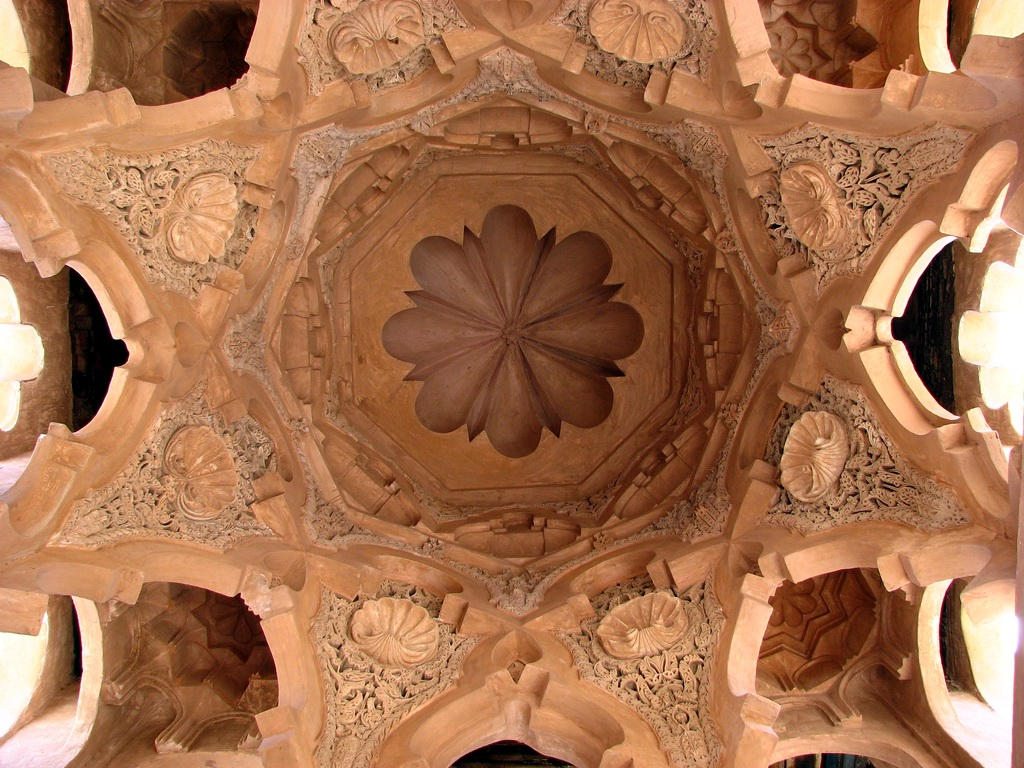
Almoravid Qubba in Marrakesh (early 12th century)

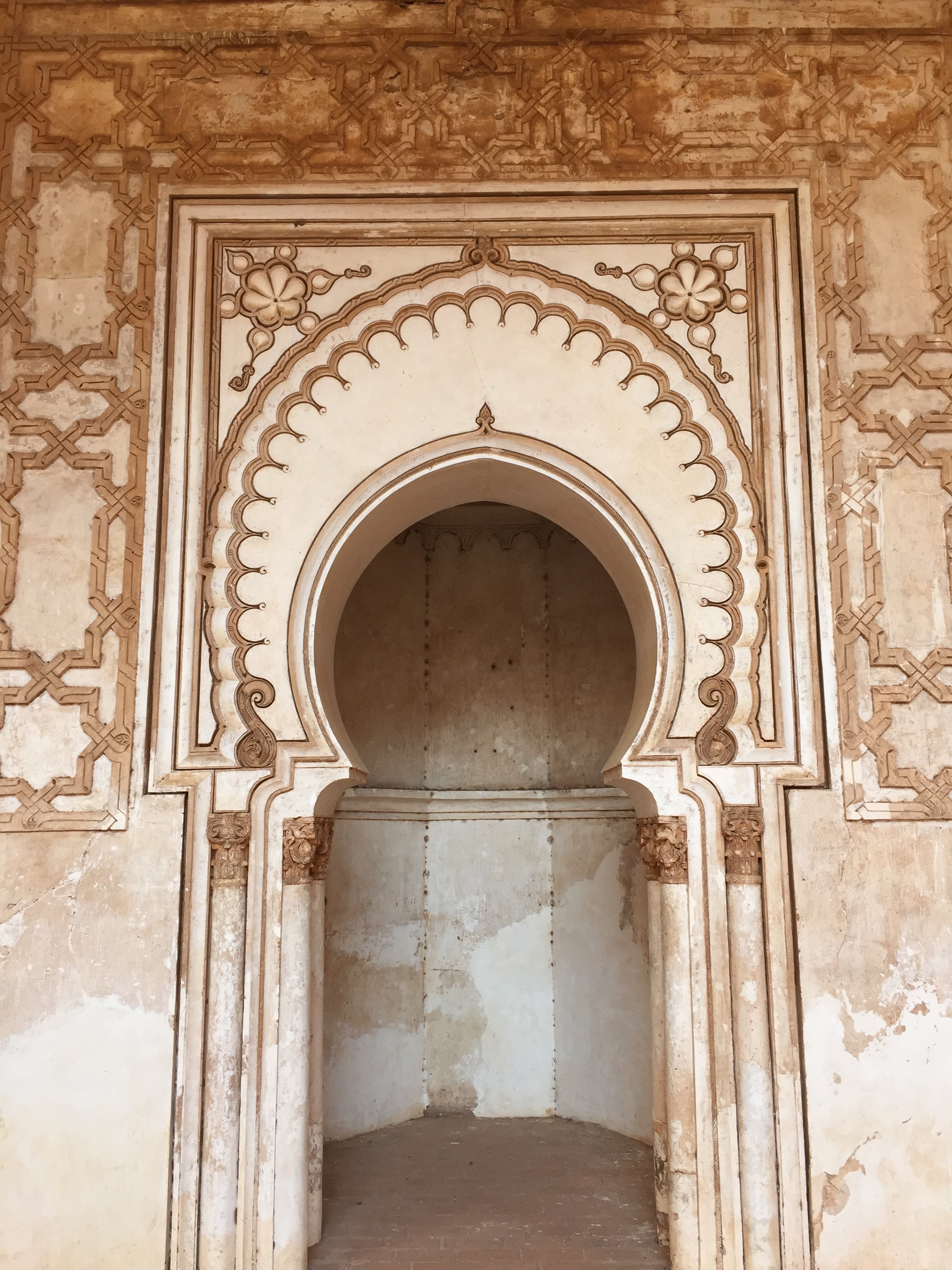
Mihrab of the Almohad Mosque of Tinmel (12th century)

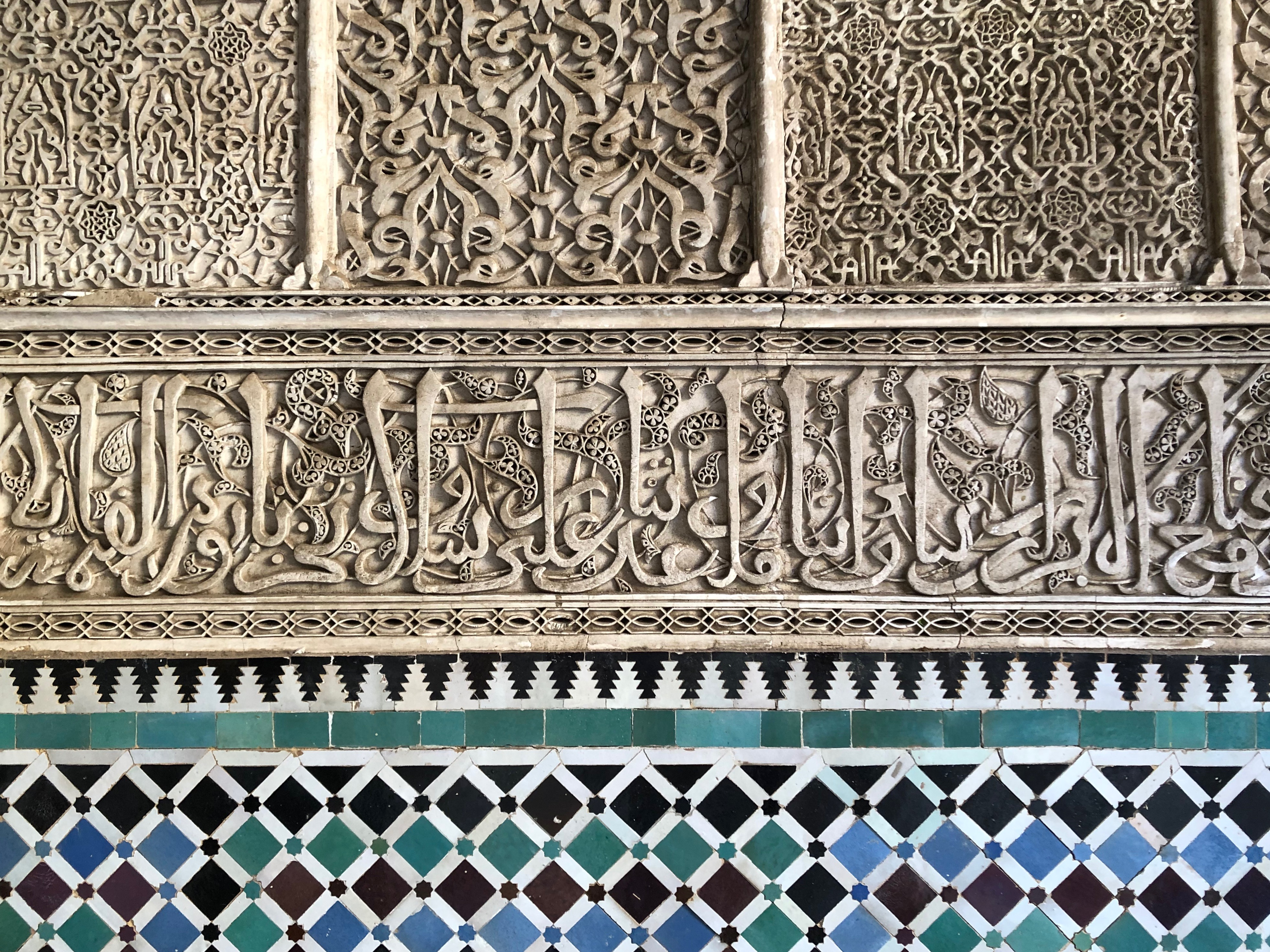
Arabesque, Maghrebi script, and zillīj at Al-Attarine Madrasa in Fes (14th century)

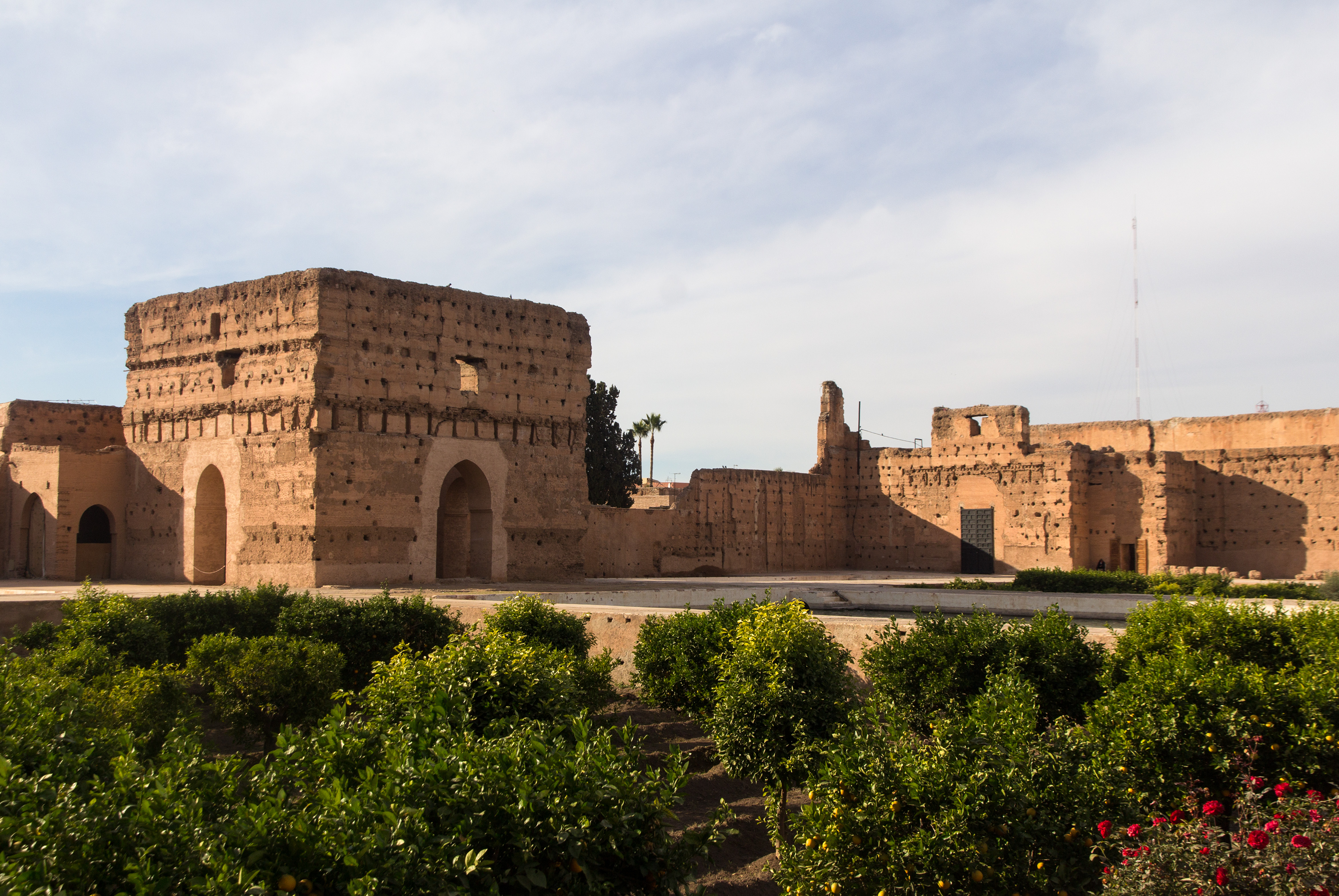
El Badi Palace in Marrakesh (late 16th century)

==== Egypt ====
After initially being a province of the Umayyad and Abbasid Caliphates, with its administrative capital at Fustat, Egypt became more politically independent in the 9th century under the Tulunid dynasty. In the 10th century, the Fatimid Caliphate moved its base of power to Egypt and founded the city of Cairo, near Fustat. Fatimid architecture in Egypt can be witnessed in religious monuments in Cairo such as the Al-Azhar Mosque (significantly modified in later centuries), the Al-Hakim Mosque, and in the small but artistically significant Aqmar Mosque. Other remains from this period include the monumental stone gates of Cairo—Bab al-Futuh, Bab al-Nasr, and Bab Zuweila—which were built by a Fatimid vizier in the 11th century. The Great Fatimid Palaces, where the caliphs lived, have not been preserved. After the Fatimids, Egypt became the capital of the Ayyubid dynasty founded by Salah ad-Din (Saladin). The most significant monument of this era was the Citadel of Cairo, which became Egypt's center of government up until the 19th century. In the mid-13th century the Mamluks took control and ruled an empire from Cairo that lasted until the Ottoman conquest of 1517. The Mamluks were major patrons of architecture and a large part of the historic heritage of Islamic Cairo dates from their time. The major monuments of Mamluk architecture were multi-functional religious and funerary complexes whose layouts were adapted to fit into the dense urban environment. Some of the most significant examples of this period include the Complex of Sultan Qalawun, the Madrasa-Mosque of Sultan Hasan, and the Funerary complex of Sultan Qaytbay.

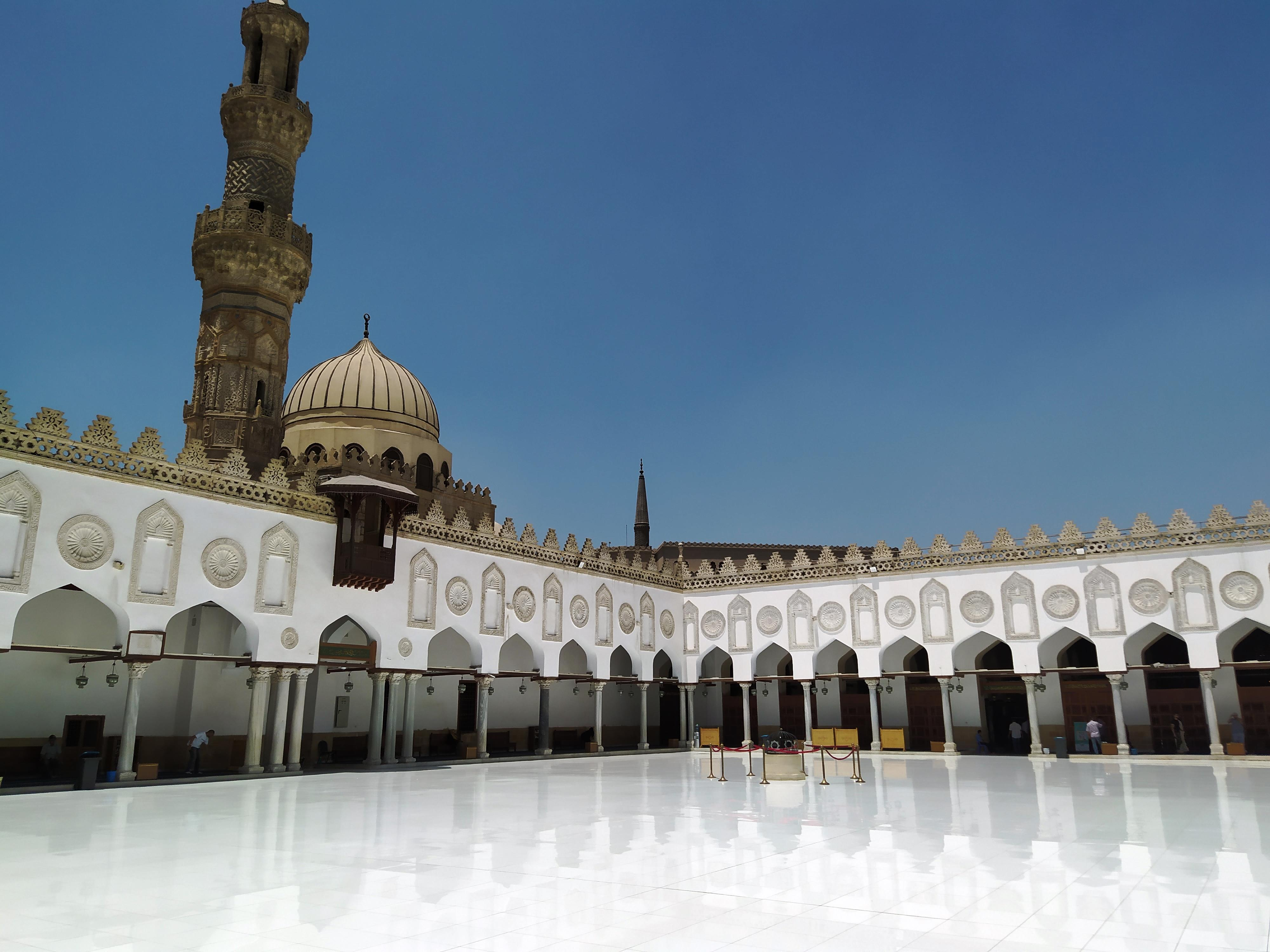
Courtyard of the Al-Azhar Mosque in Cairo, founded in 972

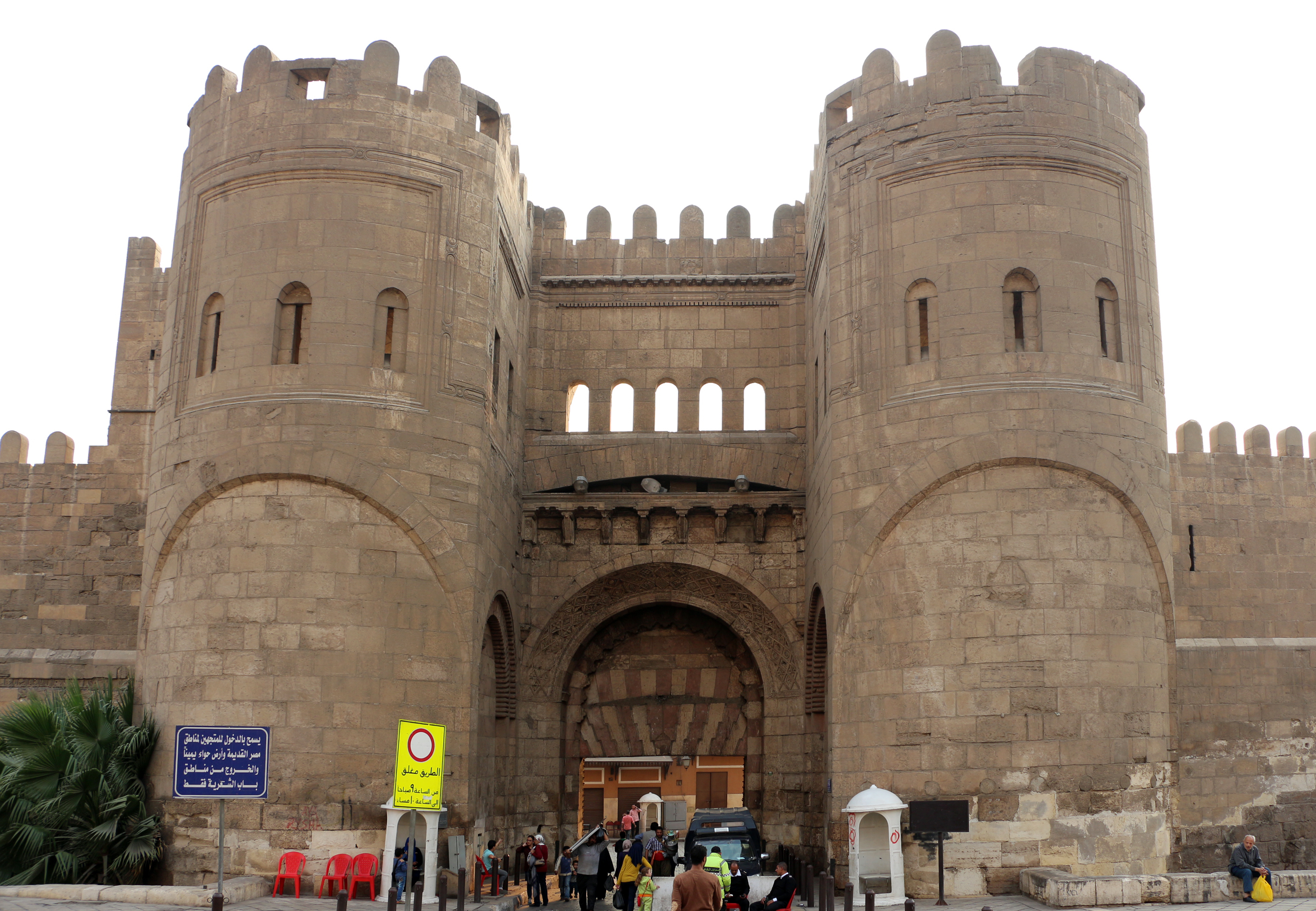
Bab al-Futuh, a Fatimid gate in Cairo (1087–92)

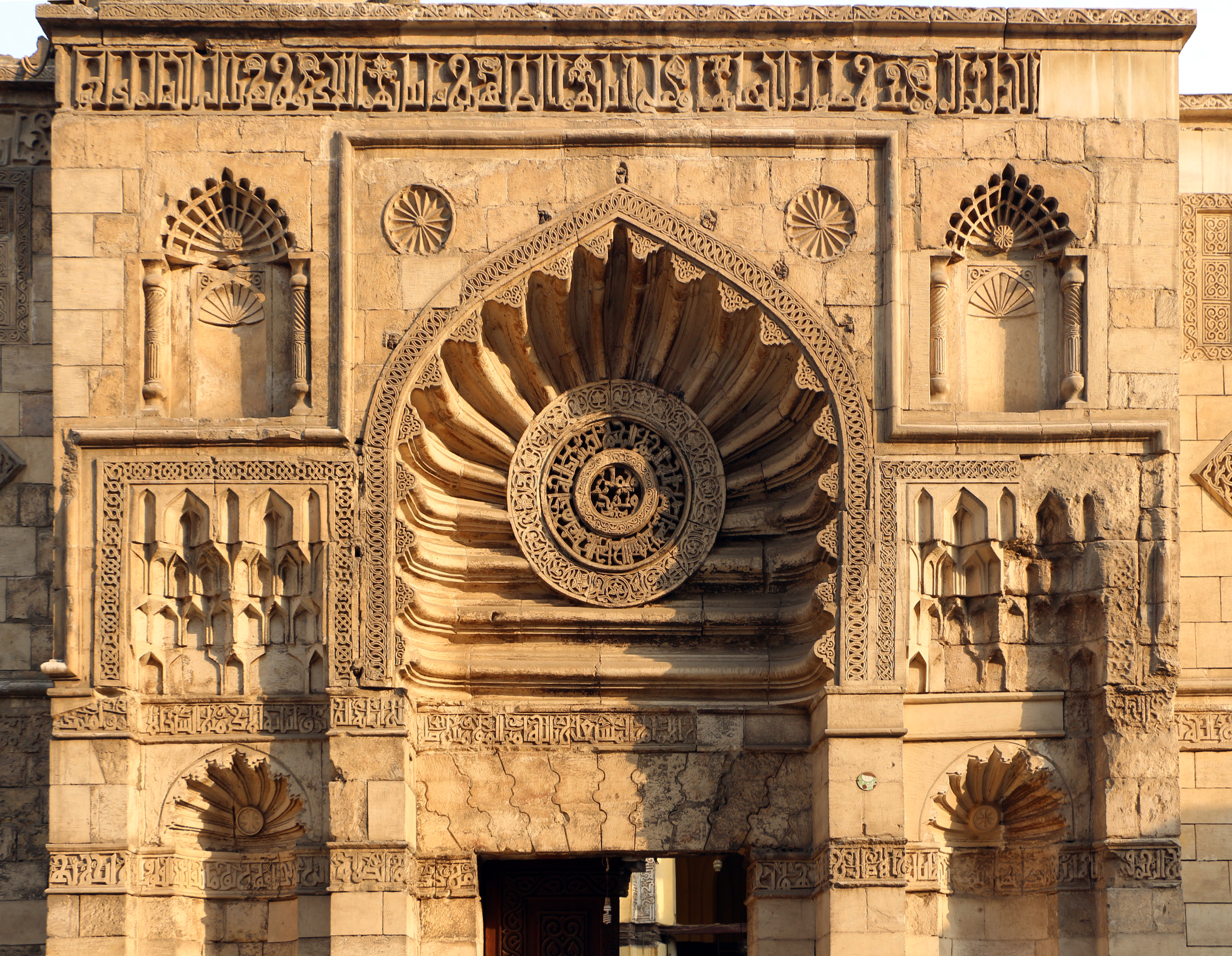
Street façade of the Aqmar Mosque (1126)

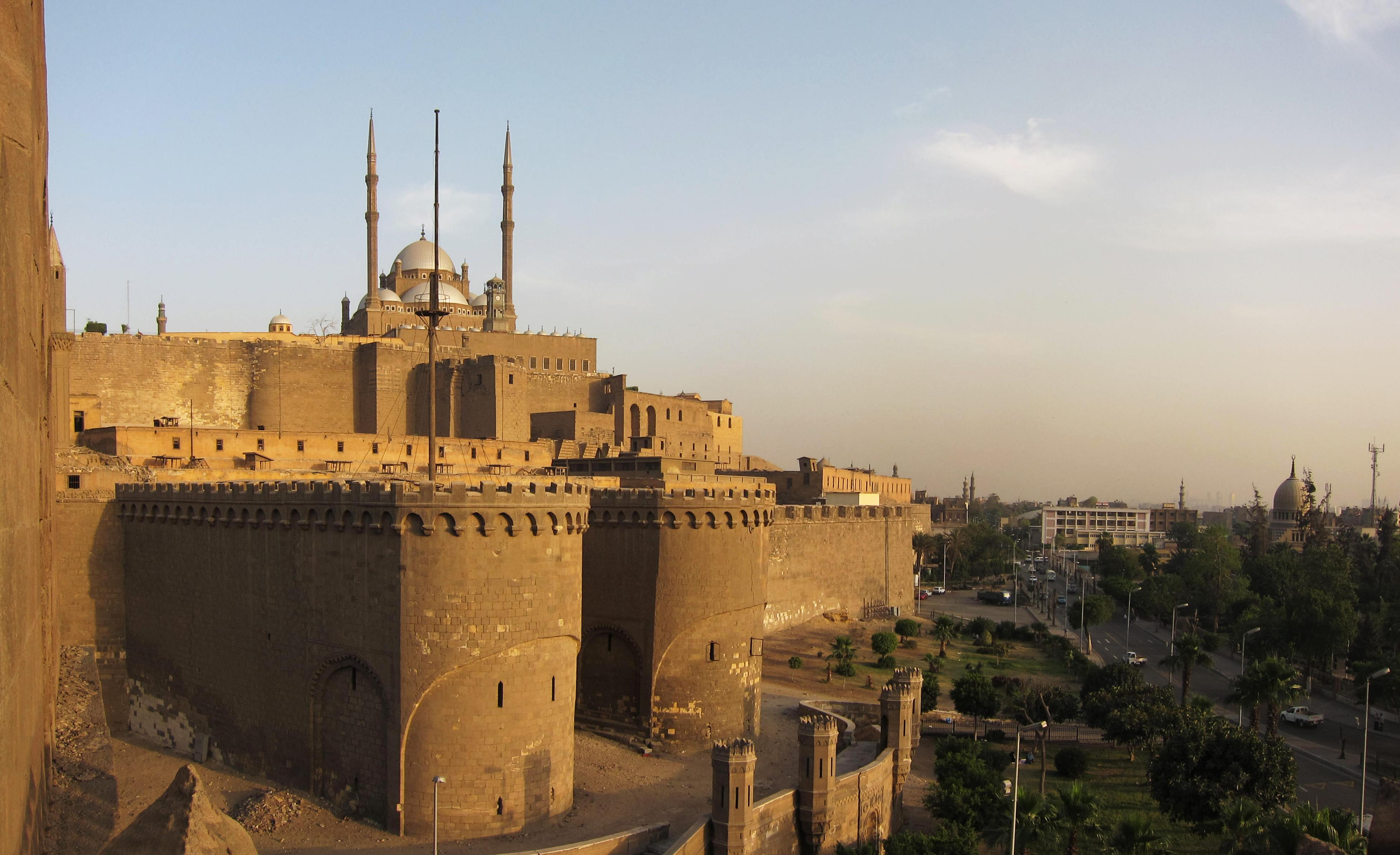
The Citadel of Cairo, founded in 1176

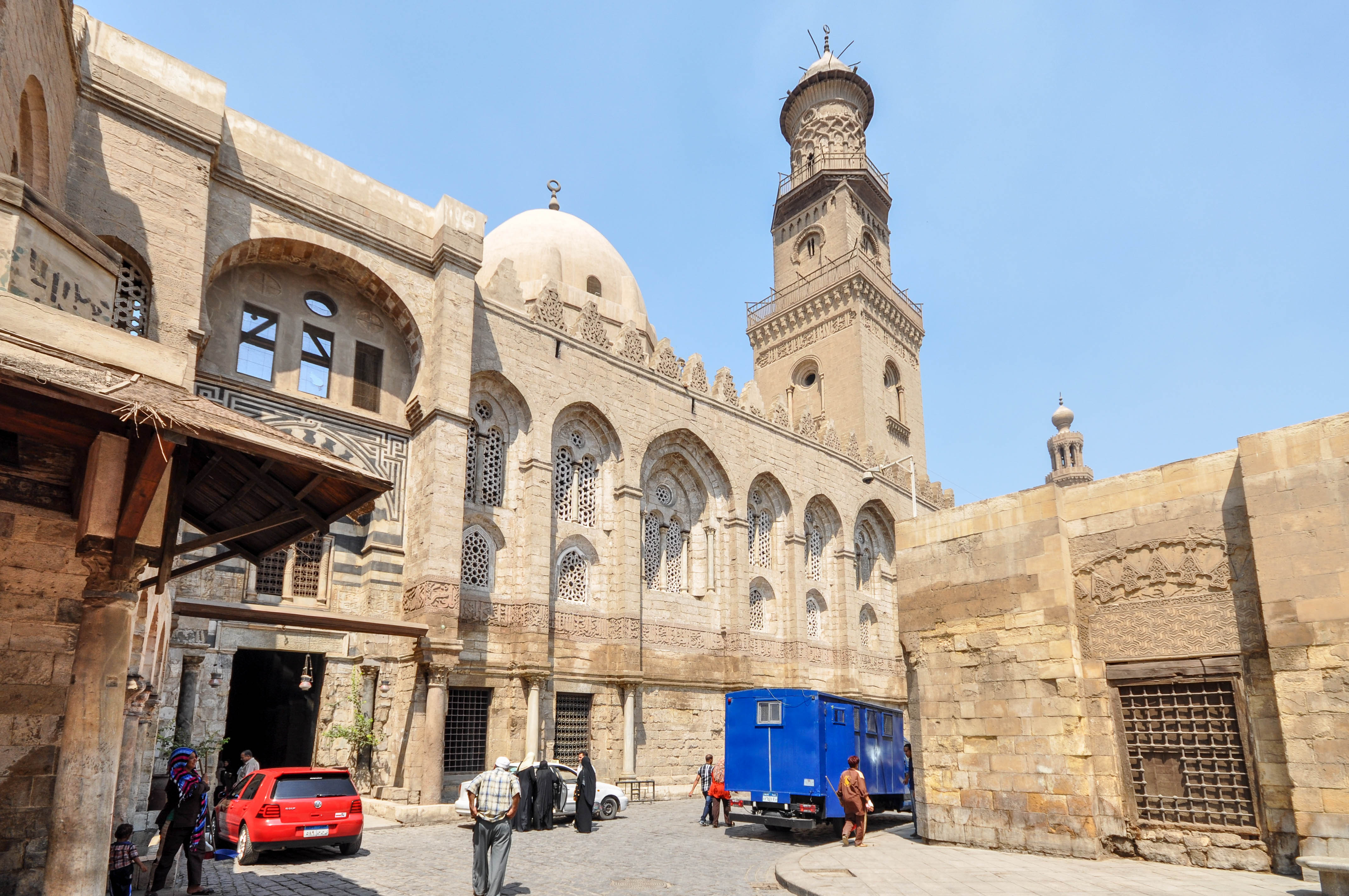
Exterior of the Funerary complex of Sultan Qalawun (1285), which included a mausoleum, a madrasa, and a maristan

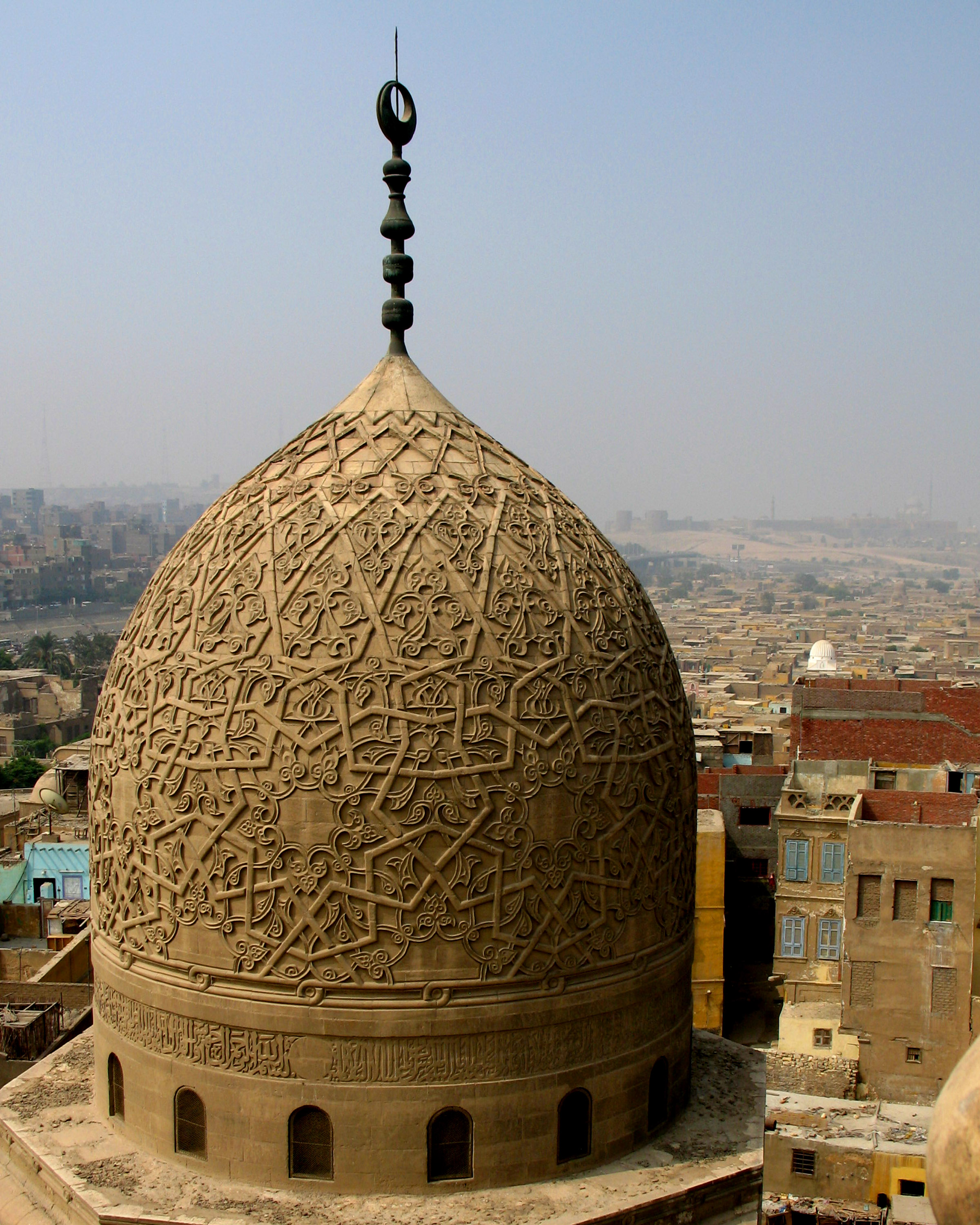
Dome of the Funerary complex of Sultan Qaytbay (1474)

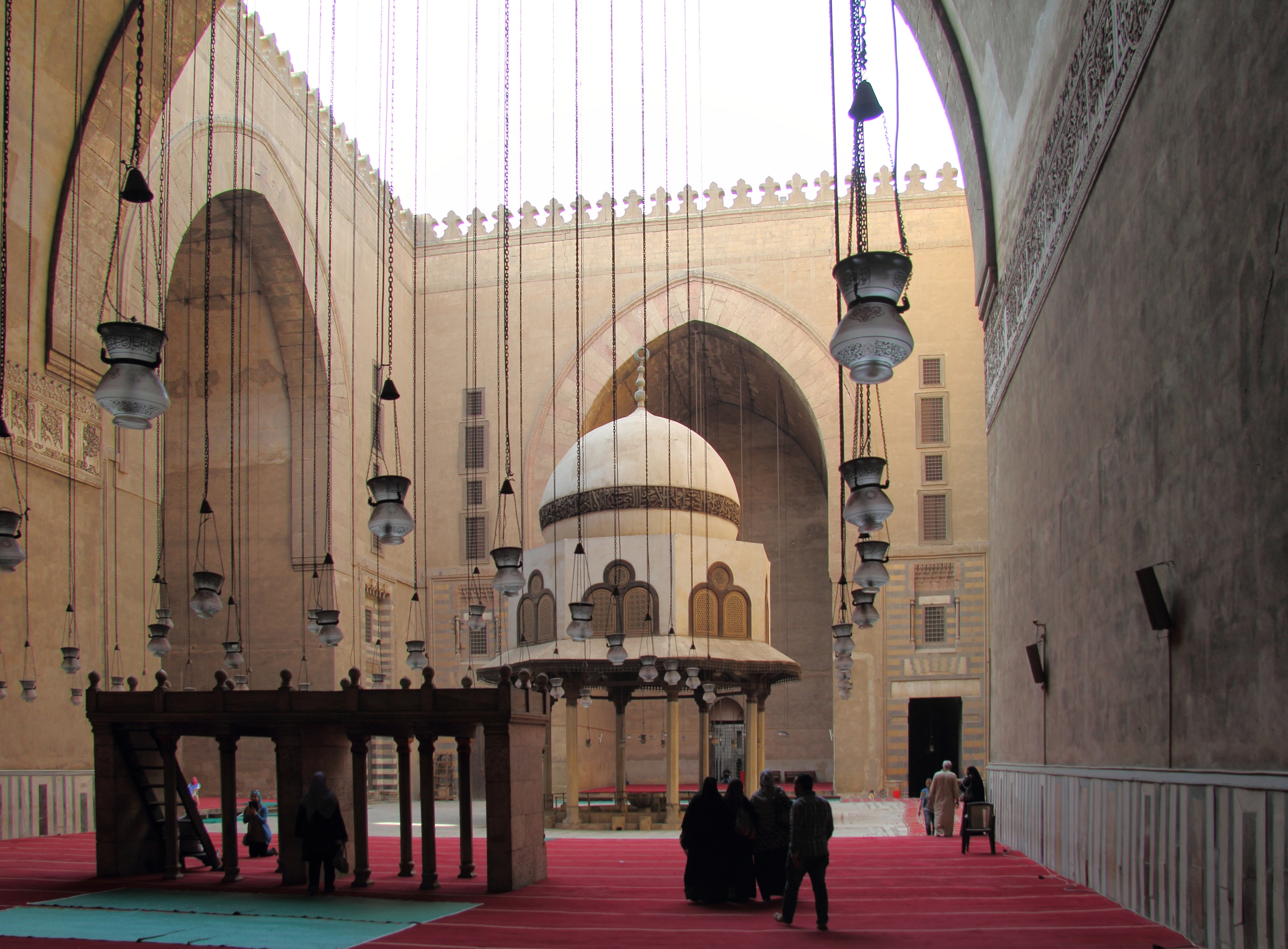
Madrasa-Mosque of Sultan Hasan (1356–1361)

==== Sudan ====
===== Nubia =====
The Christianization of Nubia began in the 6th century. Its most representative architecture consists of churches, whose design is based on Byzantine basilicas, but which are relatively small and made of mud bricks. Vernacular architecture of the Christian period is scarce. Soba is the only city that has been excavated. Its structures are made of sun-dried bricks, the same as today, except for an arch. During the Fatimid phase of Islam, Nubia became Arabized. Its most import mosque was the Mosque of Derr.

=== West Africa ===
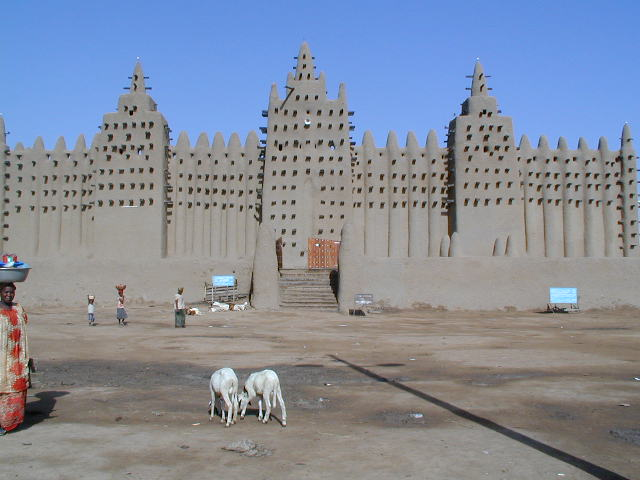
The Great Mosque of Djenné in Mali, first built in the 13th century and reconstructed in 1906–1909, is the largest clay building in the world.

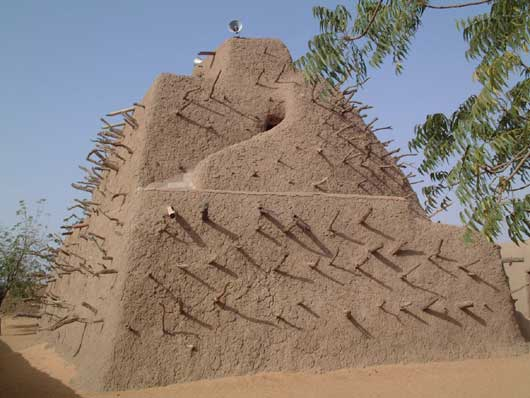
Tomb of Askia in Gao, Mali

At Kumbi Saleh, locals lived in dome-shaped dwellings in the king's section of the city, surrounded by a great enclosure. Traders lived in stone houses in a section which possessed 12 beautiful mosques (as described by al-Bakri), one of which was for Friday prayer. The king is said to have owned several mansions, one of which was sixty-six feet long and forty-two feet wide, contained seven rooms, was two stories high, and had a staircase, with paintings on the walls and chambers filled with sculpture.

Sahelian architecture initially grew from the two cities of Djenné and Timbuktu. The Sankore Mosque, constructed from mud on timber, was similar in style to the Great Mosque of Djenné.

==== Ghana ====
===== Ashanti =====
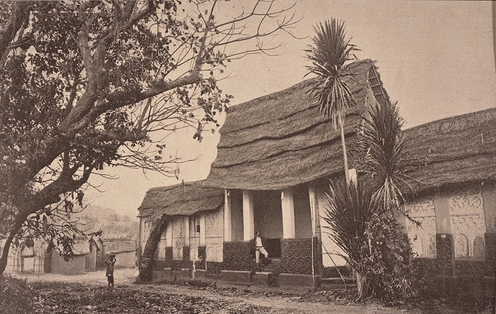
Palace of, Ashanti, King Kwaku Dua of Kumasi, 1887

Ashanti architecture from Ghana is perhaps best known from the reconstruction at Kumasi, Ghana. Its key features are courtyard-based buildings, and walls with striking reliefs in brightly painted mud plaster. An example is the Besease shrine, which can be seen at Kumasi. Four rectangular rooms, constructed from wattle and daub, lie around a courtyard. Animal designs mark the walls, and palm leaves cut to a tiered shape provide the roof.

==== Mali ====
At Tondidarou, in the Malian Lakes Region, there are megaliths of an anthropomorphic nature (e.g., face, navel, scarifications) that date between 600 CE and 700 CE.

At the Inner Niger Delta, in the Mali Lakes Region, there are two monumental tumuli constructed in the time period of the Trans-Saharan trade for the Sahelian kingdoms of West Africa. The El Oualadji monumental tumulus, which dates between 1030 CE and 1220 CE and has two human remains buried with horse remains and various items (e.g., horse harnesses, horse trappings with plaques and bells, bracelets, rings, beads, iron items), may have been, as highlighted by al-Bakri, the royal burial site of a king from the Ghana Empire. The Koï Gourrey monumental tumulus, which may date prior to 1326 CE and has over twenty human remains that were buried with various items (e.g., iron accessories, an abundant amount of copper bracelets, anklets and beads, an abundant amount of broken, but whole pottery, another set of distinct, intact, glazed pottery, a wooden-beaded bone necklace, a bird figurine, a lizard figurine, a crocodile figurine), and is situated within the Mali Empire.

==== Nigeria ====
Several societies in pre-colonial Nigeria built structures from earth and stone. In general, these structures were primarily defensive, repelling invaders from other tribes, but many settlements put spiritual elements into their construction. These defensive structures were primarily constructed from earth, occasionally plastered.

Dump ramparts consist of an outer ditch and inner bank and can span from 1/2 meter to 20 meters across in the largest settlements such as Benin and Sungbo's Eredo. Coursed mud walls in the Guinea and Sudan savannas were laid in layers of mud. Each layer of mud would be held in place by wooden framing, allowed to dry, and built on top of. At the most significant settlement in Koso, these walls averaged 6 meters in height, tapering from 2 meters thick at the base to 1/2 meter thick at the top. Tubali walls in northern Nigeria have two components: sun-dried mud bricks held together with mud mortar. Walls in this style have a tendency to deteriorate in wetter climates.

These mud constructions were usually plastered with mud mixed with other materials. The defensive purpose of this was to create a smoother, unscalable surface to help repel attackers. However, some plaster has been found with blood, bone remains, gold dust, oil, and straw mixed in. Some of these materials were functional, adding strength, while others had spiritual meanings, possibly to defend against evil spirits.

Benin City in particular had sophisticated house and urban planning. Houses had several rooms and were usually roofed, enclosing private quarters, sacred spaces, and rooms for receiving guests. Usually, multiple houses would enclose a shared courtyard. When it rained, the house roofs would collect water into a space in the courtyard for later use. Houses would have public frontage along long, straight roads. The city had markets and the chief's palace in the center of the city, with dominant and subordinate roads leading outwards. HM Stanely, quoted in Asomani-Boateng, Raymond (2011-11-01), described the roads as "...fenced with tall [water cane] neatly set very close together in uniform rows..." possibly for privacy.

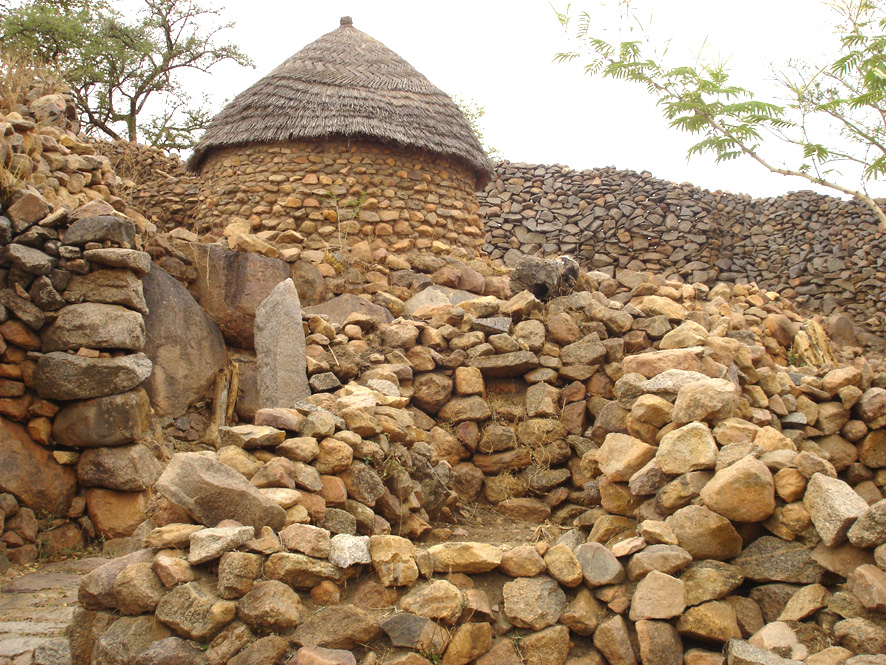
Dry-laid stone structure in Sukur, in the Adamawa State

More sophisticated construction methods include stone and brick constructions, with and without mortar, plaster, and accompanying defensive structures. Fired brick constructions were observed in settlements in northeast Nigeria, such as historic Kanuri buildings. Many of the bricks have since been removed for new constructions. Laterite block walls with clay mortar were found in northwest Nigeria, possibly inspired by Songhai constructions. Walls built from stone without mortar have been found where societies could obtain sufficient stone, most notably in Sukur. None of these constructions have been observed with additional plastering.

The Sukur World Heritage Site is especially significant, with extensive terraces, walls, and infrastructure. Walls separate homes, animal pens, and granaries, while terraces often include spiritual items such as sacred trees or ceramic shrines. Early iron foundries were also present, usually placed close to the homes of their owners.

Broadly, three styles of residential architecture can be identified in indigenous Nigerian architecture, relating to the people groups which developed them.

- Hausa architecture uses plastered adobe to create monolithic walls. Roofing is provided by shallow domes and vaults made from structural timber beams covered by laterite and earth. Homesteads are bounded by perimeter walls with both circular and linear interior divisions with one clearly defined entrance. Hausa architecture was inspired by Islam; Hausa buildings were divided by gender (men have their own building while women have their own building).
- Yoruba architecture uses cured earth walls to support roof timbers, over which leaf or woven grass roofing is applied. These walls are usually homogeneous mud structures, though wattle-and-daub techniques can be found in certain locations. Space is divided into individual units which are then connected by proximity and walls into a compound with courtyards and private spaces. Multiple entrances and exits allow access to accessory facilities such as kitchens.
- Igbo architecture uses similar construction techniques and materials as Yoruba architecture, but varies significantly in spatial arrangement. No unified compound walls exist in these constructions. Instead, individual units are related to a central leader's hut, with significance attached to relative position and size.

These elements are believed to affect present-day residential house design, especially when designating spaces as public, semi-public, semi-private, or private.

==== Vernacular Architecture ====
One style of vernacular architecture, known as Tabali in Hausa, is produced in Northern Nigeria and is known for its use of vibrant and colorful embellishments and wall painting. This style of vernacular architecture uses mud, reeds, stones, and timber to create walls, columns, doors, and windows.

===== Benin City =====
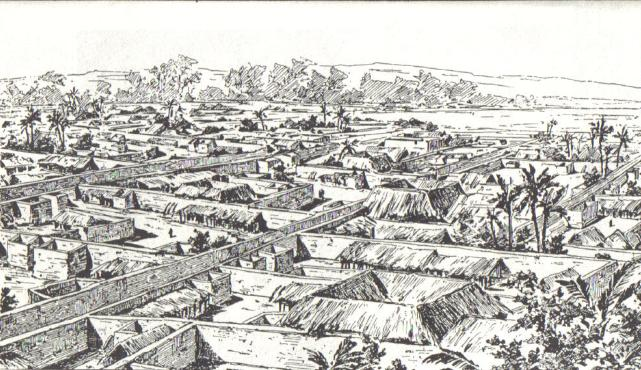
Drawing of Benin City made by an English officer in 1897

The rise of kingdoms in the West African coastal region produced architecture which drew on indigenous traditions, utilizing wood. Benin City in Nigeria was destroyed during the Benin Expedition of 1897. Known as a large complex of homes in coursed mud, with hipped roofs of shingles or palm leaves. The palace contained a sequence of ceremonial rooms and was decorated with brass plaques. The Walls of Benin City were the world's largest man-made structure. Fred Pearce wrote in New Scientist:

They extend for some 16,000 kilometres in all, in a mosaic of more than 500 interconnected settlement boundaries. They cover 6500 square kilometres and were all dug by the Edo people. In all, they are four times longer than the Great Wall of China, and consumed a hundred times more material than the Great Pyramid of Cheops. They took an estimated 150 million hours of digging to construct, and are perhaps the largest single archaeological phenomenon on the planet.

In 1691, the Portuguese Lourenco Pinto observed: "Great Benin, where the king resides, is larger than Lisbon; all the streets run straight and as far as the eye can see. The houses are large, especially that of the king, which is richly decorated and has fine columns. The city is wealthy and industrious. It is so well governed that theft is unknown and the people live in such security that they have no doors to their houses."

Benin City's planning and design was done according to careful rules of symmetry, proportionality and repetition now known as fractal design. The main streets had underground drainage made of a sunken impluvium with an outlet to carry away storm water. Many narrower side and intersecting streets extended off them.

===== Hausa Kingdoms =====
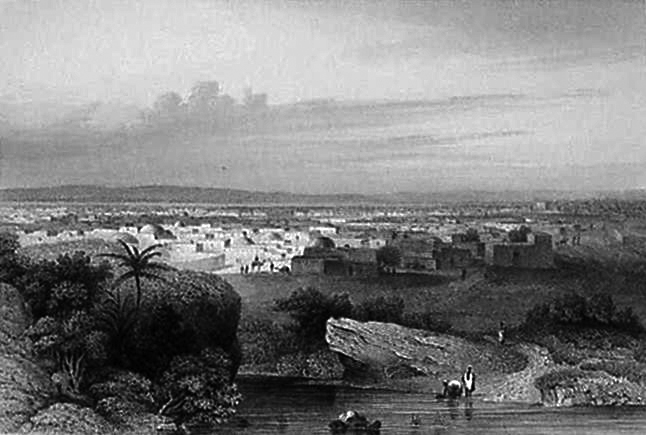
The city of Kano

The important Hausa Kingdoms city state of Kano was surrounded by a wall of reinforced ramparts of stone and bricks. Kano contained a citadel near which the royal court resided. Individual residences were separated by earthen walls. The higher the status of the resident the more elaborate the wall. The entrance-way was maze-like to keep women secluded. Inside, near the entrance, were the abodes of unmarried women. Further on were slave quarters.

====== Gobarau Mosque ======
Gobarau Mosque is believed to have been completed during the reign of Muhammadu Korau (1398–1408), the first Muslim king of Katsina. Originally built as the central mosque of Katsina town, it was later also used as a school. By the beginning of the 16th century, Katsina had become a very important commercial and academic center in Hausaland, and Gobarau Mosque had grown into a famed Islamic institution of higher learning. Gobarau continued to be Katsina's central mosque until the beginning of the 19th century AD.

===== Yoruba =====
The Yoruba surrounded their settlements with massive mud walls. Their buildings had a similar plan to the Ashanti shrines, but with verandahs around the court. The walls were of puddled mud and palm oil. The most famous of the Yoruba fortifications, and the second largest wall edifice in Africa, is Sungbo's Eredo, a structure that was built in honour of a traditional oloye by the name of Bilikisu Sungbo, in the 9th, 10th and 11th centuries. The structure is made up of sprawling mud walls among the valleys that surrounded the town of Ijebu-Ode in Ogun State. Sungbo's Eredo is the largest pre-colonial monument in Africa, larger than the Great Pyramids or Great Zimbabwe.

=== Eastern Africa ===
==== Burundi ====
Burundi never had a fixed capital. The closest thing to it was a royal hill. When the king moved, his new location became the insago. The compound itself was enclosed inside a high fence and had two entrances. One was for herders and herds. The other was to the royal palace, which was itself surrounded by a fence. The royal palace had three royal courtyards, each serving a particular function: one for herders, one as a sanctuary, and one encompassed by kitchen and granary.

==== Ethiopia ====
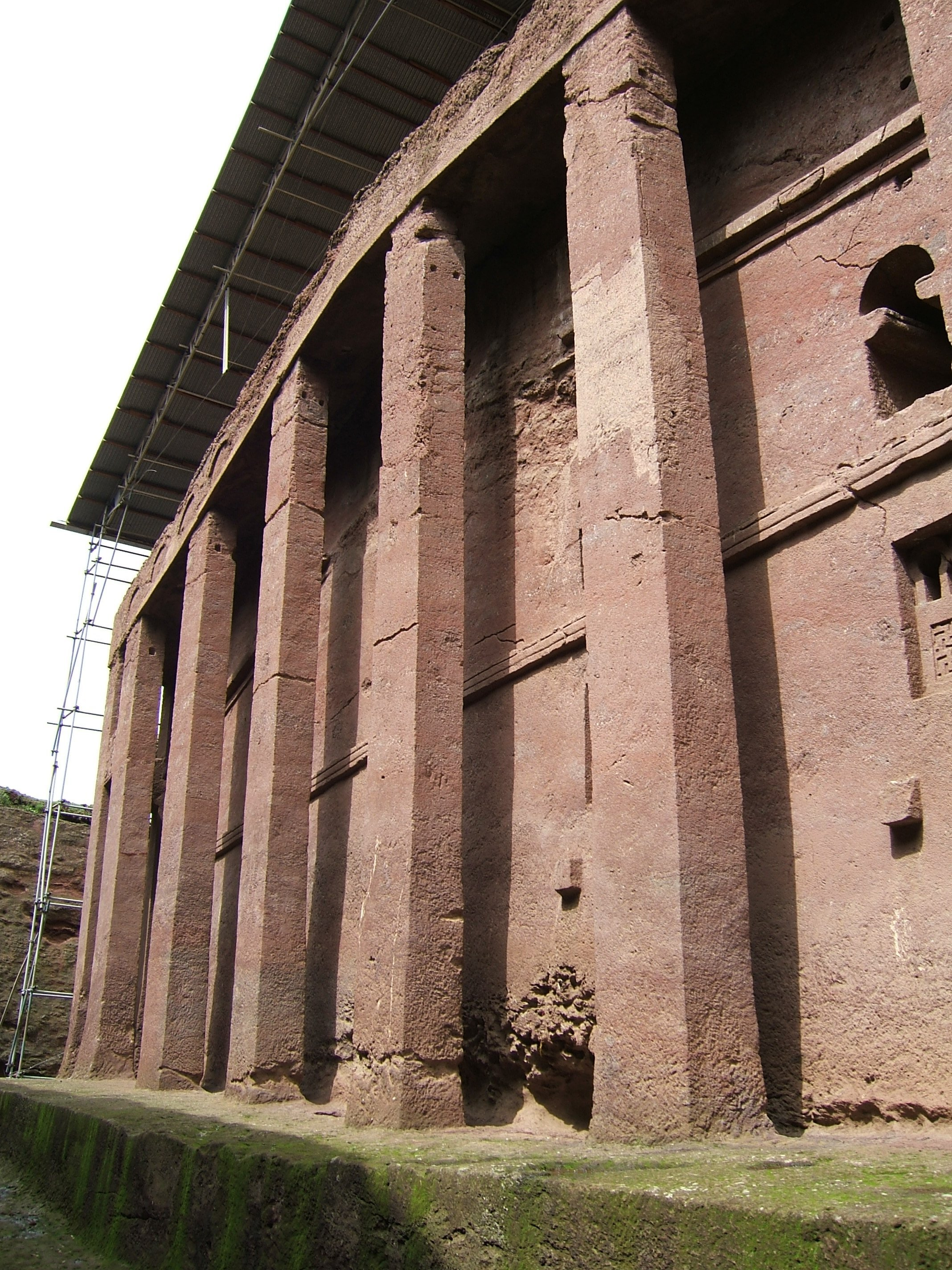
Bete Medhane Alem, Lalibela, the largest monolithic church in the world

Throughout the medieval period, the monolithic influences of Aksumite architecture persisted, with its influence felt strongest in the early medieval (Late Aksumite) and Zagwe periods (when the churches of Lalibela were carved). Throughout the medieval period, and especially during the 10th to 12th centuries, churches were hewn out of rock throughout Ethiopia, especially in the northernmost region of Tigray, which was the heart of the Aksumite Empire. However, rock-hewn churches have been found as far south as Adadi Maryam (15th century), about 100 kilometres (62 mi) south of Addis Ababa.

The most famous examples of Ethiopian rock-hewn architecture are the 11 monolithic churches of Lalibela, carved out of the red volcanic tuff found around the town. Although later medieval hagiographies attribute all 11 structures to the eponymous king Lalibela (the town was called Roha and Adefa before his reign), new evidence indicates that they may have been built separately over a period of a few centuries, with only a few of the more recent churches having been built under his reign. Archaeologist and Ethiopisant David Phillipson postulates that Bete Gebriel-Rufa'el was actually built in the very early medieval period, some time between 600 and 800 AD, originally as a fortress but later turned into a church.

==== Kenya ====
Thimlich Ohinga is a complex of dry-stone walled enclosures near Migori town in Western Kenya. Thimlich Ohinga was built around the 16th century CE by sedentary, pastoralist Bantus who later on abandoned the site, later on replaced by members of the Luo people. The site consists of four main "Ohingni" (i.e. settlements) surrounded by walls with low entrances, the walls were built by stacking irregularly-shaped stones without the use of any mortar, the result being an interlocked wall with immense stability similar to walls of Great Zimbabwe 3600 kilometers to the south of the settlement. The walls of Thimlich Ohinga also included vents for water drainage, buttresses to reinforce the free-standing walls and a watchtower.Within the walls of the settlement were livestock enclosures, houses and granaries. The inhabitants of Thimlich Ohinga engaged in craft industries, most notably pottery and metallurgy. Imported glass beads at the site indicate that Thimlich Ohinga was part of a network of long-distance trade.

==== Rwanda ====
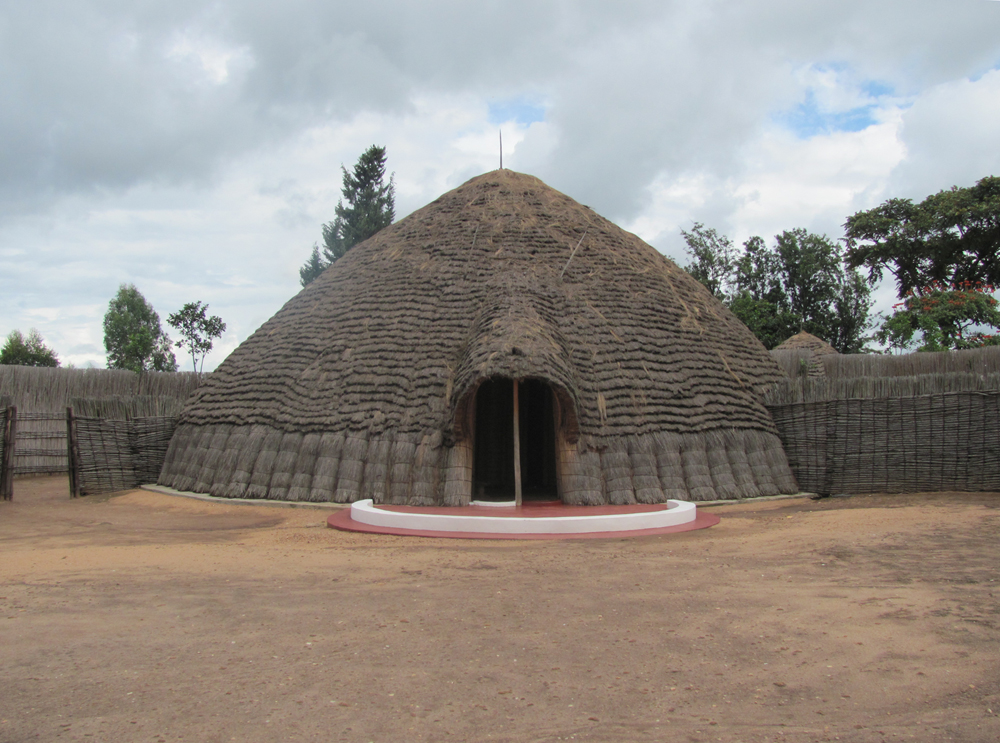
King's palace in Nyanza, Rwanda

Nyanza was the royal capital of Rwanda. The king's residence, the Ibwami, was built on a hill. Surrounding hills were occupied by permanent or temporary dwellings. These dwellings were round huts surrounded by big yards and tall hedges to separate the compounds. The Rugo, the royal compound, was encircled by reed fences encompassing thatched houses. The houses for the king's entourage were carpeted with mats and had clay hearths in the center. For the king and his wife, the royal house was close to 200–100 yards in length and looked like a huge maze of connected huts and granaries. It had one entrance that lead to a large public square called the karubanda.

==== Somalia ====
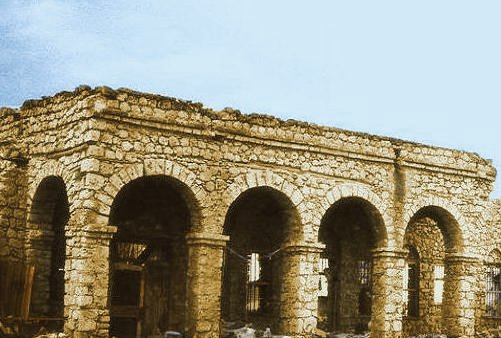
Ruins of the dry Sultanate of Adal in Zeila, Somalia

Somali architecture has a rich and diverse tradition of designing and engineering different types of construction, such as masonry, castles, citadels, fortresses, mosques, temples, aqueducts, lighthouses, towers and tombs, during the ancient, medieval, and early modern periods in Somalia. It also encompasses the fusion of Somalo-Islamic architecture with Western designs in modern times.

In ancient Somalia, pyramidical structures known in Somali as taalo were a popular burial style, with hundreds of these dry stone monuments scattered around the country today. Houses were built of dressed stone similar to the ones in Ancient Egypt, and there are examples of courtyards, and large stone walls, such as the Wargaade Wall, enclosing settlements.

The peaceful introduction of Islam in the early medieval era of Somalia's history brought Islamic architectural influences from Arabia and Persia, which stimulated a shift in construction from dry stone, and other related materials, to coral stone, sun-dried bricks, and the widespread use of limestone in Somali architecture. Many of the new architectural designs, such as mosques, were built on the ruins of older structures, a practice that would continue over and over again throughout the following centuries.

===== Dhulbahante garesa =====
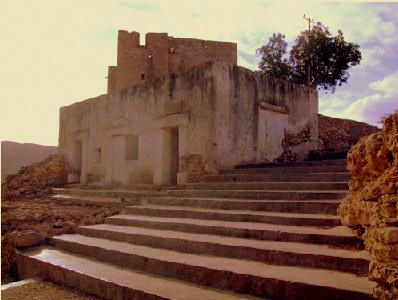
Sideway view of a Dervish fort/Dhulbahante garesa in Eyl, Somalia

In the official Dervish-written letter's description of the 1920 air, sea and land campaign and the fall of Taleh in February 1920, in an April 1920 letter transcribed from the original Arabic script into Italian by the incumbent Governatori della Somalia, the British are described taking twenty-seven garesas or 27 houses from the Dhulbahante clan: (Note: To see the discussion for the Italian-language wiki community on the Caroselli garesa quote, see this link and this link *The Caroselli source ascribes "garesa" to British captured forts; for a quote that Taleh fort was British captured, see quote "It was most fortunate that Tale was so easily captured" (Douglas Jardine, 1923).)

Ai primi di aprile giungeva, a mezzo di corrieri dervisc di Belet Uen, una lettera diretta dal Mulla "Agli Italiani" con la quale, in sostanza, giustificando la sua rapida sconfitta coll'attriburla a defezione dei suoi seguaci Dulbohanta, chiedeva la nostra mediazione presso gli Inglesi ... Gl'Inglesi che sapevano questo ci son piombati addosso con tutta la gente e con sei volatili (aeroplani) ... i Dulbohanta nella maggior parte si sono arresi agli inglesi e han loro consegnato ventisette garese (case) ricolme di fucili, munizioni e danaro.

Translation:

In early April there came, by way of dervish couriers of Beledweyne, a letter sent by the Mullah "To The Italians" in which, in substance, he justified his rapid defeat by attributing it to the defection of his Dhulbahante followers and asked for our mediation with the English. The English, who knew this, descended on us with all their men and with six birds (airplanes)." ... the Dhulbahante surrendered for the most part to the British and handed twenty-seven garesas (houses) full of guns, ammunition and money over to them.

==== Tanzania ====
Engaruka is a ruined settlement on the slopes of Mount Ngorongoro in northern Tanzania. Seven stone-terraced villages comprised the settlement. A complex structure of stone channels along the mountain's base was used to dike, dam, and level surrounding river waters for irrigation of individual plots of land. Some of these irrigation channels were several kilometers long. The channels irrigated a total area of 5,000 acres (20 km^{2}).

===== Swahili States =====
Farther south, increased trade with Arab merchants, and the development of ports, saw the birth of Swahili architecture. An outgrowth of indigenous Bantu settlements, one of the earliest examples is the Palace of Husuni Kubwa, lying west of Kilwa, built about 1245. As with many other early Swahili buildings, coral rag was the main construction material, and even the roof was constructed by attaching coral to timbers. The palace at Kilwa Kisiwani was a two-story tower, in a walled enclosure. Other notable structures from the period include the pillar tombs of Malindi and Mnarani in Kenya and elsewhere, originally made of coral rag, and later from stone. Later examples include Zanzibar's Stone Town, with its famous carved doors and the Great Mosque of Kilwa.

A visitor in 1331 CE considered the Tanzanian city Kilwa to be of world class. He wrote that it was the "principal city on the coast the greater part of whose inhabitants are Zanj of very black complexion." Later on he says that: "Kilwa is one of the most beautiful and well-constructed cities in the world. The whole of it is elegantly built."

==== Uganda ====
===== Buganda =====
Initially, the hilltop capital, or kibuga, of Buganda would be moved to a new hill with each new ruler, or Kabaka. In the late 19th century, a permanent kibuga of Buganda was established at Mengo Hill. The capital, 1.5 miles across, was divided into quarters corresponding to provinces, with each chief building dwellings for his wife, slaves, dependents and visitors. Large plots of land were available for planting bananas and fruits. Roads were wide and well maintained.

===== Kitara and Bunyoro =====
In western Uganda, there are numerous earthworks near the Katonga River. These earthworks have been attributed to the Empire of Kitara. The most famous, Bigo bya Mugenyi, is about 4 square miles (10 km^{2}). The ditch was dug by cutting through 200,000 cubic metres (7,100,000 cu ft) of solid bedrock and earth. The earthwork rampart was about 12 feet (3.7 m) high. It is not certain whether its function was for defense or pastoral use. Little is known about the Ugandan earthworks.

=== Central Africa ===
==== Chad ====
===== Kanem-Bornu =====
Kanem-Bornu's capital city, Birni N'Gazargamu, may have had a population of 200,000. It had four mosques, which could hold up to 12,000 worshippers. It was surrounded by a 25-foot-high (7.6 m) wall more than 1-mile (1.6 km) in circumference. Many large streets extended from the esplanade and connected to 660 roads. The main buildings were built with red brick. Other buildings were built with straw and adobe.

==== Democratic Republic of the Congo ====
===== Kongo =====
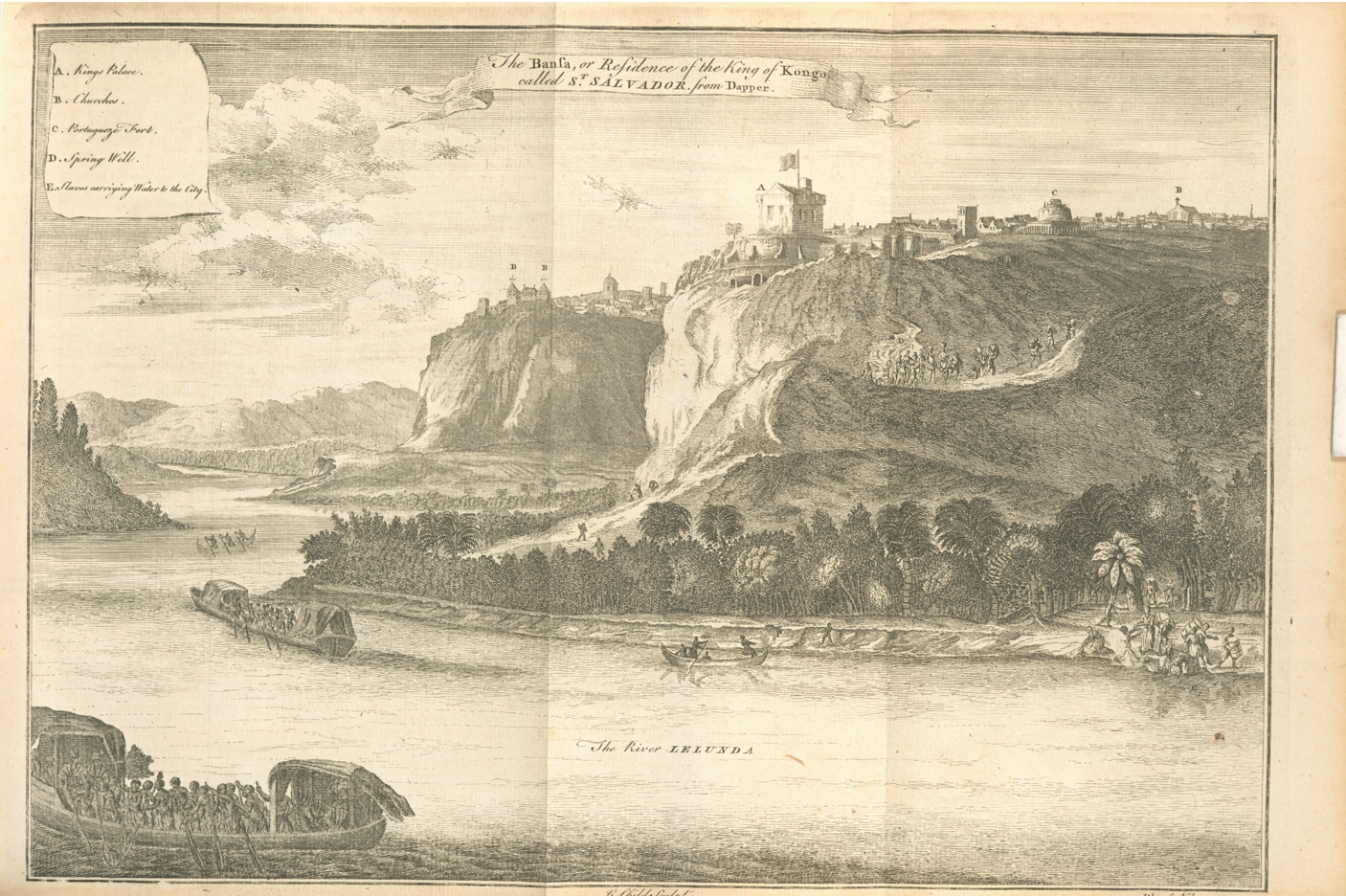
The capital of the Kingdom of Kongo

With a population of more than 30,000, Mbanza Congo was the capital of the Kingdom of Kongo. The city sat atop a cliff, with a river running below through a forested valley. The king's dwelling was described as an enclosure, a mile-and-a-half in extent, with walled pathways, courtyard, gardens, decorated huts, and palisades. An early explorer described it as looking like a Cretan labyrinth.

===== Kuba =====
The capital of the Kuba Kingdom was surrounded by a 40-inch-high (1.0 m) fence. Inside the fence were roads, a walled royal palace, and urban buildings. The palace was rectangular and in the center of the city.

===== Luba =====
The Luba tended to cluster in small villages, with rectangular houses facing a single street. Kilolo, patrilineal chieftains, headed the local village government, under the protection of the king. Cultural life centered around the kitenta, the royal compound, which later came to be a permanent capital. The kitenta drew artists, poets, musicians and craftsmen, spurred by royal and court patronage.

===== Lunda =====
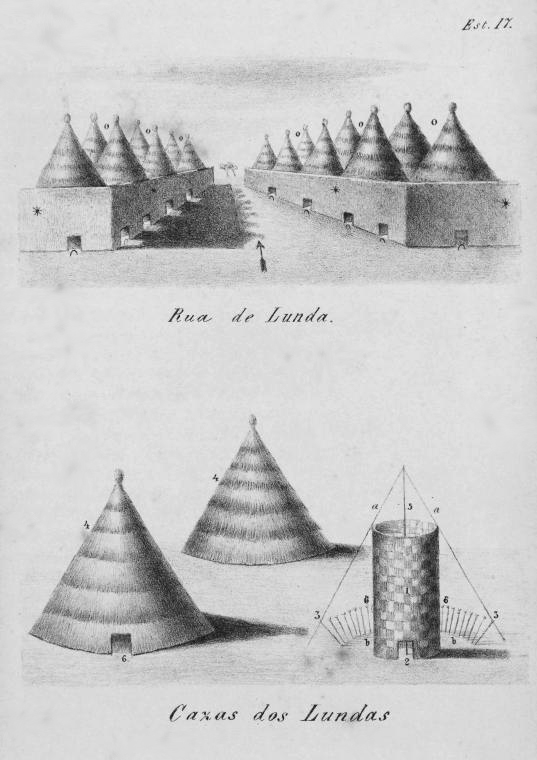
Lunda dwellings displaying the square and the cone-on-ground types of African vernacular architecture

Musumba the capital of the Kingdom of Lunda, was 100 kilometres (62 mi) from the Kasai River, in open woodland, between two rivers 15 kilometres (9.3 mi) apart. The city was surrounded by fortified earthen ramparts and dry moats. The compound of the Mwato Yamvo (sovereign ruler) was surrounded by large fortifications of double-layered tree, or wood, ramparts. Musumba had multiple courtyards with designated functions, straight roads, and public squares. Its cleanliness was noted by European observers.

==== Mozambique ====
===== Maravi =====
The Maravi people built bridges (uraro) of bamboo because of changing river depths. Bamboo was placed parallel to each other and tied together by bark (maruze). One end of the bridge would be tied to a tree. The bridge would curve downward.

==== Zambia ====
===== Eastern Lunda =====
The Eastern Lunda dwelling of the Kazembe was described as containing fenced roads a mile long. The enclosing walls were made of grass, 12 to 13 span in height. The enclosed roads led to a rectangular hut opened on the west side. In the center was a wooden base with a statue on top of about 3 span in height.

=== Southern Africa ===
==== Madagascar ====
Architecture in Antananarivo, Madagascar, in 1905

The Southeast Asian origins of the first settlers of Madagascar are reflected in the island's architecture, typified by rectangular dwellings topped with peaked roofs and often built on short stilts. Coastal dwellings, generally made of plant materials, are more like those of East Africa; those of the central highlands tend to be constructed in cob or brick. The introduction of brick-making, by European missionaries in the 19th century, led to the emergence of a distinctly Malagasy architectural style that blends the norms of traditional wooden aristocratic homes with European details.

In the mid-2nd millennium CE, the megalithic funerary monuments of Madagascar were constructed amid the emergent period of the Merina Kingdom. Some of the megaliths remain utilized by Malagasy-speakers for funerary practices (e.g., ceremony of turning the dead) in present-day.

==== Namibia ====
The fortress of ǁKhauxaǃnas, built by the Oorlam in southeastern Namibia, included a wall that was 700 metres (2,300 ft) in length and 2 metres (6 ft 7 in) in height. It was built with stone slabs and displays features of both the Zimbabwean and Transvaal-Free-State styles of stone construction.

==== South Africa ====
===== Sotho-Tswana =====
Sotho–Tswana architecture represents the other stone-building tradition of southern Africa, centered in the transvaal, highveld north and south of the Vaal. Numerous large stonewalled enclosures and stone-house foundations have been found in the region. Tswana, the capital of the Kwena (ruler), was a stone-walled town as large as the capital of Eastern Lunda.

At sites such as Kweneng' Ruins, the Tswana lived in city states with stone walls and complex sociopolitical structures that they built in the 1300s or earlier. These cities had populations of up to 20,000 people, which at the time rivalled Cape Town in size.

===== Zulu and Nguni =====
Zulu Architecture was constructed with more perishable materials. Dome-shaped huts typically come to mind when one thinks of Zulu dwellings, but later on their design evolved into dome over cylinder-shaped walls. Zulu capital cities were elliptical in plan. The exterior was lined with a durable wood palisade. Domed huts, in rows of 6 to 8, stood just inside the palisade. In the center was the kraal, used by the king to examine his soldiers, hold cattle, or conduct ceremonies. It was an empty circular area at the center of the capital, enclosed by a less durable interior palisade, compared to the exterior. The entrance to the city was opposite to the fortified royal enclosure called the Isigodlo.

==== Zimbabwe and South Africa ====
===== Mapungubwe =====
Mapungubwe is considered the most socially complex society in southern Africa and the first southern African culture to display economic differentiation. The elite lived separately in a mountain settlement made of sandstone. It was the precursor to Great Zimbabwe. Large amounts of dirt were carried to the top of the hill. At the bottom of the hill was a natural amphitheater, and at the top an elite graveyard. There were only two pathways to the top, one following a narrow steep cleft along the side of the hill of which observers at the top had a clear view.

===== Great Zimbabwe =====
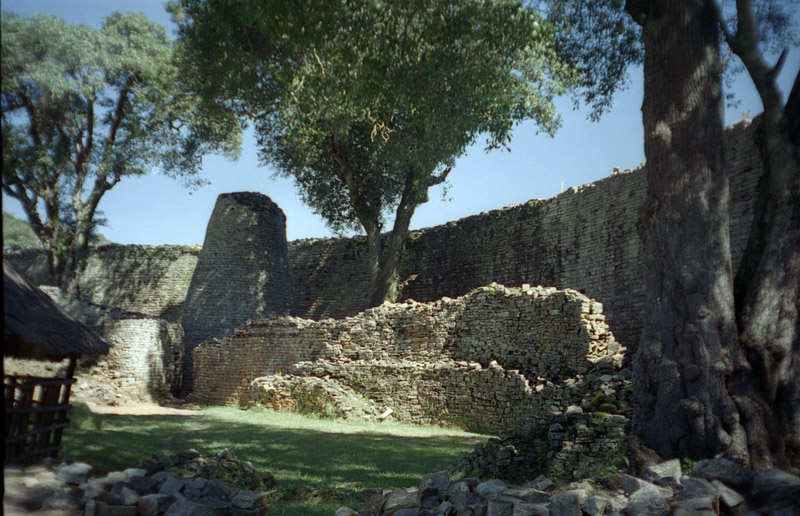
The conical tower inside the Great Enclosure in Great Zimbabwe, a medieval city built by a prosperous culture

Great Zimbabwe was the largest stone structure in pre-colonial Southern Africa. It was constructed and expanded for more than 300 years in a local style that eschewed rectilinearity for flowing curves. Neither the first nor the last of some 300 similar complexes located on the Zimbabwean plateau, Great Zimbabwe is set apart by the large scale of its structures. Its most formidable edifice, commonly referred to as the Great Enclosure, has dressed stone walls as high as 36 feet (11 m) extending for approximately 820 feet (250 m), making it the largest ancient structure south of the Sahara. Houses within the enclosure were circular and constructed of wattle and daub, with conical thatched roofs.

===== Torwa State =====
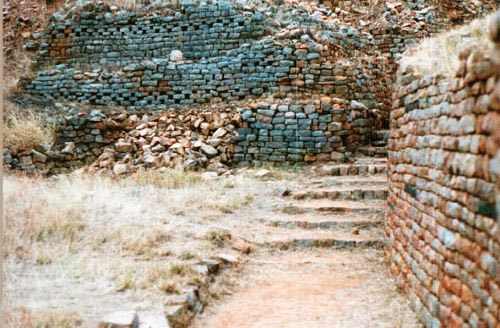
Terraced hill, entranceway of Khami, capital of the Torwa State

Khami was the capital of the Kingdom of Butua during the Torwa dynasty. It was the successor to Great Zimbabwe and where the techniques of Great Zimbabwe were further refined and developed. Elaborate walls were constructed by connecting carefully cut stones to form terraced hills.

== Modern architecture ==
=== African rural architecture ===
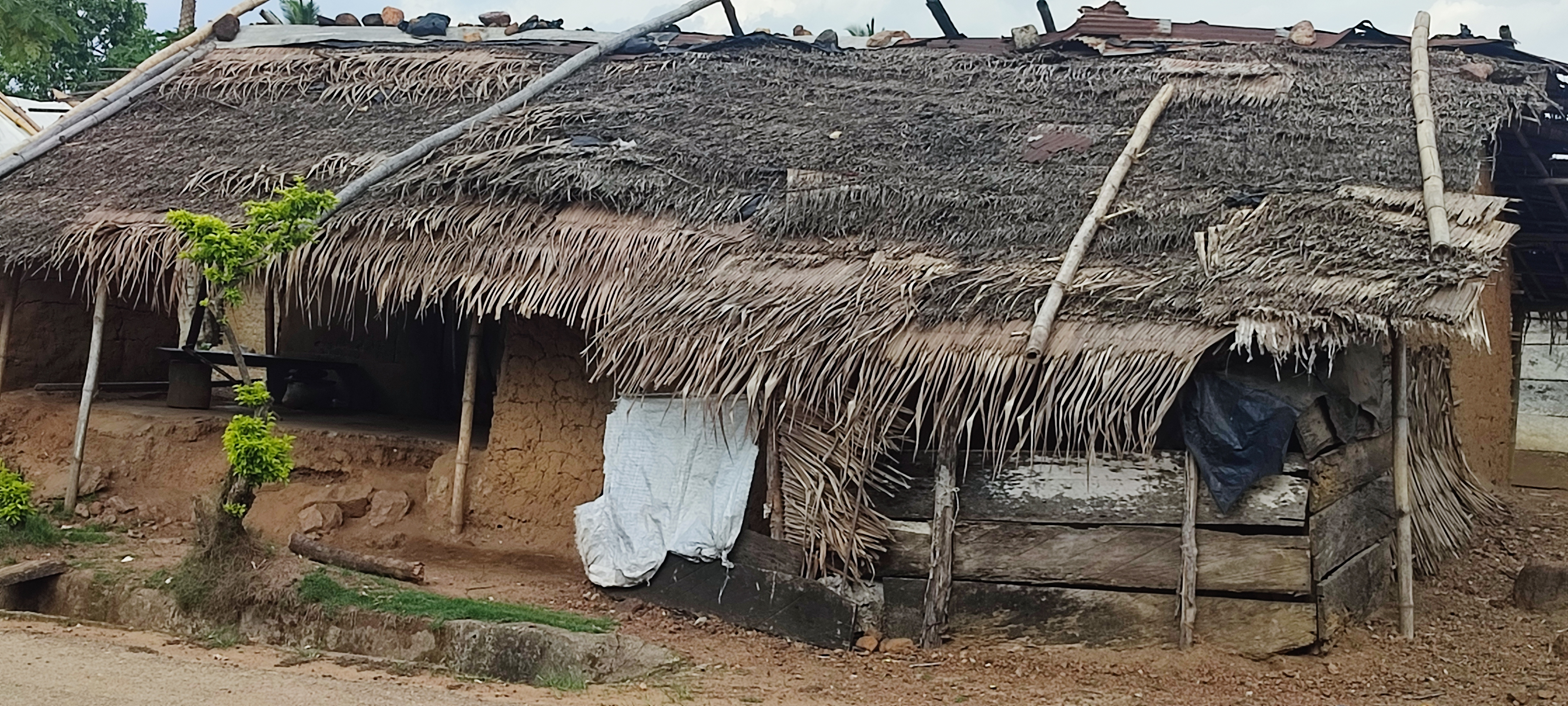
A mud house in a rural area in Nigeria

Rural African architecture research has generally been viewed in a limited perspective. Architecture as a practice in rural Africa also extends to the construction of religious dwellings as well.

Typically, materials such as wood, metal, terra-cotta, and stone were used in the construction of armature, walls, floors, and roofing for rural homes and community buildings. Changes in structure and material are based on changes in the climate, what building materials are available, and the techniques and skills of an area. As the construction of these buildings required many individual procedures, the overall execution of constructing homes and communal dwellings within a rural village is a communal process. However, the owner [of the dwelling] has the most control over the construction process and is considered the master builder.

=== Sub-Saharan African rural architecture ===
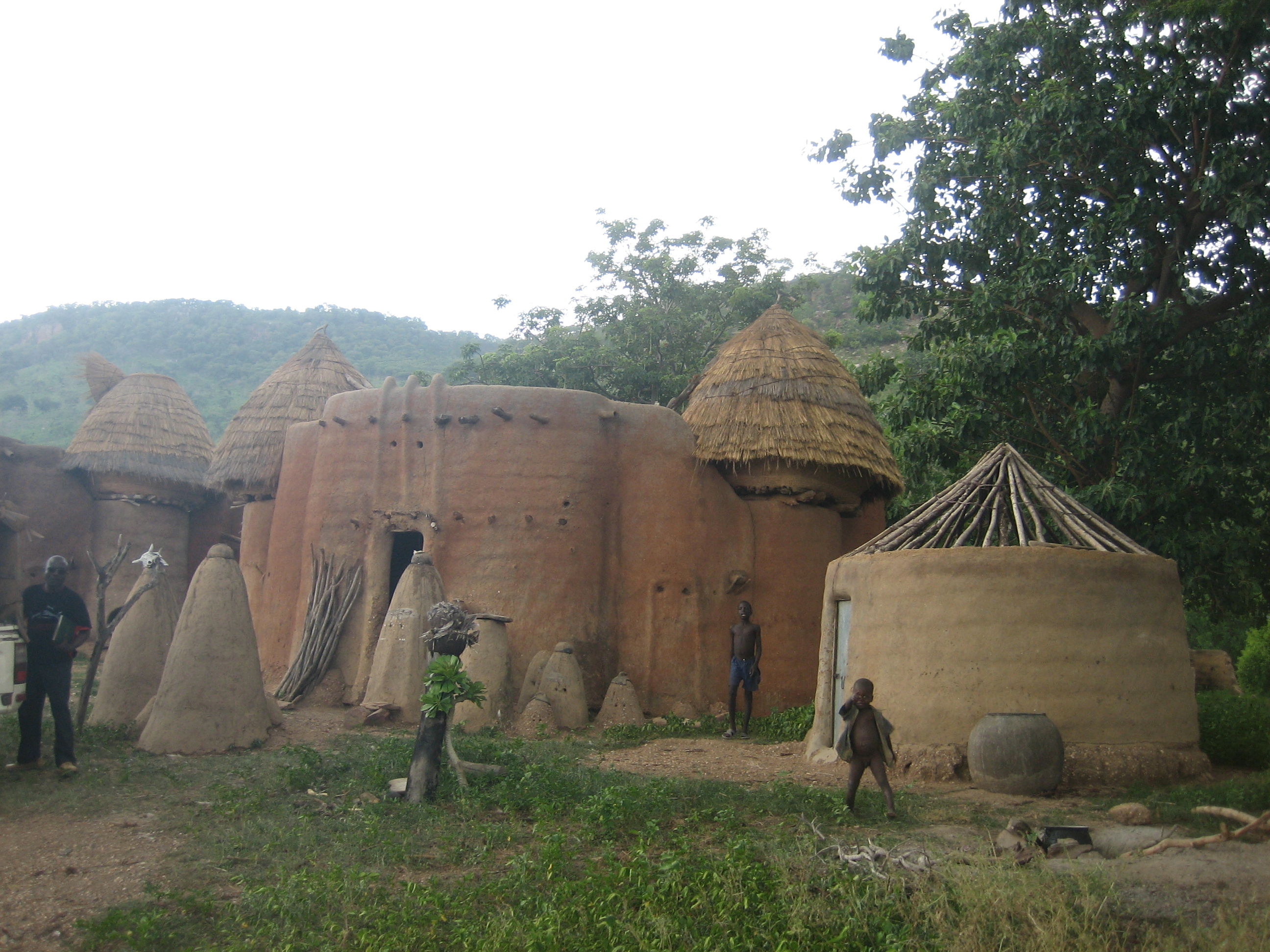
Taberma houses in Togo

Although there generally a wide range of architectural styles across Africa, sub-saharan Africa encompasses the widest diversity in architectural styles due to the extensive scope of physical [climate] settings.

==== Coastal rainforest ====
In the coastal rainforest belt of Africa, where temperatures are regularly torrid and humid regardless of daytime or nighttime, rural dwellings require interior cross-ventilation to ensure maximum bodily comfort. To achieve this, the craftsperson would incorporate openings into the dwelling. Open, screen-like walls and elevated floorings would be built to provide natural airflow throughout the building.

==== Inland savannah ====
In contrast to the coastal rainforest belt, the inland savannah climate, which is composed of an annual, brief rainy season and a long, dry season in which chilling winds blow into the region from the Sahara, require an architectural solution that can both cut the biting cold of dusk and prevent individuals from enduring the overwhelming heat of the midday sun.

=== Modern African Rural Architecture [Ethiopia, Ghana, Nigeria, and South Africa] ===
==== Ethiopia ====
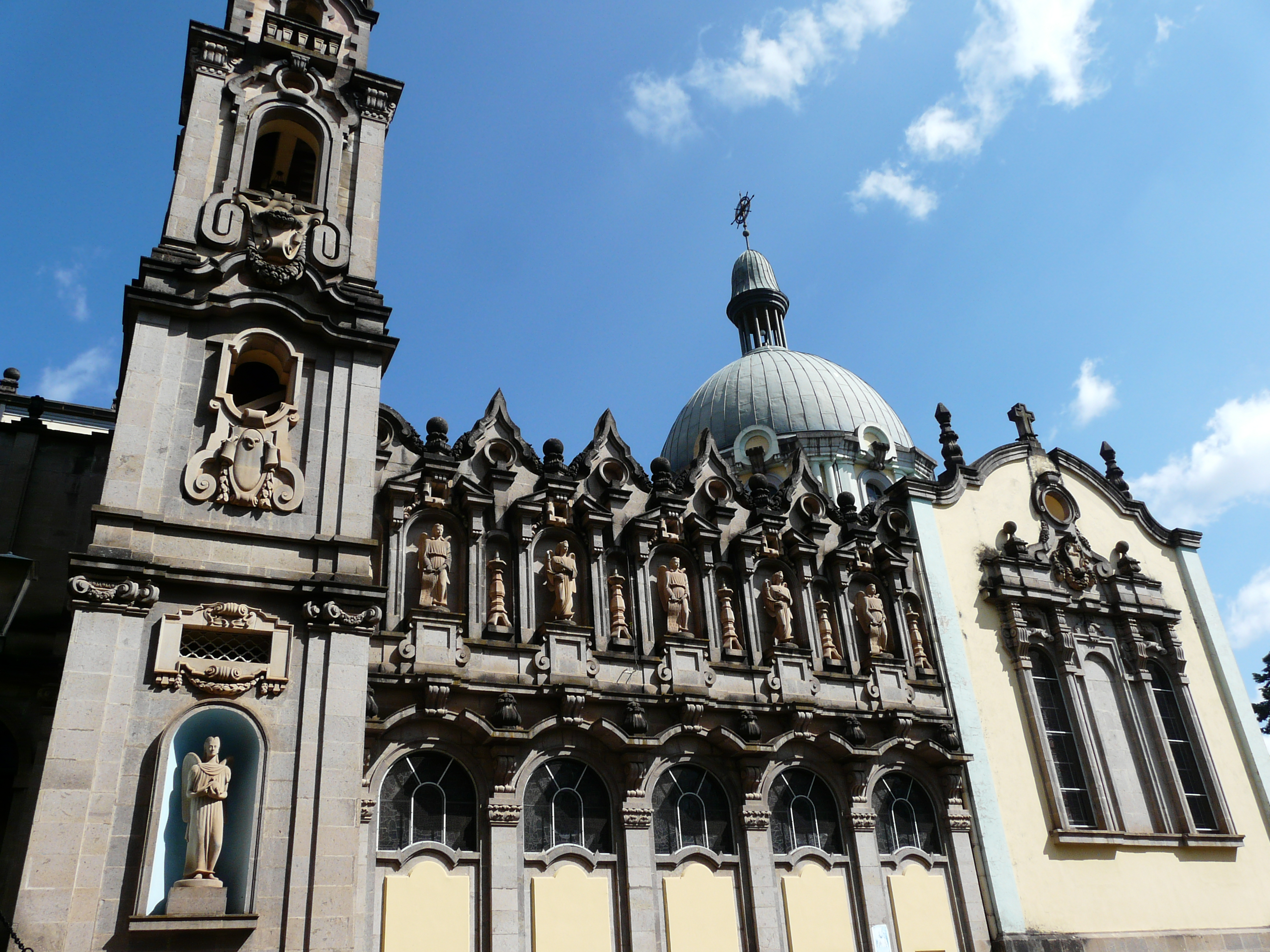
Holy Trinity Cathedral (Addis Ababa)

Structures neighboring the city of Lalibela, Ethiopia like the Monolithic churches have been hewed from stones within the ground. Systems of catacombs were built inside for ceremonial purposes as were ditches imitating the River Jordan in Jerusalem and the ditches separate the churches into three groups, five in the north, five in the east and two in west. These churches were carved out in the 12th century during King Lalibela's reign. Another church that can illustrate the architecture style and design in Ethiopia in the modern era is the Holy Trinity Cathedral in Addis Ababa which contains the tombs of Emperor Haile Salassie, his wife, and those who were executed during the Italian regime's occupation. It is at the epicenter of the capital and in close proximity to the imperial palace. Materials used in this structure includes a huge quantity of copper for the dome and statues positioned in various locations on and around the cathedral. It should also be noted that it imitates the Aksumites (Kingdom of Axum) artistic design.

==== Ghana ====
In Ghana, Larabanga Mosque is a prime example in building from packed earth which was and continues to be a method used today. Sudanese architecture influences this mosque but it is notably smaller than many mosques that exist in West Africa. As construction of the mosque depends on the natural materials available, there is an environmental strain in Ghana and surrounding countries that use this method of building housing. The mosque is held together by the logs protruding from the building surface. The exterior of the mosque has whitewashed walls which are renewed every year.

==== Nigeria ====
The Demas Nwoko is a chapel constructed between 1967 and 1975 using locally sourced materials such as concrete stone, brick, stained glass and wood. The interior walls of the chapel are covered with crosses of all sizes and it appears as if they are stained glass as they are luminescent. Unlike chapels, housing compounds in Nigeria frequently had a communal area like courtyards or shared spaces which were an important social aspect for residents. Emir's Palace also known as The Hausa Architecture in Zaria is traditionally divided into three parts: a private area (women's area), semi private area, and public area. The palace is surrounded by the city. Nigerian architecture was shaped by Islamic culture where the women were sheltered and protected by private spaces the compound provided. Like Emir's palace, the Yoruba structure has large family residential areas in them and courtyards were commonly used by everyone.

==== South Africa ====
In 1948 architecture in South Africa was heavily influenced by the Apartheid as segregation was enforced in all aspects of life. The Windhoek Airport, today known as Eros, was built in 1957, and the post office in Polokwane, South Africa, was constructed in the capital of Limpopo Province and had similar groundwork to the airport. The floor plan for the airport terminal had European and non-European entrances and exits. The post office is U-shaped and like the airport there are separate entrances and exits. Brazilian modernism affected how architecture changed in the mid-twentieth century in South Africa.

=== Modern Islamic African Architecture ===
In other areas of the world Islamic architecture consists of palaces, tombs, and mosques. In West Africa, the mosque itself embodies Islam. The layout of a mosque is predetermined by Islamic orthodoxy coming from the idea that rejecting certain elements, like a minaret, is seen as offensive to the religion itself. The main focus of material can be seen in mud architecture. From this architectural method came several variations, the most recent being the Bobo Dioulasso and the Mosquée de Kong [Mosque of Kong]. These types have a focus on expression of a politico-religious structure within a village, different from the earlier mosques focused on imperial organization and which were much bigger in size. These two types of mosques are smaller. The difference between the Bobo and Kongo type lies in having to adapt to climate conditions as opposed to cultural tradition. While the basics of mosques remains the same throughout the region, there are variations within Africa mostly dependent on the climate of the area and the accommodations that need to be made for that specific region.

==== Grand Mosque of Bobo-Dioulasso ====
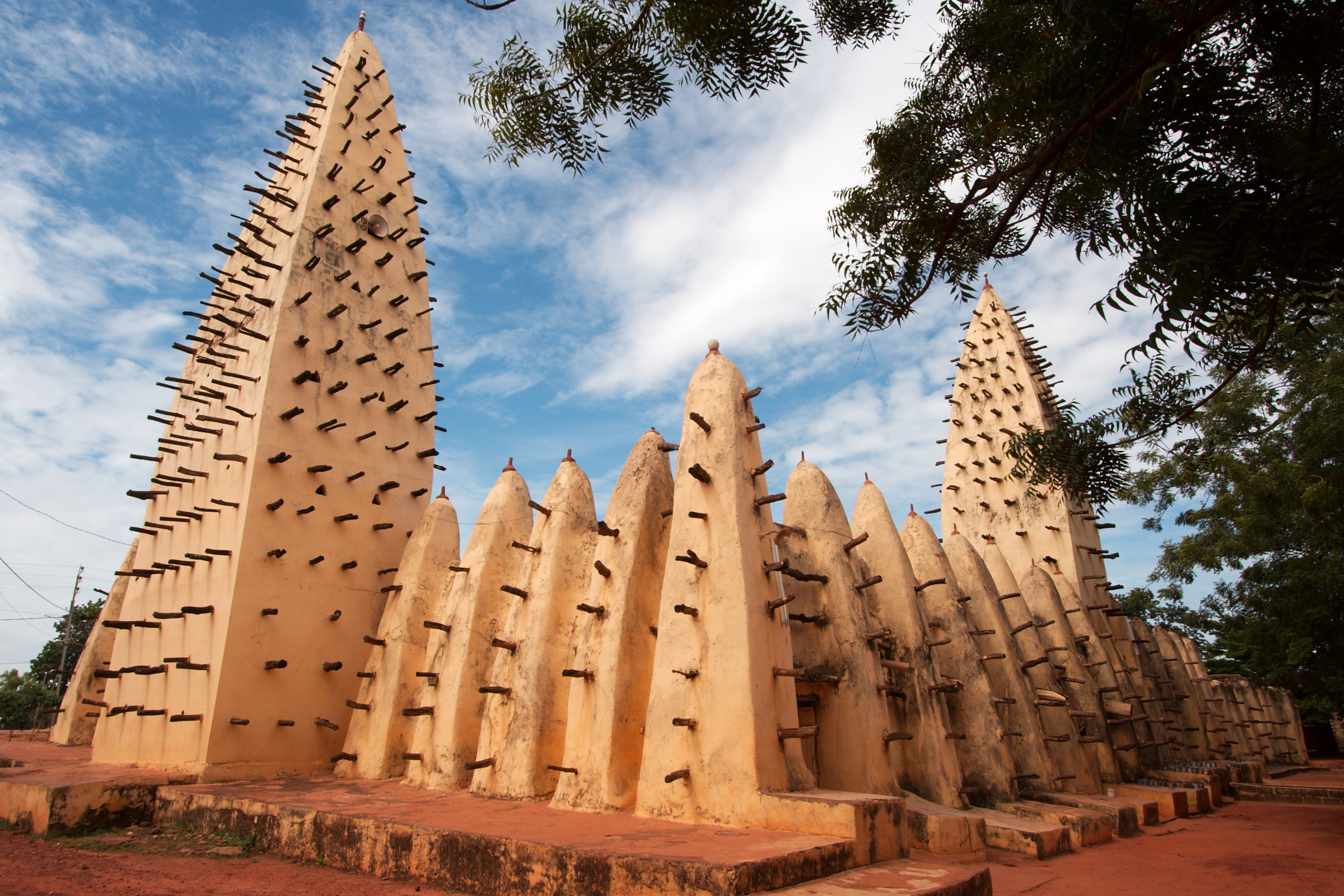
Grand Mosque of Bobo-Dioulasso

At the Grand Mosque of Bobo-Dioulasso, vertical buttresses minarets are a part of the mosques, flaring out and thickening of the buttresses at the base of these elements are still evident but disappearing due to reduced scale and changes in the climate. Projecting timbers and horizontal bracing are added due to the increased humidity of the southern savannah. There are parts of the classic mosque within the modern mosque that still remain. This can be seen in the enclosed prayer hall and interior courtyard.

==== Mosquée de Kong [Mosque of Kong] ====
Heavier buttressing is required in the Mosque of Kong because of more rain in the area. This area also sits closer to a rainforest, making wood a material that can be more easily accessed for reinforcement within the structure. Due to the generally wet climate, this mosque also requires more maintenance due to consistent erosion.

==== Kawara Mosque ====
One last example can be seen within the Kawara mosque. The Kawara lacks verticality or monumentality, but is clear in its three dimensions.

=== Ethiopia ===
==== External influences ====
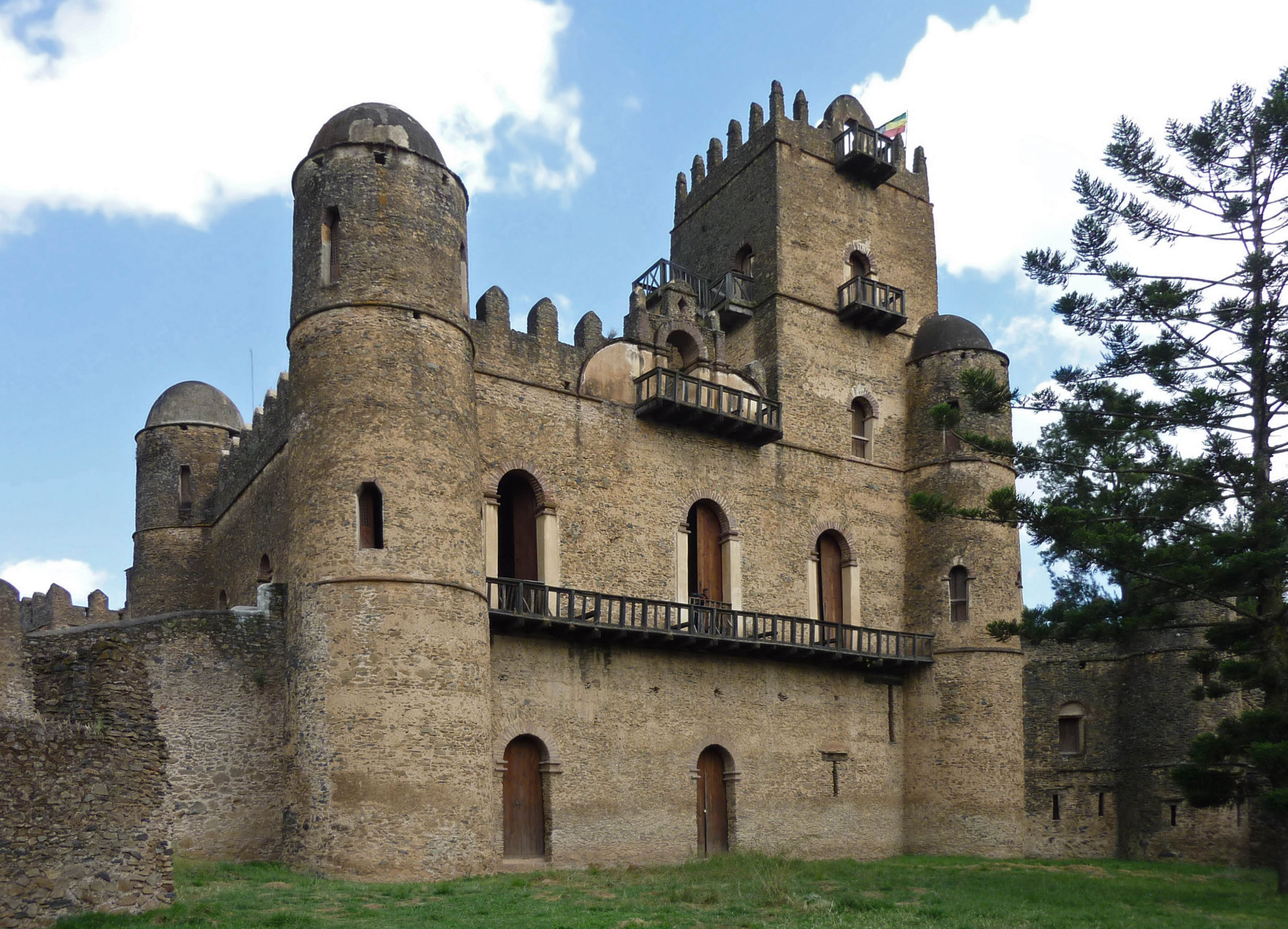
Fasiledes's castle, Fasil Ghebbi, Gondar, Ethiopia

In the early modern period, Ethiopia's absorption of diverse new influences—such as Baroque, Arab, Turkish and Gujarati Indian styles—began with the arrival of Portuguese Jesuit missionaries in the 16th and 17th centuries. Portuguese soldiers had initially come in the mid-16th century as allies to aid Ethiopia in its fight against Adal, and the Jesuits came hoping to convert the country.

Some Turkish influence may have entered the country during the late 16th century during Ethiopia's war with the Ottoman Empire (see Habesh), which resulted in an increased building of fortresses and castles. Ethiopia, naturally hard to defensible because of its numerous ambas or flat-topped mountains and rugged terrain, gained little tactical use from these structures, in contrast to advantages they bestowed when placed on the flat terrain of Europe and other areas; and so Ethiopia had not nurtured the tradition. Castle building, especially around the Lake Tana region, began with the reign of Sarsa Dengel; and subsequent emperors maintained the tradition, eventually resulting in the creation of the Fasil Ghebbi (royal enclosure of castles) in the newly founded capital, Gondar (1635).

Emperor Susenyos (r. 1606–1632) converted to Catholicism in 1622 and attempted to make it the state religion, declaring it as such from 1624 until his abdication. During this time, he employed Arab, Gujarati (brought by the Jesuits), Jesuit and local masons, some of whom were Beta Israel, and adopted their styles. With the reign of his son Fasilides, most of these foreigners were expelled, although some of their architectural styles were absorbed into the prevailing Ethiopian architectural style. This style of the Gondarine dynasty would persist throughout the 17th and 18th centuries, especially, and influenced modern 19th-century-and-later styles.

=== Europeans and European influences ===
==== Afrikaner ====
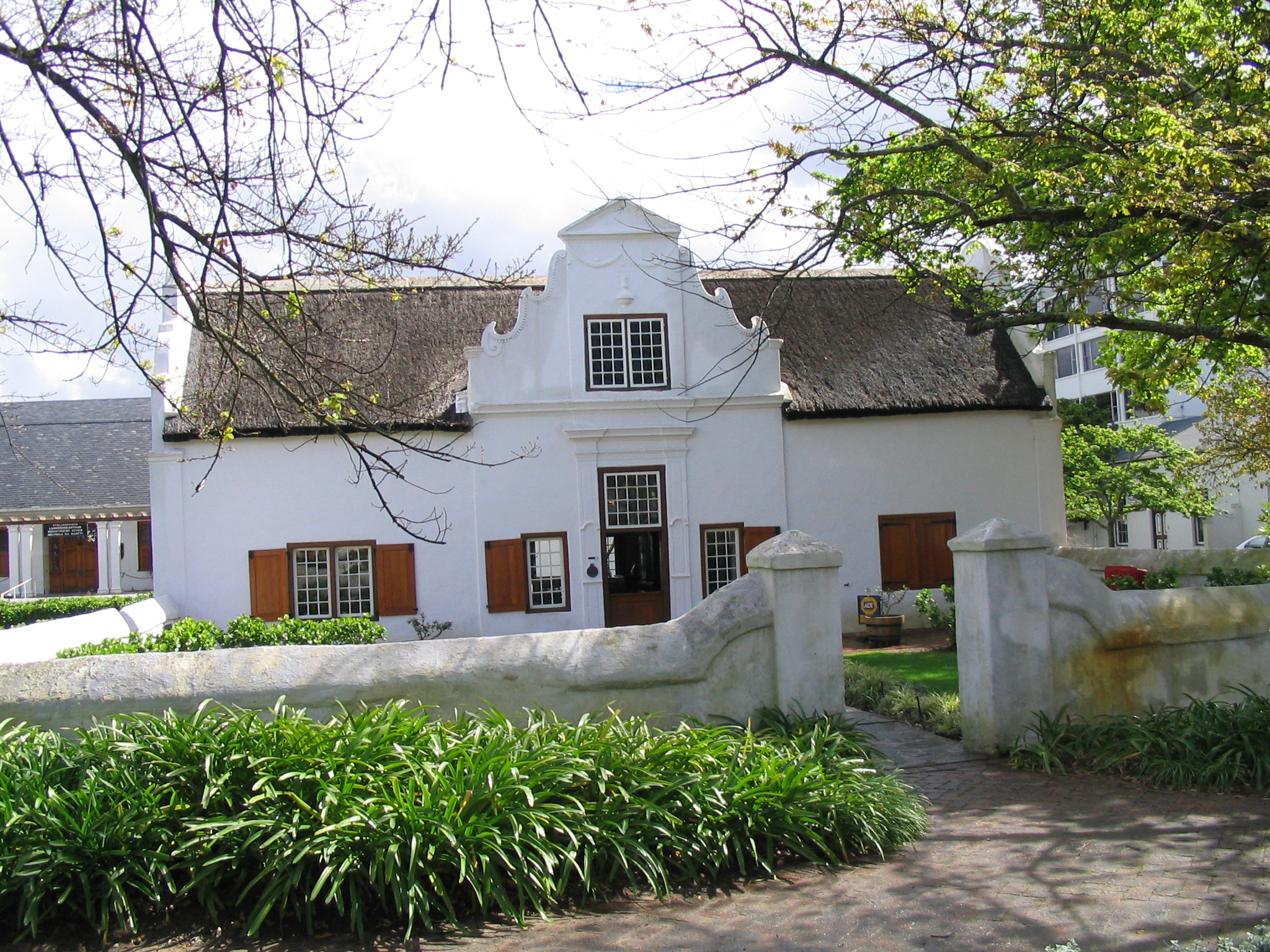
Typical Cape Dutch styled house in Stellenbosch

Cape Dutch architecture is traditional Afrikaner architecture and is one of the most distinctive types of settler architecture in the world. It was developed during the century-and-a-half that the Cape was a Dutch colony. Even by the end of that period, the early 19th-century, the colony was inhabited by fewer than fifty thousand people, spread over an area roughly the size of the United Kingdom. The Cape Dutch–style buildings showed a remarkable consistency and were clearly related to rural architecture in northwestern Europe but equally clearly having its own unmistakable African character and features.

==== Colonial fortifications in West Africa ====
Early European colonies on the West African coast built large forts, as can be seen at Elmina Castle, Cape Coast Castle, Christiansborg, Fort Jesus, and elsewhere. These were usually plain, with little ornamentation, but with more adornment at Dixcove Fort. Other embellishments were gradually accreted, with the style inspiring later buildings such as Lamu Fort and the stone palace of Kumasi.

==== Eclecticism ====
European artists in the 18th century would go out to Africa and the Middle East in hopes of finding new inspiration to include in their art. These travels became common and changed political and cultural relations between Africa, the Middle East, and Europe. By the late 19th century, most buildings reflected the fashionable European eclecticism and transplanted Mediterranean, or even Northern European, styles. Examples of colonial towns from this era survive at Saint-Louis, Grand-Bassam, Swakopmund, Cape Town, Luanda. A few buildings were pre-fabricated in Europe and shipped over for erection. This European tradition continued well into the 20th century, with the construction of European-style manor houses, such as Shiwa Ng'andu in what is now Zambia, or the Boer homesteads in South Africa, and with many town buildings.

=== Modernism ===
The effect of modern architecture began to be felt in the 1920s and 1930s. Le Corbusier designed several never-built schemes for Algeria, including ones for Nemours and for the reconstruction of Algiers. Elsewhere, Steffen Ahrends was active in South Africa, and Ernst May in Nairobi and Mombasa.

==== Nigeria ====
Cocoa House is a 26-story high rise building and shaped as a double isosceles trapezoid and made by cocoa, timber, and rubber was built in 1932 by two Italian constructors Pietro Carlo Cappa and Vigino D'Alberto.

Cocoa House original name was Ile Awon Agbe which it means House of Farmers in Yoruba.

==== Eritrea ====
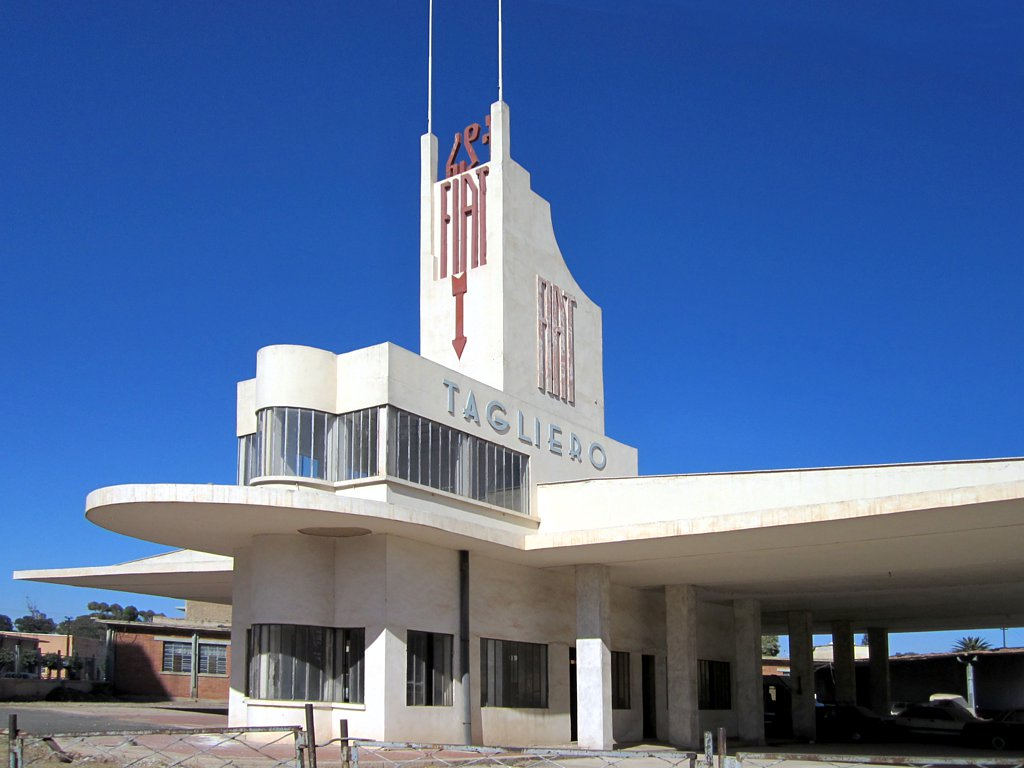
The Fiat Tagliero Building (1938), a popular Italian modernist building in Asmara

Italian futurist architecture heavily influenced the designs of Asmara. Planned villages were constructed in Libya and Italian East Africa, including the new town of Tripoli, all utilising modern designs.

After 1945, Maxwell Fry and Jane Drew extended their work on British schools into Ghana, and also designed the University of Ibadan. The reconstruction of Algiers offered more opportunities, with Sacred Heart Cathedral of Algiers, and universities by Oscar Niemeyer, Kenzo Tange, Jakob Zweifel, and Skidmore, Owings and Merrill. But modern architecture in this sense largely remained the preserve of European architects until the 1960s, one notable exception being Le Groupe Transvaal in South Africa, which built homes inspired by Walter Gropius and Le Corbusier.

==== Morocco ====
Elie Azagury became the first Moroccan modernist architect in the 1950s. The Groupe des Architectes Modernes Marocains—at first led by Michel Écochard, director of urban planning under the French Protectorate—was active building public housing in the Hay Mohammedi neighborhood of Casablanca that provided a "culturally specific living tissue" for laborers and migrants from the countryside. Sémiramis, Nid d'Abeille (Honeycomb), and Carrières Centrales were some of the first examples of this Vernacular Modernism. Carrières Centrales was the first project to employ the 8x8 grid associated with GAMMA.

===== 1953 CIAM =====
At the 1953 Congrès Internationaux d'Architecture Moderne (CIAM), Écochard presented, along with Georges Candilis, the work of ATBAT-Afrique—the Africa branch of Atelier des Bâtisseurs, founded in 1947 by figures including Le Corbusier, Vladimir Bodiansky, and André Wogenscky. It was a study of Casablanca's bidonvilles entitled "Habitat for the Greatest Number". It argued against doctrine, arguing that architects must consider local culture and climate in their designs. This generated great debate among modernist architects around the world and eventually provoked a schism.

===== Post-independence =====
The French-Moroccan architect Jean-François Zevaco built experimental modernist works in Morocco. Abdeslam Faraoui, Patrice de Mazières, and Mourad Ben Embarek were also notable modernist architects in Morocco.

=== Post-colonial architecture ===
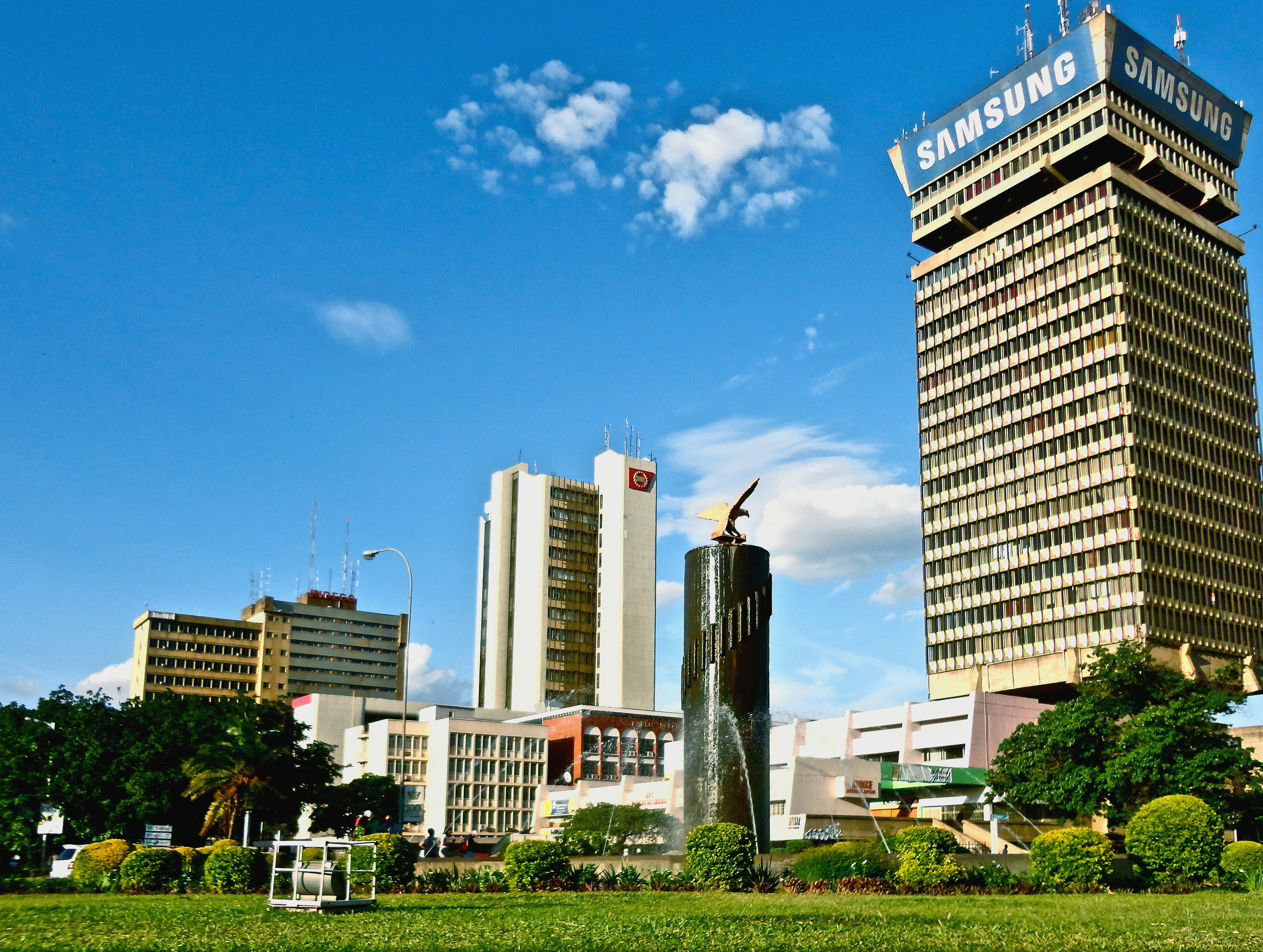
Downtown Lusaka, capital city of Zambia with FINDECO House on the right

A number of new cities were built following the end of colonialism, while others were greatly expanded. Perhaps the best known example is that of Abidjan, where the majority of buildings were still designed by high-profile non-African architects. In Yamoussoukro, the Basilica of Our Lady of Peace of Yamoussoukro is an example of a desire for monumentality in these new cities, but Arch 22 in the old Gambian capital of Banjul displays the same bravado.

Experimental designs have also appeared, most notably the Eastgate Centre in Zimbabwe. With an advanced form of natural air-conditioning, this building was designed to respond precisely to Harare's climate and needs, rather than import less suitable designs. Neo-vernacular architecture continues, for instance with the Great Mosque of Niono or Hassan Fathy's New Gourna.

Other notable structures of recent years have been some of the world's largest dams. The Aswan High Dam and Akosombo Dam hold back the world's largest reservoirs. In recent years, there has also been renewed bridge building in many nations, while the Trans-Gabon Railway is perhaps the last of the great railways to be constructed.

=== Traditional revival ===
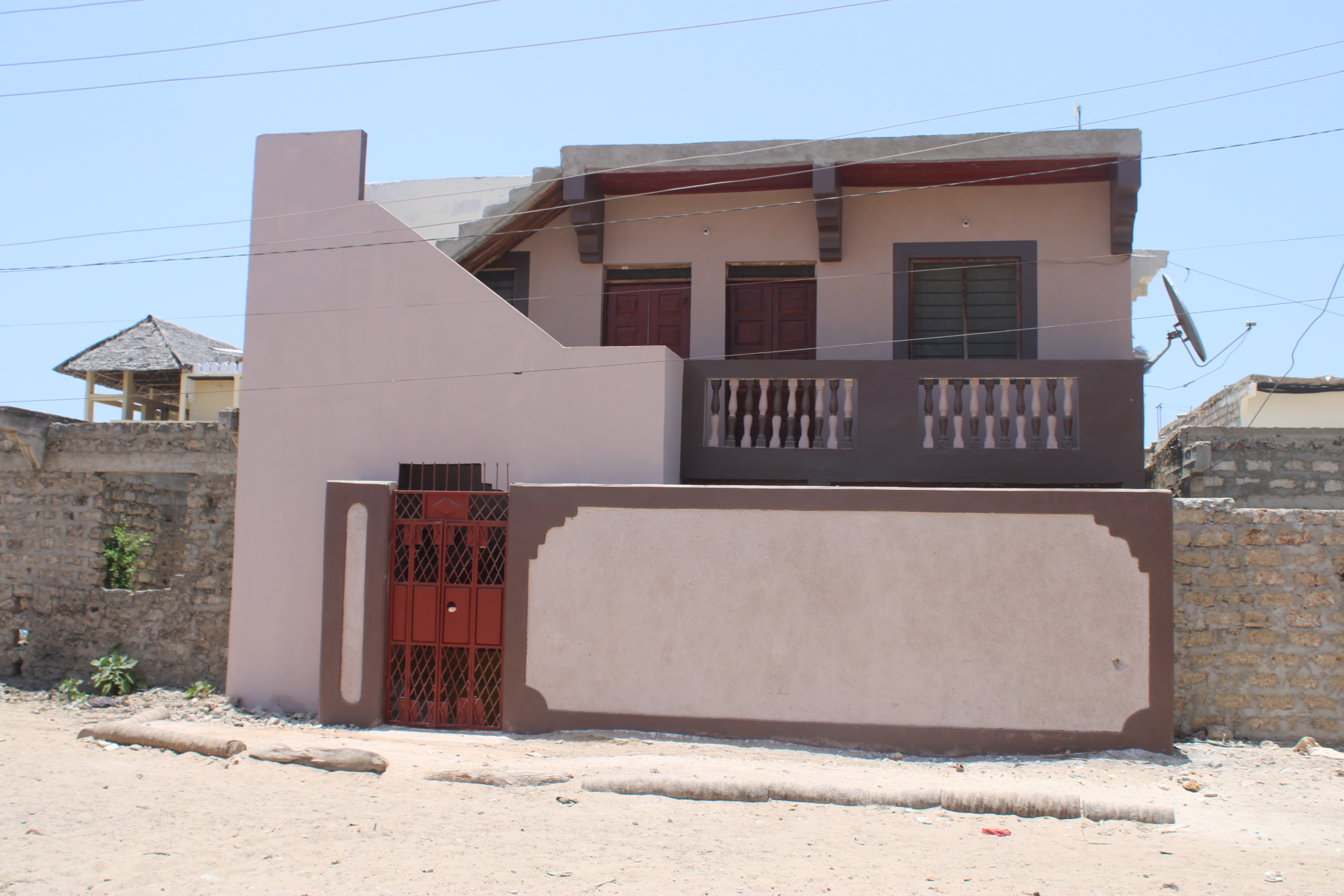
Modern housing in Lamu, Kenya

The revival of interest in traditional styles can be traced to Cairo in the early 19th century. This had spread to Algiers and Morocco by the early 20th century, from which time colonial buildings across the continent began to consist of recreations of traditional African architecture, the Jamia Mosque in Nairobi being a typical example. In some cases, architects attempted to mix local and European styles, such as at Bagamoyo.

== See also ==
- ArchiAfrika
- List of World Heritage Sites in Africa
