= Kweneng' Ruins =

Ruins of a historical city in South Africa

- Location within South Africa
- 26.4954°S 28.1604°E
- Location: Gauteng, South Africa

Kweneng’ ruins are the remains of a pre-colonial Tswana capital occupied from the 14th to the 19th century AD in South Africa. The site is located 30 km south of the modern-day city of Johannesburg. Settlement at the site likely began around the 1300s and saw its peak in the 14th century. The Kweneng' ruins are similar to those built by other early civilizations found in the southern Africa region during this period, including the Luba–Lunda kingdom, Kingdom of Mutapa, Bokoni, and many others, as these groups share ancestry. Kweneng' was the largest of several sizable settlements inhabited by Tswana speakers prior to European arrival. Several circular stone walled family compounds are spread out over an area 10 km long and 2 km wide. It is likely that Kweneng' was abandoned in the 1820s during the period of colonial expansion-related civil wars known as the Mfecane or Difaqane, leading to the dispersal of its inhabitants.

== Location ==
Kweneng' is located in Suikerbosrand Nature Reserve, South Africa. Suikerbosrand consists of two geological systems: the Ventersdorp and the Witwatersrand system. The Ventersdorp system consists of steep mountain sides, flat plains and volcanic soil, which is very fertile. The Witwatersrand system consists of sandstone deposits as well as proteas. The Suikerbosrand Nature Reserve is situated in the grassland biome. The Rocky Highland Grassland and Moist Cool Grassland can be found in this area. This area allowed for easier farming for the Kweneng people.

== History and society ==
The Sotho-Tswana, a group of Bantu speakers who still live in Lesotho, Botswana and South Africa, occupied large and densely populated settlements that were impressive to the first Europeans who first visited them. These explorers used terms such as ‘cities’ and ‘metropolis’ to describe them. Settlement of the site began in the 15th century with scattered homesteads which persisted until the 17th century after which Kweneng’ grew into a city. The classic phase of settlement was between 1750 and 1825. The slave trade in Delagoa Bay, and colonial expansion in the south and east likely led to the abandonment of Kweneng’ and other Sotho-Tswana capitals. Archeologists have found homes destroyed by fire with valuable items such as weapons and beads left behind, suggesting a hasty abandonment. The first Europeans arrived at Kweneng' in 1836, at least 10 years after the site was abandoned. The site would have already been overgrown with bush and thicket. For this reason, its scale was not appreciated and it was not documented until recently.

== Documentation ==
Kweneng' has been difficult to identify from an aerial view due to the dense vegetation covering the ruins. Before using LiDAR imagery, researchers used aerial photographs and Google Earth satellite imagery. Karim Sadr, an archaeology professor at the University of Witwatersrand located in Johannesburg, South Africa, has studied Kweneng using LiDAR imagery and has compared his findings to other researchers who have used aerial photography and Google Earth imagery. In the 1960s, archeologists Revil Mason and Tim Maggs used aerial imagery to map out Kweneng'. Sadr, in collaboration with scholars at many other research institutes, used Google Earth satellite imagery to map out the territory in 2012–2014. In 2015, Sadr and his team used LiDAR to map out Kweneng'. LiDAR uses laser pulses to map the landscape. Laser pulses are able to detect the ground as well as interfering vegetation and objects such as birds. By using the LiDAR survey, Sadr discovered that most of the southern portion of Kweneng' was covered with vegetation while the northern section was more exposed. The LiDAR survey revealed more walls in the southern portion than were previously shown by Google Earth and aerial photography.

== Architectural style ==
Various architectural styles are found at Kweneng’. The oldest styles lie around the edges of the site and are known as "Type N" compounds. These date between the 15th and 16th centuries. Towards the northern end, a technique that dates between the 17th and 18th centuries is common. The most common architectural technique dates between the mid-18th to the mid-19th centuries.

Kweneng' contained three major clusters. The western-most cluster of enclosed walls is predicted to be the original site of Kweneng'. It is the largest of the three sites. The eastern-most cluster of enclosed walls appears to be the first section added to the original Kweneng' since it appears to have housed the second most people. The northern cluster appears to be the most recent addition to Kweneng' since it is the smallest. Because of Kweneng's growing population, the second and third clusters within Kweneng' were built.

== Archaeology ==
Aerial photographs taken by the South African government in the 1960s demonstrated the ruins. Recent studies by archaeologists used aerial photographs, Google Earth imagery and LIDAR (Light amplification and Ranging) imagery to document the site revealing its true scale. The ruins of the city include hundreds of households, an extensive meeting place, several stone-walled compounds and a market place. Evidence of long-distance trade as far as central and southern Africa exists. Between 800 and 900 compounds have been found at Kweneng’, leading to an estimated population between 5000 and 10,000 people at the peak of habitation in the early 19th century. The inhabitants appear to have placed great value in cattle as two large enclosures which could have held nearly 1000 cattle are present at the site. Stone walled corridors to guide the cattle are also present. Large middens have been found at the entrances of homesteads, a status symbol signifying the wealth of the homestead.

While exploring Kweneng', Sadr and his team found eroded stones which were once walls. These stones formed houses for the civilians, fences for the cattle and a protective barrier around the city. It was assumed that the roofs of the houses were made from something other than stone such as wood or thatch because roofs were not present at the ruins. His team also found stone towers used for grain storage bins or look out posts. The team found clay pots and beads left by the civilization.

== Culture ==
It is well established that Tswana people lived at Kweneng'. Tswana culture is known for having a legal system with courts, mediators, and punishments for those found guilty, like other Sotho-Tswana cultures. Many Tswana people were farmers. Usually, farming was regulated by the leaders of the city. Tswana groups were often open to foreigners and engaged in trade with them. When Tswana people became sick, one of their remedies was consulting ngak, a traditional healer. Tswana people engaged in many artistic activities such as beadwork, basket weaving, wood working, dancing, and singing.

Cattle were valued by people at Kweneng'. Oftentimes, cattle were only eaten on special occasions such as welcoming somebody, marriages, and rituals. One of the features found at the ruins of Kweneng' were piles of ash from cow dung, cow bones, and broken pottery. Bigger piles represented wealthier populations. Also, the wealthier tended to live in areas with more houses in order to support larger families. Another common ritual was the burial of important figures underneath walls of cattle enclosures.

== Significance ==
Given the lack of written accounts of pre-colonial South Africa, this site is important as it attests to the socio-political organisation and economy of the people who inhabited South Africa prior to the arrival of Europeans.

== See also ==
- Other ruins in South Africa
  - Blaauboschkraal stone ruins in Mpumalanga
  - Machadodorp baKoni Ruins in Mpumalanga
  - Dzata ruins in Limpopo
  - Kaditshwene in North West province
  - Mapungubwe in Limpopo
  - Sedan Beehive stone huts in Free State
  - Tlokwe Ruins in Gauteng
- Similar ruins outside South Africa
  - Bumbusi in Zimbabwe
  - Danangombe in Zimbabwe
  - Engaruka in Arusha Region, Tanzania
  - Khami in Zimbabwe
  - Leopard's Kopje
  - Manyikeni – in Mozambique
  - Mapela, Zimbabwe
  - Naletale in Zimbabwe
  - Thimlich Ohinga stone ruins in Migori County, Kenya
  - Toutswemogala Hill in Botswana
  - Ziwa in Zimbabwe
