= Dzata =

Dzata Ruins
- Dzata Ruins
- 22°52′S 30°09′E
- Type: Ruins
- Periods: AD 1700
- Cultures: Venda kingdom
- Location: Makhado Local Municipality, Vhembe district, Limpopo, South Africa

History
- Abandoned: 1760

The Dzata Ruins (or Dzana ruins), an archaeological site in Dzanani in the Makhado municipality, Vhembe district, in the north of South Africa, is one of the national monuments in South Africa. It was the capital of the Venda kingdom in the 18th century.

Scholars who have made a study of the various legends and traditions associated with the ruins, find it clear that they are many contradictions. Archaeological evidence has shed some lights on these events, but a great deal of work still remains to be done. It is certain that Dzata was built at an earlier date than many people are willing to admit. Radiocarbon dates suggest a beginning shortly after AD 1700, with an end some 50 to 60 years later.

Documentary proof of this is found in Dutch records, which refer to an interview in 1730 with an African by the name of Mahumane, who had visited the kingdom of Thovhele some five years previously. Mahumane described a settlement built of dark-blue stone, with a wall enclosing the whole area. He also mentioned that the chief cities are made of the same stone. To date no stone-walled settlement has been found that is made of dark blue stone, other than Dzata. There is no doubt that Dzata was the capital of united Venda.

It is not clear what the role of the legendary Thohoyandou was at this stage. It is highly unlikely that he could remain chief throughout this period of a minimum of 50 years that Dzata was the capital. Oral history indicates very strongly that it was after the disappearance of Thohoyandou that Dzata was abandoned, and the Venda nation fragmented once more into independent chiefdoms. It seems very likely that Thohoyandou expanded the Venda empire to cover areas as far south as the Olifants River near Phalaborwa. No doubt trade played an important role in this.

== See also ==
- Other ruins in South Africa
  - Blaauboschkraal stone ruins in Mpumalanga
  - Machadodorp baKoni Ruins in Mpumalanga
  - Kaditshwene in North West province
  - Kweneng' Ruins in Gauteng
  - Mapungubwe in Limpopo
  - Sedan Beehive stone huts in Free State
  - Tlokwe Ruins in Gauteng
- Similar ruins outside South Africa
  - Bumbusi in Zimbabwe
  - Danangombe in Zimbabwe
  - Engaruka in Arusha Region, Tanzania
  - Khami in Zimbabwe
  - Leopard's Kopje
  - Manyikeni – in Mozambique
  - Naletale in Zimbabwe
  - Thimlich Ohinga stone ruins in Migori County, Kenya
  - Ziwa in Zimbabwe
- Venda
