= Kingdom of Mapungubwe =

Ancient kingdom in the Limpopo-Shashe Basin, northern South Africa

- c. 1220–c. 1300
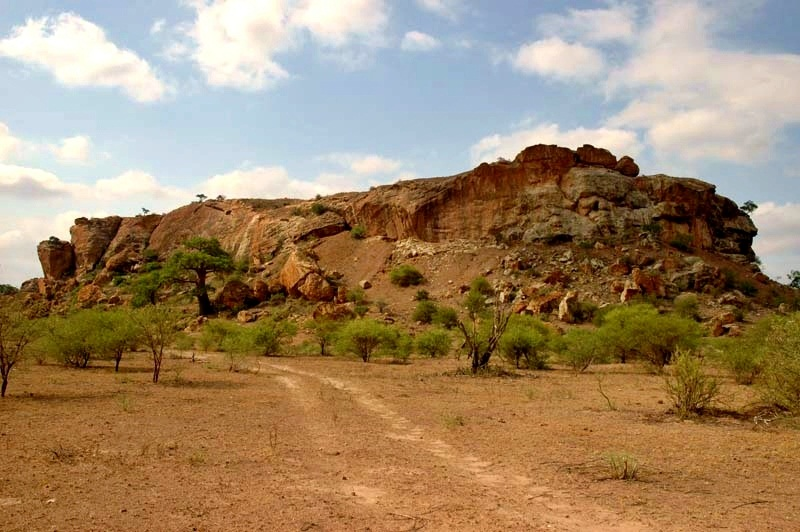
- Mapungubwe Hill
- Capital: Mapungubwe Hill
- Government: Monarchy
- Mambo
  - c. 1220 – c. ?: Shiriyadenga (according to some Venda traditions)
  - c. ? – c. 1300: Tshidziwelele (according to some Venda traditions)
- History
  - Established: c. 1220
  - Mapungubwe Hill abandoned: c. 1300

Area
  - Total: 30,000 km^{2} (12,000 sq mi)
Preceded by	Succeeded by
Bambandyanalo; Leopard's Kopje	Kingdom of Great Zimbabwe
- Today part of: South Africa, Zimbabwe

Mapungubwe Cultural Landscape
UNESCO World Heritage Site
- Location within Limpopo Location within South Africa
- Location: Limpopo, South Africa
- Criteria: Cultural: (ii), (iii), (iv), (v)
- Reference: 1099bis
- Inscription: 2003 (27th Session)
- Extensions: 2014
- Area: 281.686602 km^{2} (69,606 acres)
- Buffer zone: 1,048 km^{2} (259,000 acres)
- Coordinates: 22°11′33″S 29°14′20″E

The Kingdom of Mapungubwe (pronounced /mɑːˈpuːnɡuːbweɪ/ mah-POON-goob-weh) was an ancient (Note: Ancient as a time period is relative to the region. Sources that refer to Mapungubwe as ancient:) state located at the confluence of the Shashe and Limpopo rivers in present day South Africa, south of Great Zimbabwe. The capital's population was 5,000 by 1250, and the state likely covered 30,000 km^{2} (12,000 sq mi).

Around 1000 CE, some Leopard's Kopje people moved across the Limpopo to Bambandyanalo where they practiced agropastoralism, moving large cattle herds to other communities' grazing land which fostered socio-political relations, while also engaging in the Indian Ocean trade via Swahili city-states on the East African coast. Over the centuries, increased wealth among the growing population produced inequalities for which Bambandyanalo's spatial arrangement was unsuited.

Around 1220, amid a dry period, the Mapungubwe elite moved to settle the top of Mapungubwe Hill, followed by the population who settled the surrounding land below. Hills often served as rainmaking sites, and Mapungubwe Hill became the sole such site; its habitation by the leader was substantial in the development of sacred kingship. A large amount of wealth was accumulated via tributes, facilitated by the Limpopo-Shashe confluence being a trade centre, and ivory and gold was exported to the east coast. Following unknown events and shifting trade routes north around 1300, Mapungubwe's population migrated elsewhere. In the present day they are often associated with the Kalanga (Shona) and Venda peoples.

Despite locals having knowledge of the sacred site, Mapungubwe was only rediscovered by the scientific community and colonial government in 1933. The Mapungubwe Collection of artefacts found at the archaeological site is housed in the Mapungubwe Museum in Pretoria. The site is located in the Mapungubwe National Park in South Africa, on the border with Zimbabwe and Botswana. Although traditionally assumed to have been the first state in Southern Africa, excavations in the same region at Mapela Hill show evidence for sacral kingship nearly 200 years earlier.

== Etymology ==
Its original name is not known. The site was called Mapungubwe following archaeological naming conventions, (Note: Sites are often given the name of the farm on which they're found, or another local name.) and this was extended to the kingdom. Mapungubwe means "a place of (many) jackals". In various Bantu languages, "-pungubwe" refers to jackals. "Jackal" is phunguwe in Venda, while in Northern Sotho it is phukubje.

== Geography ==
The area surrounding Mapungubwe, near the Limpopo River, is today dry and experiences low rainfall. It comprises sandstone hills, Kalahari sands, and scrubland. From 1000 CE to 1200 CE, the area saw higher rainfall, facilitating growth in vegetation which brought with it animals such as warthogs, wildebeests, and buffalo (as well as tsetse flies). Flooding from the Limpopo dispersed nutrients throughout the floodplain, including in the Mapungubwe Valley which had soils ranging from sandy to clay, meaning farming could be practised all year round.

== History ==
=== Origins ===
The wider region was inhabited by the San for some 100,000 years. Early San society left a rich legacy of cave paintings across Southern Africa. Bantu-speakers inhabited the Shashe-Limpopo Basin for a period between 350 and 450 CE. The origins of the Kingdom of Mapungubwe lie in Leopard's Kopje, an archaeological culture in modern-day Zimbabwe.

==== Schroda (900–1000) ====
Motivated by the ivory trade, some Zhizo people moved south around 900 to settle Schroda, near the Limpopo River. The San were largely driven off their ancestral lands. The Zhizo herded cattle and engaged in farming. They traded and possibly hunted with the San, who lived in different settlements. Schroda was likely the Zhizo's capital due to being the most populated (around 500). The chief was the wealthiest, and accumulated cattle through court fines, forfeits, tributes, raids, and the high price of marrying one of his daughters. The Zhizo made elaborate pottery with diverse styles, for which they were named after. Figurines were used as props in school lessons. They traded ivory, gold, rhino skins, leopard skins, and iron to coastal cities such as Chibuene in exchange for glass beads, cotton and silk cloths, and glazed ceramics.

==== K2 (1000–1220) ====
Around 1000, some Leopard's Kopje people moved south to settle Bambandyanalo (known as K2, situated beneath Bambandyanalo Hill), as the Zhizo moved west to settle Toutswe in modern day Botswana. Some scholars believe their relations to have been hostile and characterised by military conflict, however others insist they were more complex, both socially and politically. Their arrival coincided with the onset of a wet period, which greatly increased agricultural yield. Leopard's Kopje people spoke an early form of Shona, likely Kalanga (western Shona). K2 was the capital, and was likely divided into residential areas under the authority of a family head, with the chief having the largest area. Women worked copper, while men worked iron.

They cultivated sorghum, pearl millet, finger millet, ground beans, and cowpeas. To make more productive use of the land, cattle were herded away from the capital and permitted to graze on other communities' land, fostering socio-political relations with those communities while also allowing for bigger herds. The population expanded, and K2 housed 1,500 people by 1200. Rainmaking was widespread, and the chief sometimes hired strangers who were believed to have special relationships with the spirits of the land, such as the San, due to their longer habitation. Likewise some Zhizo who remained at Leokwe (likely subordinate to K2) specialised in rituals also due to their longer habitation.

Thomas Huffman wrote that the large amount of wealth generated by the Indian Ocean trade created unprecedented inequalities, as the society evolved from being based on social ranking to social classes, with an immense gap in status emerging between the ruling class and commoners. Accordingly K2's spatial arrangement became unsuited to this development. Mark Horton however argued that the East African interior benefited much less from long-distance trade than the coastal Swahili city-states (possibly due to the Swahili monopoly over trade), and Shadreck Chirikure et al. have pointed to the economy (and possibly the rulers' legitimacy) as having been based in agropastoralism. Meanwhile, scholars Nam Kim and Chapurukha Kusimba have attributed this process of state formation to agricultural innovations, cattle accumulation, and use of ritual power.

=== Mapungubwe Hill (1220–1300) ===
Map of trade centres and routes on the Zimbabwean Plateau

Around 1200 the wet period ended. Amid a harsh drought which likely troubled the society, royal elites moved the capital to Mapungubwe (an old rainmaking site) and settled its flat-topped summit around 1220, while most people settled at the foot of Mapungubwe Hill. It is possible the old village was burnt down to make way for a new one. Mapungubwe Hill became the sole rainmaking hill, and its habitation by the leader emphasised a link between himself and rainmaking, which was substantial in the development of sacral kingship. The hill had been inhabited by the San long ago and a rock shelter on the east side featured some of their art.

The first king ("Shiriyadenga" in some Venda oral traditions) would have spent most of his time in ritual seclusion, and had his palace on the western part of the hill; it included a room where the king could receive visitors, and another where the visitors could be vetted, as well as a hut for the king's special diviner. By 1250, Mapungubwe had a population of 5000, with settlements all around the hill, forming a protective circle. The second king ("Tshidziwelele" in some Venda traditions) had his palace in the middle of the hill, with the same arrangements as his predecessor, however his visitor room was divided so as to separate visitors from the king, who would have spoken through an intermediary. Kings had many wives, with some living outside of the capital to help maintain the network of alliances. The administration and structure of the state is unclear, though scholars consider it to have been similar to that of the Pedi Kingdom.

The economy was based on agriculture, and cattle continued to be herded away from the capital and permitted to graze on other communities' land, forming social and political ties and increasing Mapungubwe's influence. A large amount of wealth was accumulated via tributes, which were paid in crops, animals, and sometimes rarer goods. Copper, gold, and tin were not found in the Limpopo-Shashe Basin, and Mapungubwe likely derived them from tribute or trade, facilitated by the Limpopo-Shashe confluence being a trade centre. It is unclear to what extent coercion and conflict played in Mapungubwe's growth and dominance due to this being challenging to recognise archaeologically. While the stone walls served a symbolic purpose in the separation of elites and commoners, they possibly also served a defensive purpose, indicating warfare was conventional. Kim and Kusimba, along with Simon Hall, have argued that coercion and violence would have been key to maintaining state power. Mapungubwe traded locally with Toutswe and Eiland among others, and gold and ivory were exported to the Indian Ocean trade via Sofala.

It is unknown what caused Mapungubwe's collapse. (Note: It has previously been attributed to drastic climatic change amid the Little Ice Age; however this has since been disproven.) Elizabeth Anne Voigt proposed that cattle may have caused land degradation amid droughts, while David Killick and Christopher Ehret say that during the 13th century, Kilwa and Mogadishu replaced Manda and Shanga as the major ports. Under Kilwan influence, Sofala became the centre of the gold trade and had direct access to the gold-producing Zimbabwean Plateau, side-lining Mapungubwe. Chirikure et al. say that trade routes shifted north as traders travelled to reach the gold-producing interior, which would have dramatically hurt Mapungubwe's economy. Accordingly, the lack of imported goods would have caused Mapungubwe's political relations to break down, which depended on exchanging goods and services for grazing land. They speculate that confidence was lost in the leadership amid the deepening material and spiritual divide between commoners and the king (and possibly high tribute demands), causing a breakdown in common purpose, and provoking people to "vote with their feet". The basin was abandoned as people scattered northwest and south. They didn't regroup. To the north, Great Zimbabwe, on the fringe of the Mapungubwe state and with a distinct population, rose to become its successor, adopting the same elitist spatial arrangement and sacred leadership.

== Culture and society ==
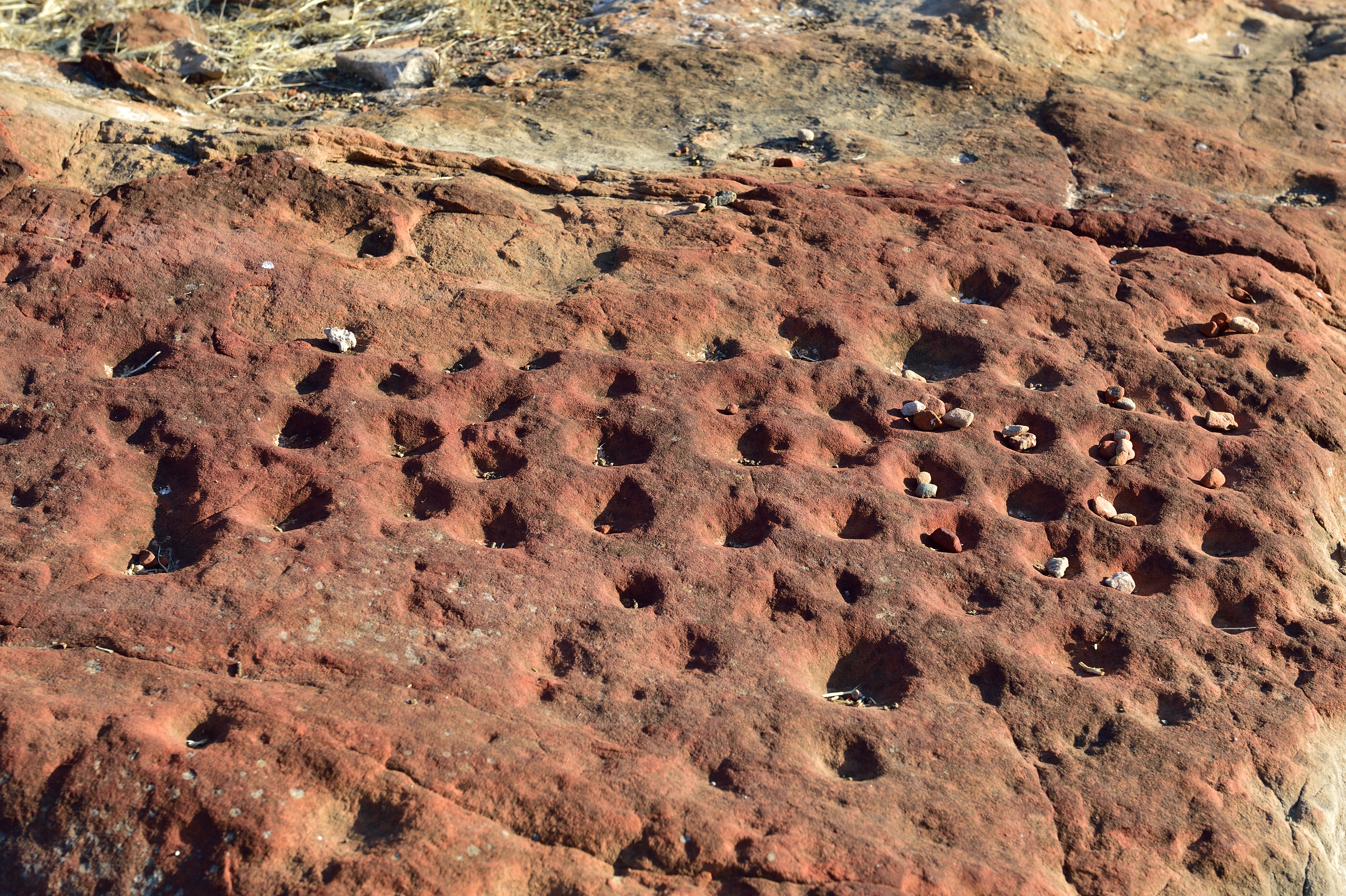
A mufuvha (mancala) game board at the main complex of Mapungubwe.

Over the course of settlement at K2, their society transitioned from a society based on social ranking to one based on social classes, and was one of the first class-based social systems and examples of sacral kingship in southern Africa. The leader and elites inhabited the hilltop, with the population below. There were four paths up the hill, with the main one guarded by soldiers, who were called the "eye" of the king. Settlements were divided into residential areas under the authority of family heads, and surrounded the hill, forming a protective circle. The kingdom was likely divided into a five-tiered hierarchy due to the wide spread of the population; family heads, headmen, petty chiefs, senior chiefs, and the king.

The king slept in a small wooden hut, in a supposedly secret location. Visitors were secluded from the king. His entourage included soldiers and praise singers, along with musicians who played mbiras and xylophones. His actions were ritualised, such that, if he sneezed, a praise singer would tell everyone. Wives were viewed as a route to success and status, and as such the king had many, with the senior wife in charge. Some wives lived outside of the capital, to help maintain the network of alliances.

Mapungubwe followed a settlement pattern common across Southern Africa called the "Central Cattle Pattern". The centre of the settlement was the domain of men, and had an area for resolving disputes and making political decisions as well as cattle kraals, while the outer zone was the domain of women, containing domestic complexes. Life in Mapungubwe was centred on family and farming. Special sites were created for initiation ceremonies, household activities, and other social functions. Cattle lived in kraals located close to the residents' houses, signifying their value. Courts belonged to the leader, however he would not have been there, but rather in ritual seclusion on the hilltop. A brother would have likely been in charge, and would have been the second most powerful person in the kingdom.

Scholars have drawn from work on other precolonial South African societies and highlighted the likelihood of intergenerational tension, due to young people being burdened with most of the labour, though were not able to own cattle or land until marriage. Only men of high status were allowed to smelt and work copper and gold. These metals were associated with power, wealth, and fertility, and only elites would have possessed gold. While most had access to iron tools, poorer farmers made use of stone and bone tools. Men were buried in kraals, while women were buried outside of them.

Elites within the kingdom were buried in hills. Royal wives lived in their own area away from the king. Important men maintained prestigious homes on the outskirts of the capital. This type of spatial division occurred first at Mapungubwe but would be replicated in later Butua and Rozwi states. The growth in population at Mapungubwe may have led to full-time specialists in ceramics, specifically pottery. Gold objects were uncovered in elite burials on the royal hill.

=== Rainmaking ===
Rainmaking, or rain control, intended to affect the coming of rain and prevent both droughts and floods. It was based on the belief that humans could influence nature, spirits, or the ancestors who withheld or brought rain. The San, who were believed to have closer connections to the old spirits of the land, were often turned to by other societies for rainmaking. San shamans would enter a trance and go into the spirit world themselves to capture the animals associated with rain. The community at K2 chose the San rather than the Zhizo, their political rivals, because the San did not believe in ancestors, and by not acknowledging the Zhizo's ancestors they would not be held to ransom by them. Hilltops with streams at their base were used as rainmaking sites, including a site called Ratho Kroonkop. As the society became more complex, houses and shrines were built on hills, with the practice becoming institutionalised. At Mapungubwe, the elite tried to change the place of practice from a group of hills to one; Mapungubwe Hill, with the royal family the ritual specialists, signifying a step away from the role of ancestors.

== Economy ==
Mapungubwe's economy was predominantly based on agropastoralism. The region, being semi-arid, was far from ideal for agriculture, necessitating the herding of cattle away from fields during crop season (despite their social importance). This reduced stress on the land and allowed the keeping of larger herds, maximising productivity. Fluctuating rainfall also posed challenges that were overcome. Textiles and ceramics were produced at Mapungubwe, along with ivory products such as bracelets, while K2 produced cloth and glass roller beads. The metal industry (locally-developed) involved smelting and forging iron, copper, gold, brass, and bronze. Most metals were imported from nearby regions, whether by tribute or trade (gold likely came from the Tati goldfields in modern-day Botswana and from southwestern modern-day Zimbabwe). Goods that were produced included chisels, adzes, axes, and arrowheads, along with jewellery.

Mapungubwe traded locally with Toutswe and Eiland among others. A major source of their wealth came from the Indian Ocean trade. An early link was with Chibuene. After Chibuene burnt down, Sofala became the main trading port, which was frequented by Arab merchants due to higher demand for gold from the 10th century as various Muslim, European, and Indian states issued gold coinage. Though not navigable itself, traders followed the Limpopo River inland. Mapungubwe exported gold and ivory, while a large number of glass beads were imported from India and Southeast Asia and used as currency. The Chinese celadon found at the palace would have likely been a gift for allowing foreigners to trade. Beads were intentionally made rarer by combining several to make large beads ("garden rollers"), increasing their value and prestige.

The effect of trade on Mapungubwe is unclear; scholars such as Thomas Huffman have attributed the formation of the state to long-distance trade said to have facilitated the large gap in status between the ruling class and commoners, though others such as Shadreck Chirikure et al. have pointed to the economy (and possibly the rulers' legitimacy) as having been based in agropastoralism. Scholars such as Richard Pearson have applied dependency theory and argued that the exporting of raw materials would have underdeveloped Mapungubwe; other scholars such as David Killick have said that there lacks the data to determine whether there was or wasn't unequal exchange or dependency. Mark Horton and others have argued that the East African interior benefited much less from long-distance trade than the coastal Swahili city-states, possibly due to the Swahili monopoly over trade.

== Stone masonry ==
Spatial organisation in the Mapungubwe, termed dzimbahwe in Shona, involved the use of stone walls to demarcate important areas, embedding class distinction and providing ritual seclusion for the king. There was a stone-walled residence likely occupied by the principal councillor. Stone and wood were used together. There would have also been a wooden palisade surrounding Mapungubwe Hill. Most of the capital's population would have lived inside the western wall.

== Royal burials ==
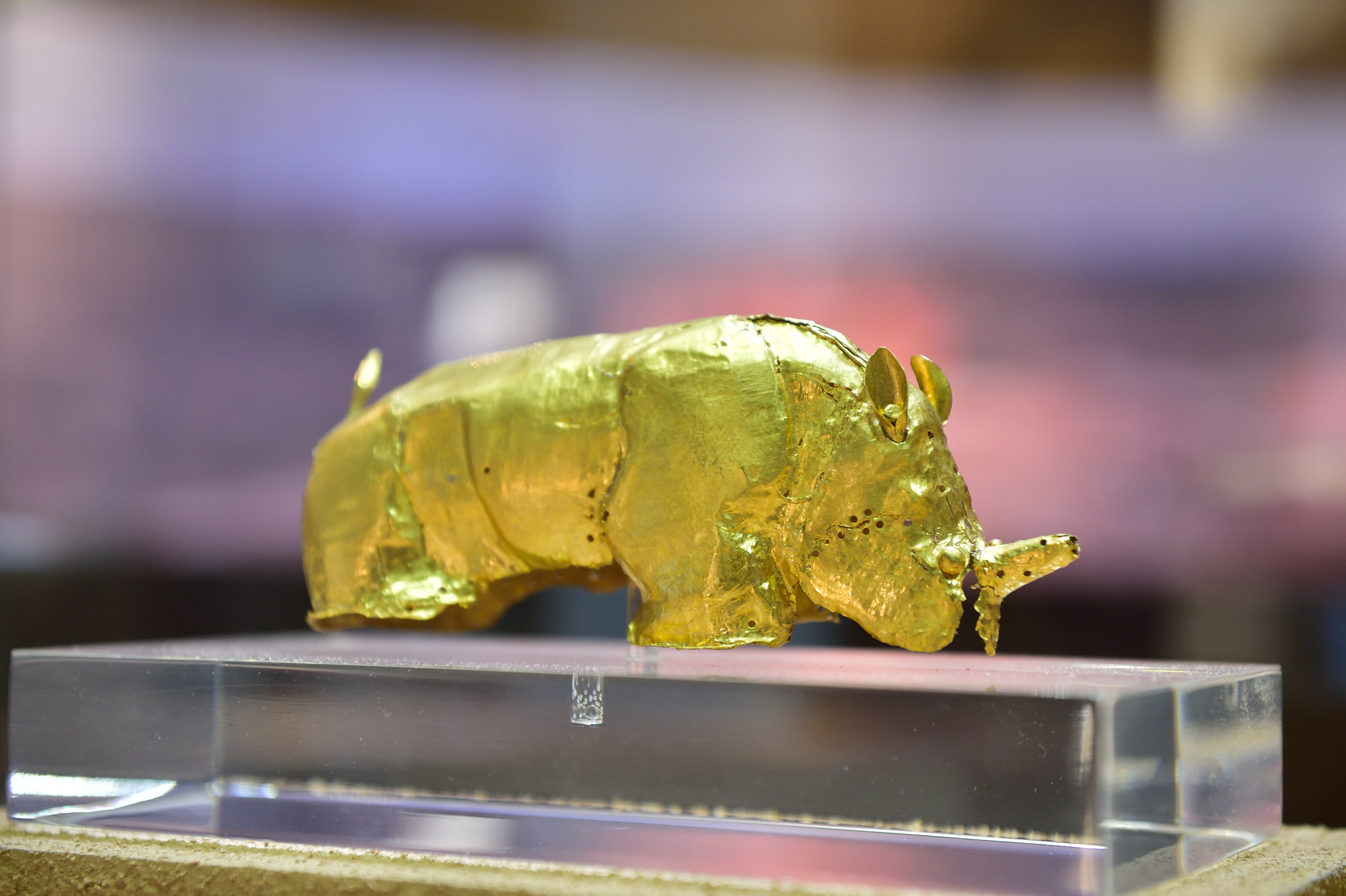
The Golden Rhinoceros of Mapungubwe

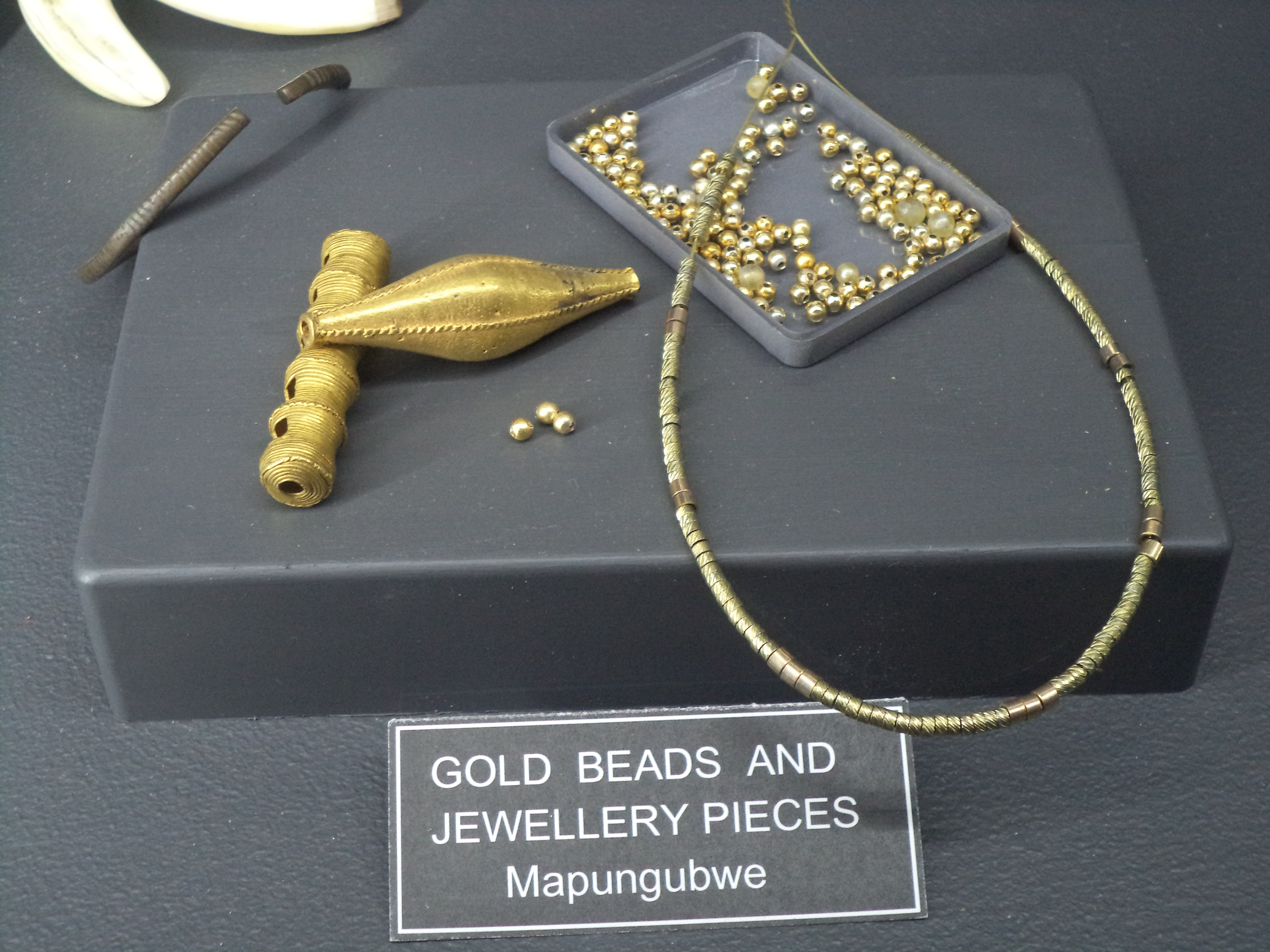
Gold beads and jewellery found at Mapungubwe

In the 1930s a major cemetery was uncovered nearby the palace, which housed 23 graves. Most were buried with few or no accessories, with most adults buried with glass beads, however three were different. The first, known as the original gold burial, was buried with a wooden headrest and three objects all made from wood covered in gold foil; a divining bowl, a sceptre (likely a knobkerrie), and a rhino. (Note: The white rhino is docile and harmless, while the black rhino is more aggressive, known for its dangerous behaviour, unpredictability, and solitary life, coming to be associated with sacred leaders.) The second, likely a woman, was buried facing west with over 100 gold bangles, 12,000 gold beads, and 26,000 glass beads. The third, likely a tall middle-aged man, was also buried facing west, and with a necklace of gold beads and cowrie shells, and various objects covered in gold foil, including a crocodile.

In 2007, the South African Government gave the green light for the skeletal remains that were excavated in 1933 to be reburied on Mapungubwe Hill in a ceremony that took place on 20 November 2007.

== Population ==
=== Diet and lifestyle ===
Skeletal Analysis has been done on the people of Mapungubwe to learn about their health and lifestyle. Findings include that the populations at Mapungubwe experienced mortality rates expected for a pre-industrial group (comparable to pre-industrial Europeans), with high mortality at youth but an expected 35–40 year life-span after adulthood is reached. Another finding is that the people of Mapungubwe grew well, without a notable frequency of chronic infections, though children sometimes were found with anaemia.

=== Ethnic affiliation ===
Mapungubwe's population is thought to be the ancestors of the Kalanga people (a Shona sub-group).

The site is claimed by the Vhavenda, most notably by the Tshivhula clans of Sembola and Machete (Venda identity formed between the 15th and 17th centuries from an amalgamation of Kalanga, Shona, and Sotho). While both have historical ties to the area, Mokoko Piet Sebola writes that they are possibly incentivised by the land claims process initiated by the South African government, which has seen various groups dishonestly claim land. He concludes that there isn't sufficient evidence to support ancestral links to the site for either of them, nor for other clans.

Mapungubwe's population are regarded as the "cultural ancestors" of the Shona and Venda. According to one account of Venda oral traditions, the kings Shiriyadenga and Tshidziwelele reigned from Mapungubwe Hill before being replaced by Vele Lambeu, however this is disputed. Other traditions say that Tshidziwelele was a ruler who preceded the Netshiendeulu at Tshiendeulu Mountain in the Soutpansberg.

==== Genetics ====
Skeletal analysis of craniometric traits (ie: traits on the skull) have been used to infer the genetic relationship between the people of Mapungubwe and other populations. Early analysis by Galloway, 1939/1957 saw affinities between the people of Mapungubwe and samples taken from 'Khoisanid' samples, and thus classed the Mapungubwe population as 'racially Boskop' (Khoisan), perhaps even with additional 'Caucasoid' traits. This became a controversial classification, particularly because (as discussed above), the material culture finds from the site are largely in line with known contemporary Iron-Age Bantu practices. Re-analysis of Galloway's remains is difficult because of poor preservation practice on his skulls, but subsequent analysis on other finds has demonstrated that the majority of those samples from Mapungubwe which were not damaged by poor storage or vulnerable to destruction fall within a general range to be expected of "Bantu" groups. Analysis by Rightmire 1970 found that, measuring cranial length, glabella protrusion, nasion-basion (nose bridge) length, alveolare-basion length, and a number of other traits (35 in total), the six "K2 Crania" (Rightmire treats K2 alongside Bambandyanalo and Mapungubwe) all clearly fall outside of the range for "Bushman" (San?) samples, and four clearly fall out of the range of "Hottentot" samples. Two aside, "the rest are firmly within the range of expected modern Bantu variation...". Concluding, he reasons the idea that:

Bambandyanalo and Mapungubwe people be viewed as representative of a "large Khoisan" (i.e., Hottentot) population seems to have missed the mark... [as] there is no basis for continued emphasis on these remains as pre- or non-Negro and hence no necessity to "explain" the K2 (Leopard's Kopje) material culture as "taken over"...

Analysis by Steyn 1997 found that tooth samples (dental samples being the main kind studied in her piece) were more similar to samples from K2, which had been classed as "Southern African Negro", than San samples.

K2 and Mapungubwe teeth thus probably come from a single population that, although not identical, is broadly similar to the modem 'South African Negro

The reasons for this confusion are manifold. Firstly, the exceedingly small sample size available means results are liable to coincidental bias (ie: a particularly unique set of individuals is taken as representative of the whole). Secondly, craniometric analysis is generally liable to issues of measurement and interpretation; it has long been known that depending on measured criteria and implicated populations, one may read traits 'of' one population into another. Thirdly, many scholars note that the assumption of uniform differentiation between members of Khoisan and Bantu populations through physiological analysis is complicated by the fact that Southern African populations have long been acknowledged to carry mixed traits and to have interacted, and because, as Steyn puts it, "the typological approach, whereby an individual is described by reference to an ideal' individual possessing all the main features of a specific race, is now totally outdated." This does not mean, however, that broad 'cluster' differences cannot be ascertained and worked within, as Rightmire 1970 argued by asserting sufficient criteria could, with a very high level of confidence, discern between its set of analyzed Khoisan and "Southern African Negro" samples, and a similar argument was forwarded in Franklin & Freedman 2006. Even in this case, Rightmire & Merwe 1976 demonstrate that with such differentiation, unexpected finds are not unheard of; their analysis determined one of two burials analyzed for the paper were more comfortably fitted among "Hottentots" than "Bantus", with the best Bantu fit being their Venda samples. In either case, actual genetic analysis of the past two decades (as opposed to physiological analysis inferring genetic relationships) supports notable, sometimes even substantial, mixture between Khoisan and Southern African Bantu populations in history, that is reflected in modern Khoisan and Bantu peoples. Finally is the very assumption that craniometric OR genetic analysis can by themselves accurately pinpoint ethno-linguistic identities and boundaries of historic peoples, something considered by Brothwell 1963 as often problematic, as there exist Khoisan populations with almost entirely 'non-Khoisan' associated ancestry, and some Xhosa samples apparently had a majority non-Xhosa ancestry.

== Rediscovery and historiography ==
Locals had knowledge of the site through their oral histories, and considered the site sacred and imbued with the power and presence of ancestral kings, warned by their traditions against visiting or even pointing at the hill. In the 19th century Frans Lotrie (of either German or Dutch ancestry) went travelling across the subcontinent and was known as "Wild Lottering", later settling near the Limpopo. In the early 20th century, the Van Graans, who were farmers in the Mopane District, heard a legend of "a white man gone wild, who had lived a hermit's life in a cave on the banks of the Limpopo" and had "climbed the sacred hill and found things there". After several years of searching for the treasure, in 1933 they coerced an unnamed local African guide and set out again with a team. The African guide, according to an archaeologist writing in 1937, "was literally shivering with fright and had to be forcibly detained before pointing out the secret path up the hill". They uncovered pottery fragments and artefacts of copper, glass, and gold, and the burial of a highly decorated person.

The Van Graans did not declare everything they found. The younger Van Graan, a former student of the University of Pretoria, reported the discovery to the aforementioned archaeologist. The University of Pretoria, at the time an exclusively Afrikaner institution, gained the rights to the treasure, and the Hertzog government monopolised the site. The discovery contradicted the white supremacist myth that Africa was a 'dark' and 'backward' continent in need of 'saving', as well as the belief that Afrikaners were "champions of civilisation". As happened similarly with Great Zimbabwe, the government attempted to hide, discredit, and 'protect' the site.

The site was declared a national monument in the 1980s. The study and interpretation of Mapungubwe throughout the 20th century largely excluded local communities, until the post-apartheid era which has seen descendants and locals become much more involved at Mapungubwe.

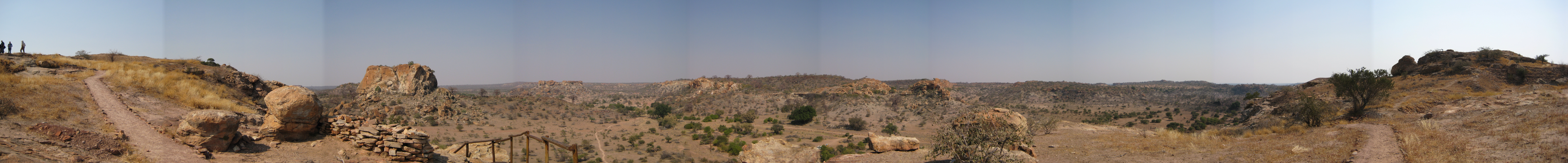
Panorama from the top of Mapungubwe Hill

== Protected areas ==
The area is now part of the Mapungubwe National Park, which in turn is contained in the UNESCO Mapungubwe Cultural Landscape and the Greater Mapungubwe Transfrontier Conservation Area.

The Mapungubwe Cultural Landscape was declared a UNESCO World Heritage Site on 3 July 2003.

== Gallery ==
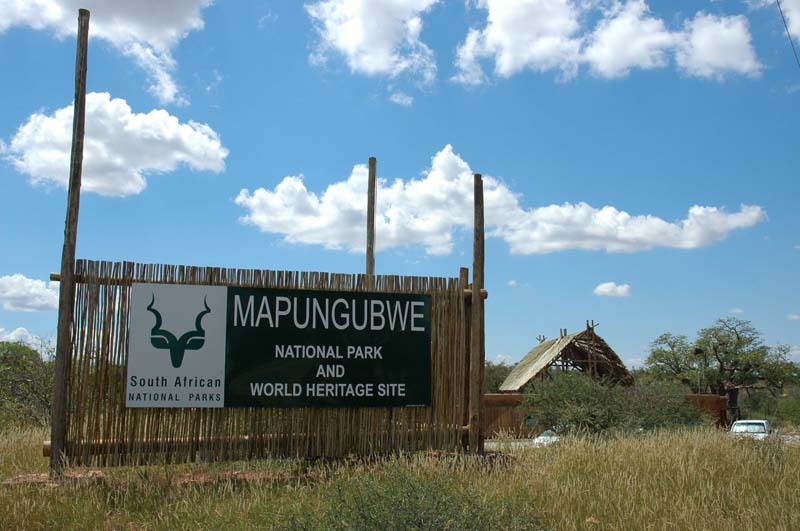
Entrance to Mapungubwe National Park, Limpopo Province, South Africa

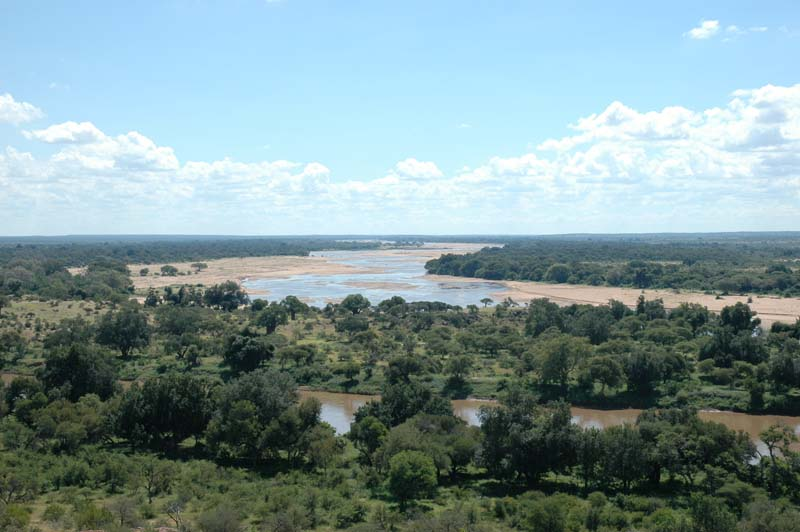
Taken from South Africa, to the left is Botswana and Zimbabwe is on the right. The river running from left to right is the Limpopo River. The river which disappears on the horizon is the Shashe

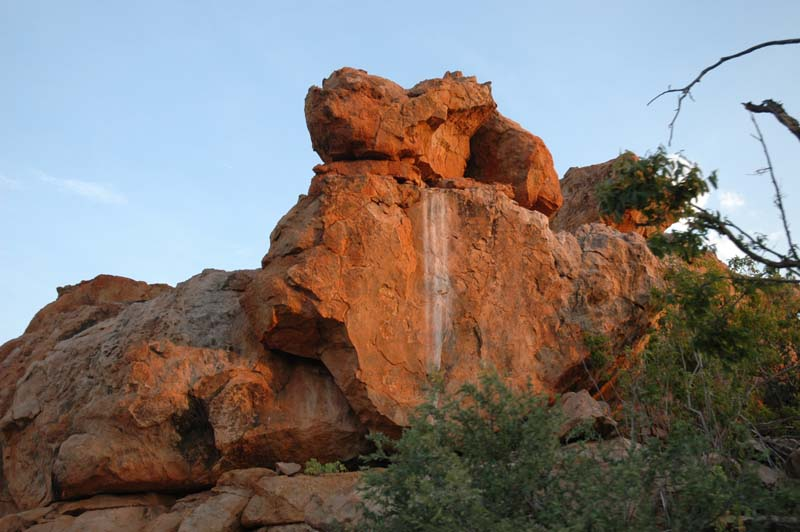
Sandstone rock formations typical of Mapungubwe National Park

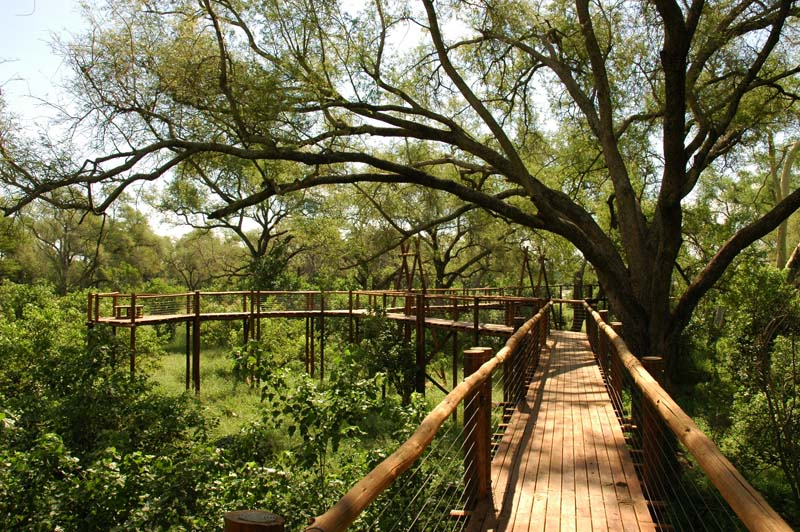
Treetop Boardwalk. All facilities at Mapungubwe National Park are wheelchair-friendly.

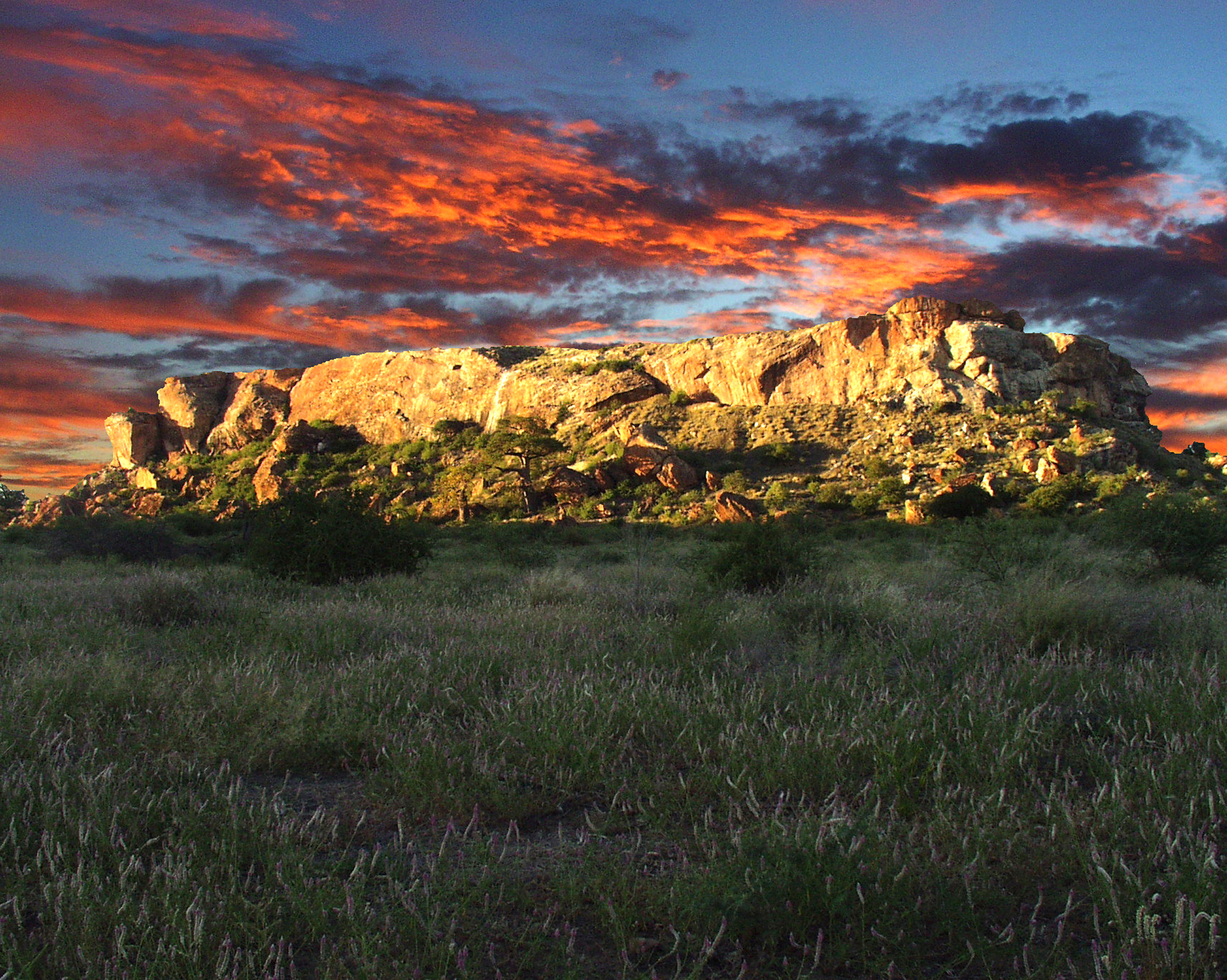
Mapungubwe Hill viewed from the north

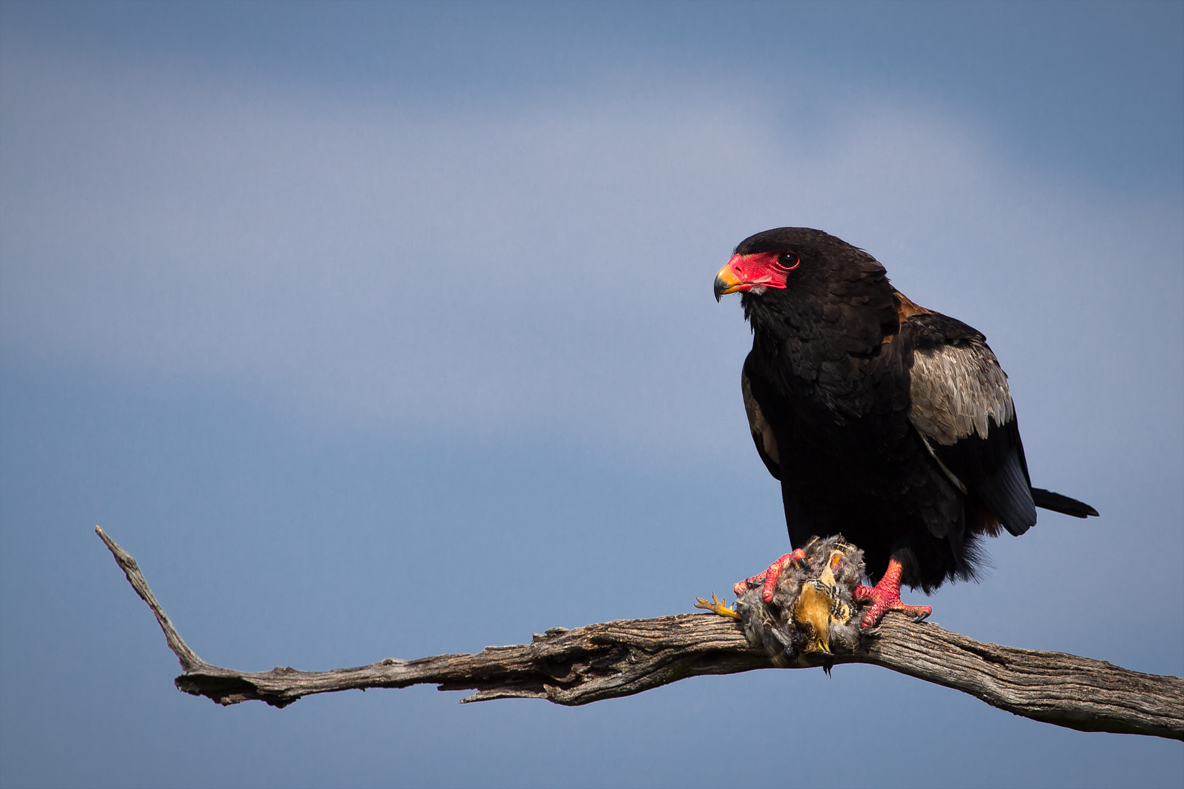
The name may derive from the Shona word for Bateleur eagle

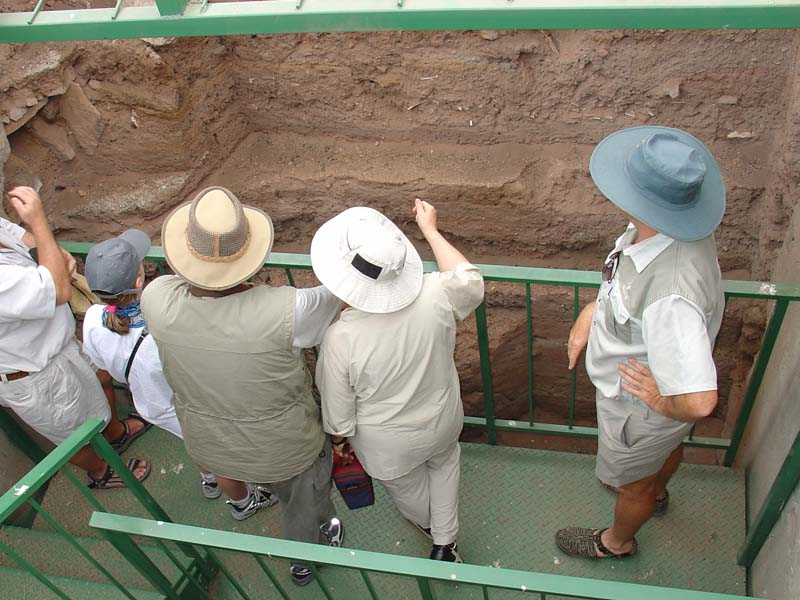
An archaeological excavation site at Mapungubwe.

== See also ==
- Other ruins in South Africa
  - Blaauboschkraal stone ruins in Mpumalanga
  - Machadodorp baKoni Ruins in Mpumalanga
  - Kaditshwene in North West province
  - Kweneng' Ruins in Gauteng
  - Sedan Beehive stone huts in Free State
  - Tlokwe Ruins in Gauteng
  - Thulamela in Kruger National Park, Limpopo
- Similar ruins outside South Africa
  - Bumbusi in Zimbabwe
  - Danangombe in Zimbabwe
  - Engaruka in Tanzania
  - Khami in Zimbabwe
  - Manyikeni in Mozambique
  - Naletale in Zimbabwe
  - Thimlich Ohinga stone ruins in Kenya
  - Ziwa in Zimbabwe
- Mapungubwe Collection
- Order of Mapungubwe

== Sources ==
- Hall, Martin; Rebecca Stefoff (2006). Great Zimbabwe. Oxford: Oxford University Press. pp. 48 pages. ISBN 0-19-515773-7.
- Hrbek, Ivan; Fasi, Muhammad (1988). Africa from the Seventh to the Eleventh Century. London: UNESCO. pp. 869 pages. ISBN 92-3-101709-8.
- Huffman, Thomas (2007). Handbook to the Iron Age: The archaeology of pre-colonial farming societies in southern Africa. Scottsville: University of KwaZulu-Natal Press. pp. 504 pages. ISBN 978-1-86914-108-0.
- Duffey, Sian Tiley-Nel et al. The Art and Heritage Collections of the University of Pretoria.Univ. of Pretoria, 2008.
