= Shadreck Chirikure =

Zimbabwean professor (born 1978)

Shadreck Chirikure FBA
- Born: 1978 (age 47–48); Gutu District, Zimbabwe

Academic background
- Education: University of Zimbabwe; UCL Institute of Archaeology
- Thesis: Iron production in Iron Age Zimbabwe: Stagnation or innovation? (2005)

Academic work
- Discipline: Archaeology
- Sub-discipline: Archaeological science; archaeometallurgy; artefact studies; history of technology
- Institutions: University of Cape Town; School of Archaeology, University of Oxford

Shadreck Chirikure FBA (born 1978) is Edward Hall Professor of Archaeological Science at the University of Oxford where he is Director of the Research Laboratory for Archaeology and the History of Art, School of Archaeology. He holds a British Academy Global Professorship within the same School at Oxford. He is a leading archaeologist, studying ancient materials and technology, human-materials relations and history of technology. He was elected a Fellow of the British Academy in 2024.

== Education ==
Chirikure was born in Gutu District, Zimbabwe, in 1978. He studied for a BA and BA Honours Degrees at the University of Zimbabwe. Subsequently, he studied for an MA in Artefact Studies from the Institute of Archaeology, UCL followed by a PhD in Archaeology. His PhD thesis, received in 2005, was entitled Iron production in Iron Age Zimbabwe: Stagnation or innovation?, supervised by Thilo Rehren and Andrew Reid.

== Career ==
Chirikure is Edward Hall Professor of Archaeological Science and Director of the Research Laboratory for Archaeology and the History of Art, School of Archaeology, University of Oxford where he also holds a British Academy Global Professorship. Chirikure is former professor of archaeology in the University of Cape Town, where he directed the Archaeological Materials Laboratory, a facility dedicated to studies of pyrotechnology as practised by farming communities of the last 2000 years of sub-Saharan Africa. Research undertaken within the laboratory includes the role of mining and metallurgy in early state formation, modelling the evolution of pyrotechnology in sub-Saharan Africa over the past 2000 years, and innovation and demography in the evolution of socio-technical systems. Chirikure studies material from archaeological sites in southern Africa, including Khami, Great Zimbabwe and Mapungubwe, as well as sites in Malawi, Nigeria, and Cameroon.

He held a Mandela-Harvard Fellowship in 2012 at Harvard University's Hutchins Centre for African and African American Studies. He received the National Research Foundation of South Africa's Presidential Award in 2012 for outstanding research by persons under the age of 40. Chirikure received the Association of Commonwealth Universities Fellowship in 2017, which he held at Linacre College, University of Oxford. He currently holds a British Academy Global Professorship within the School of Archaeology at the University of Oxford, and a Visiting Fellow at St Cross College. Chirikure is also an honorary research associate at the McDonald Institute for Archaeological Research. In 2019 he delivered the Thirty-first McDonald Annual Lecture at the University of Cambridge.

He has published several monographs, including Indigenous Mining and Metallurgy in Africa (2010), and Metals in Past Societies. A Global Perspective on Indigenous African Metallurgy (2015), and numerous journal articles. He is the editor in chief of the Oxford Research Encyclopaedia of African Archaeology and one of the co-editors of Cambridge University Press’ History of Technology book series.

Chirikure is a founding member of the South African Young Academy of Science, a Member of the Academy of Science of South Africa, a fellow of the Royal Society of Arts, a former member of the Board of Governors for the Arts Council of African Studies Association, and a former member of the Advisory Council of the New York based Wenner Gren Foundation for Anthropological Research. He won the Antiquity prize in 2019, and in 2008 with Innocent Pikirayi.

== Research focus ==
Much of Chirikure's work is focused on integrating hard sciences with traditional archaeological and anthropological studies, to explore both ancient African technologies and how they contribute to political economies in both non-state and precolonial state systems. Chirikure's work seeks to disrupt the hegemonic approach to African technologies, and their roles in society, using African philosophies to revise historically accepted concepts and reflect on the significance of African technology in the long durée. In his work, Chirikure reflects on how this affects Africa's place in the world now, and the place of the world in Africa, as exemplified in a lecture given as part of AfOx insaka 2019, entitled 'Why is contemporary Africa poor: insights from archaeology and deep history'.

As of 2020, Chirikure's research focused on the precolonial urban landscapes of southern Africa and their relationship to contemporary society. His work centered on the World Heritage Sites of Great Zimbabwe and Mapungubwe. The project examined the economies and social and trade networks of these sites through the scientific analysis of archaeological materials and biological remains, with the aim of improving their chronological framework and understanding their roles in regional and international trade networks.

== Selected publications ==
Chirikure, S. 2007. Metals in society: iron production and its position in Iron Age communities of southern Africa. Journal of Social Archaeology 7(1), 72-100.

Chirikure, S., Pwiti, G., Damm, C., Folorunso, C.A., Hughes, D.M., Phillips, C., Taruvinga, P., Chirikure, S. and Pwiti, G., 2008. Community involvement in archaeology and cultural heritage management: An assessment from case studies in Southern Africa and elsewhere. Current Anthropology 49(3), pp. 467–485.

Chirikure, S., & Pikirayi, I. 2008. Inside and outside the dry stone walls: revisiting the material culture of Great Zimbabwe. Antiquity 82(318), 976-993.

Chirikure, S. 2010. Indigenous mining and metallurgy in Africa. Cambridge : Cambridge University Press.

Chirikure, S., Manyanga, M., Ndoro, W., & Pwiti, G. 2010. Unfulfilled promises? Heritage management and community participation at some of Africa's cultural heritage sites. International Journal of Heritage Studies 16(1-2), 30-44.

Chirikure, S., Manyanga, M., Pikirayi, I., & Pollard, M. (2013). New pathways of sociopolitical complexity in Southern Africa. African Archaeological Review 30(4), 339-366.

Chirikure, S., Manyanga, M., Pollard, A. M., Bandama, F., Mahachi, G., & Pikirayi, I. 2014. Zimbabwe culture before Mapungubwe: new evidence from Mapela Hill, south-western Zimbabwe. PLOS ONE 9(10), e111224.

Chirikure, Shadreck. 2015. Metals in Past Societies. A Global Perspective on Indigenous African Metallurgy. Springer.

Munyaradzi Manyanga and Shadreck Chirikure. 2017. Archives, Objects, Places and Landscapes: Multidisciplinary approaches to Decolonised Zimbabwean pasts. African Books Collective.

Webber Ndoro, Shadreck Chirikure, Janette Deacon (eds). 2018. Managing Africa's Heritage: Who Cares. Routledge.
