= Golden Rhinoceros of Mapungubwe =

Medieval artifact from the Kingdom of Mapungubwe

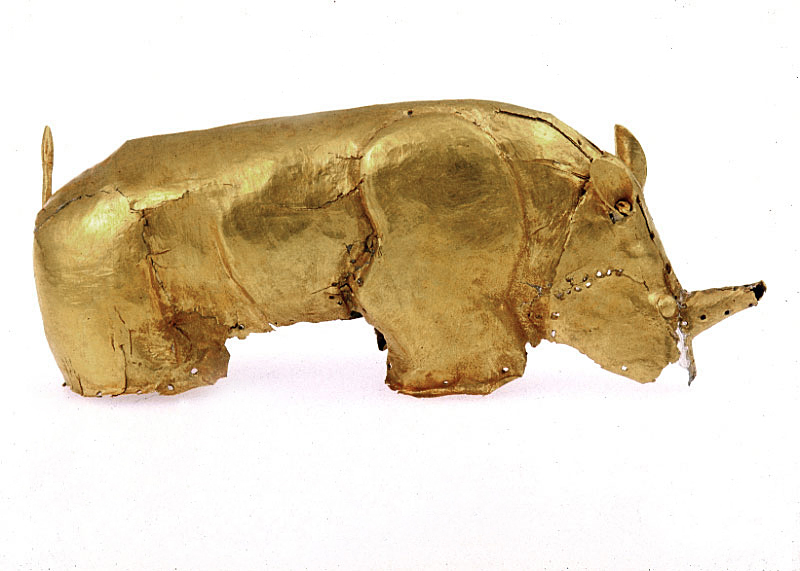
- Golden Rhinoceros of Mapungubwe
- Material: Wood, Gold
- Created: Kingdom of Mapungubwe (1220–1300)
- Discovered: 1932; Kingdom of Mapungubwe (in Mapungubwe National Park, Limpopo, South Africa)
- Present location: Mapungubwe Collection, University of Pretoria Museums

The golden rhinoceros of Mapungubwe is a medieval artifact, made from wood which is covered in thin sheets of gold, from the ancient Kingdom of Mapungubwe, which is located in modern-day South Africa. It was found on a royal grave on Mapungubwe Hill in 1932 by archaeologists from the University of Pretoria. The artifact is described as being "small enough to stand in the palm of your hand."

From 26 October 2016 to 27 February 2017 it was on display at the British Museum as part of an exhibition celebrating the art of South Africa.

The site reveals the existence of a ruling elite, living separately in a hilltop settlement. This is the first known example of a class-based society in southern Africa. This artifact shows the Mapungubwe as a wealthy trading centre. Duffey in studying the many fragments of gold foil and the rhino, bovine and feline from noticed that the same type of images, symbols and shapes are found on the rim and base of a BaLemba divining bowl.

== See also ==
- Order of Mapungubwe
- Mapungubwe Collection
