= Schroda, South Africa =

Archaeological site in South Africa

Schroda
- Interactive map of Schroda
- 22°11′00″S 29°25′25″E

Schroda is an archaeological site located on the Limpopo River in northern South Africa. Starting in approximately 900 CE it was settled by the Zhizo people and like became the regional capital. The Zhizo made elaborate pottery with diverse styles, for which they were named after. Figurines were used as props in school lessons. They traded ivory, gold, rhino skins, leopard skins, and iron to coastal cities such as Chibuene in exchange for glass beads, cotton and silk cloths, and glazed ceramics.

== Finds ==
Schroda is well known for its abundant finds of anthropomorphic figurines.

== See also ==
- Thomas Huffman

== External Sites ==
- Schroda Figurines
