= Ratho Kroonkop =

South African Archeological site

- Location in South Africa
- 22°15′42″S 29°2′44″E
- Location: Limpopo Province of South Africa
- Region: South Africa

History
- Built: K2 period

Site notes
- Excavation dates: 2006
- Archaeologists: Alex Schoeman, Bronwen van Doornum, and students at the University of Pretoria and University of Botswana

Ratho Kroonkop is an archaeological site located in South Africa, near the Botswana border. It is part of a wider range of sites that comprise the Shashe-Limpopo Confluence Area (SLCA), the region where the Shashe River and Limpopo intersect. It was occupied as early as 890 BCE by hunter gatherers through 1240 CE by people living in settlements such as Schroda, Mapungubwe, Bambandyanalo. Both Ratho Kroonkop and the wider SLCA are known for their history of rain-control. During times of drought, residents of the area would perform complex rituals in order to encourage rain to fall. At Ratho Kroonkop there are four rock tanks, holes formed in the center of a rock by water-weakened sandstone erosion, that held a combined 33,903 faunal specimens analyzed by zooarchaeologists. Most of these faunal remains are related to water through ethnography, marking this as a rain-control site. Notably, the rain-control rituals practiced at Ratho Kroonkop suggest that a partnership between hunter-gatherers and farmers created a unique culture.

== Historical context ==
Hunters first arrived in the SLCA in 890 BCE and were followed by farmers in 350 CE. Ceramic remains indicate that there were two waves of farmers from different groups. Archaeologists believe that the arrival of farmers was motivated by a desire for trade with people on the East coast and a lack of rain pushed them to this area. With the Swahili Coast nearby, settlers were able to take advantage of the opportunity to trade and grew crops in the wetter climate to do so. A settlement called Bambandyanalo, known in short as K2, was established alongside several nearby rain control sites such as Ratho Kroonkop. K2's era of prevalence marked the beginnings of a more complex farming society that traded extensively. The K2 period (AD 1000-1220) eventually gave way to collapse and a new settlement sprang up called Mapungubwe (AD 1200-1300), which was located just 35 kilometers away from Ratho Kroonkop. Movement from Mapungubwe shows a solidification of distinct social classes and a new political ideology. Throughout these political shifts, both farmers and hunter gatherers remained in the area and worked together for the purpose of creating rain. When farmers eventually left Mapungubwe in 1300 CE, hunter gatherers left too, supporting the assertion that the two groups had become reliant on one another.

== Excavation ==
Ratho Kroonkop was first excavated starting in 2006 by Alex Schoeman, Bronwen van Doornum, and students at the University of Pretoria and University of Botswana. Access to the site was difficult, given that there are only two entrances in the form of tunnels formed by large boulders. Once at Ratho Kroonkop, excavators found four rock tanks, the first of which (Tank 1) is located on the southwestern edge of the site. Archaeologists originally only excavated a 50 cm^2 test square, but it was then expanded to be 1 square meter. The second rock tank (Tank 2) lies on the north side of the site and was excavated in a 1 by 3 meter trench. Termite activity damaged some artifacts present in the tank and makes identifying them difficult. Both of these rock tanks contained faunal remains from bovids, fish, birds, reptiles, amphibians, and mollusks. In total, there were 33,903 specimens from the rock tanks, but only 13.7% of these were able to be identified more specifically. Other artifacts in the tanks include ceramic sherds, metal helixes, beads, shells, and charcoal. Dating of charcoal indicates that different rock tanks at Ratho Kroonkop were used at different times. Nothing else is stated about these remains, aside from they were also found at nearby rain-control sites. Tanks 3 and 4, situated on the western edge of Ratho Kroonkop, contained no notable faunal remains or artifacts. Between Tanks 1 and 2, excavators also found four central areas with material remains referred to as Central Areas A, B, C, and D. Most of the artifacts from these areas come from Central Area A.

== Zooarchaeology ==
While there was a large amount of faunal specimens, only a small portion could be used for further research due to poor preservation. Most of the indicated remains are fragments of bones of varying sizes. Tank 1 had better preserved remnants than Tank 2 did. Of the identified specimens, most were only categorized as far as their size or taxa. Forty nine taxa were found in the faunal remains, with the most numerous being small fish and medium sized mammals. Analysis of the present remains indicates that mammals were killed elsewhere, and smaller ones were brought back whole while only parts of larger mammals were carried to the rock tanks. Dating shows that Rock Tank 1 experienced one period of use, while Tank 2 was used during three distinct periods. All of the animals represented by the faunal remains at Ratho Krankoop were linked symbolically to rain across Africa and many appear frequently in rock art.

=== Mammals ===
Rhinoceros, found in faunal remains and artistic representation, are considered in surrounding cultures to be very potent, making them symbols of power and the elite. Kudu, klipspringers, and cattle have more direct associations with water through rain rituals. People in Botswana hunt kudu during times of drought and then grind the dung in their stomachs to a powder. Klipspringers are also hunted during dry seasons. People wash them with rain medicine before killing them and burning their bones. The imagery of blackened bones is said to form dark rain clouds. As for cattle, a cow's stomach placed on a grave is believed to bring rain in some cultures. Of these three bovids, the archaeological remains consist mainly of bone fragments from facial features, teeth, and limbs. Lastly, giraffes and zebra are associated with rain through their appearance and sound. A herd of running giraffes make a rain-like noise with their hooves and the stripes of zebra are found on the water spirits of some religions.

=== Birds ===
Most birds are considered sacred to African tribes and are very rarely eaten. One reason for this is the lightning bird myth, which states that lightning is a bird striking the Earth while depositing eggs. The shells of ostrich eggs in particular are considered very potent. At Ratho Kroonkop, wing fragments of birds are found, which is very notable in the context of their value.

=== Reptiles ===
Another legend found across several African cultures is that of the water snake. Many snakes live in watery holes that evoke the idea of them being tied to rain creation. Fish were considered a kind of snake, and bone fragments from them are particularly abundant in the rock tanks of Ratho Kroonkop. Identified species include the smallmouth yellowfish, catfish, squeakers, and yellowfish.

== Interpretation in terms of rain control ==
In order to best understand the purpose of the rock tanks and the meaning of different faunal specimens, researchers look at modern day practices in the region. Due to the fact that a variety of groups occupied the SLCA, archaeologists use ethnographic analogy (the basis of ethnoarchaeology) to draw comparisons to several cultural groups currently inhabiting South Africa, Botswana, and Zimbabwe. A few of these cultures include the San, Shona, /Xam, Pedi, and Zulu, alongside a number of others. These methods are somewhat scrutinized and often cannot make definite conclusions, only indicating some explanations that could be true. Many of the remains at Ratho Kroonkop are charred or burned, possibly because burning is considered a symbolic sacrifice to attract attention and sympathy from higher powers. Also, several animals are closely tied to water, because it is believed that killing them will cool the Earth. Of the remains identified, some of the animals have close ties to water in hunter gatherer ethnographies while others are closely related to water in farming societies. Once again, the two groups are found being blended together in this region.
