= Bambandyanalo =

Archaeological site in Zimbabwe

Bambandyanalo or K2 is an archaeological site in present-day South Africa, just south of the Limpopo River. It flourished from the 11th to 13th centuries, being a predecessor to the Kingdom of Mapungubwe. The ruins have survived because much of the complex was built in stone. The site contains a large mound, some 180 metres in diameter, and covers an area of about 5 hectares. It is surrounded on three sides by sandstone cliffs (Wood 2005:86). In the 11th century, Bambandyanalo developed its influence over the region and established itself as a hub in the trade connecting the African inland with the Indian Ocean (Hall 1987:83).

People were buried in areas associated with their life. Women worked copper, while men worked iron. Family heads resolved disputes in their homestead, however external disputes were handled by the court, located near the cattle kraal. The cattle kraal was crucial to a man's life, and the lobola (bride price) was usually paid in cattle.

They cultivated sorghum, pearl millet, finger millet, ground beans, and cowpeas. The population expanded, and K2 had a population of 1500 by 1200. Rainmaking was widespread, and the chief sometimes hired strangers, such as the San, who were believed to have special relationships with the spirits of the land due to a longer habitation. Some Zhizo remained at Leokwe, likely subordinate to K2 while specialising in rituals also due to their longer habitation. Eveidence of rainmaking is present in the existence of ritual sites, such as Ratho Kroonkop.

The large wealth generated by the Indian Ocean trade created unprecedented inequalities, evolving over time from a society based on social ranking to social classes. K2's spatial arrangement became unsuited to this development, and they moved to Mapungubwe.
