= Thomas Huffman =

South African archaeologist (1944–2022)

Thomas N. Huffman
- Born: Thomas Neil Huffman; 17 July 1944; Kenosha, Wisconsin
- Died: 30 March 2022 (aged 77); Johannesburg, South Africa
- Education: University of Denver (BA); University of Illinois (MA) (PhD)
- Known for: Culture history Central Cattle Pattern
- Scientific career
- Fields: Archaeology
- Workplaces: University of Witwatersrand

Thomas N. Huffman (17 July 1944 – 30 March 2022) was Professor Emeritus of archaeology in association with the University of Witwatersrand in Johannesburg, South Africa. He specialised in pre-colonial farming societies in southern Africa. Huffman is most well known for his identification of the Central Cattle Pattern at Mapungubwe, a pre-colonial state in southern Africa. This, in turn he argued as the main influence in the formation of the Zimbabwe Pattern at Great Zimbabwe. Arguably his seminal contribution to the field was A Handbook to the Iron Age: The Archaeology of Pre-Colonial Farming Societies in Southern Africa (2007), which has contributed to the understanding of ceramic style analysis and culture history focusing on these groups.

== Biography ==
=== Personal history ===
Huffman was born in Kenosha, Wisconsin on 17 July 1944. As a child, he and his family moved to Texas and then again to Oklahoma where they settled. Since the Oklahoma state was former Native American territory, he became especially interested in the Native American past. As a result he became interested in the field of archaeology. At the age of 13, Huffman and his family moved to Colorado for employment opportunity reasons.

=== Career ===
In 1966 he attended University of Denver where he received a BA in Anthropology. He then went on to do his MA and PhD at the University of Illinois in 1968 and 1974 respectively. While at Illinois, he studied under Brian Fagan whom he accompanied to Zambia in 1967, an event that piqued his interest in pre-colonial farming societies in southern Africa. For his doctoral thesis, Huffman examined a southern African Middle Iron Age group (Leopard's Kopje).

Huffman joined the Historical Monuments Commission in Rhodesia (now Zimbabwe) in 1970, acting as Keeper/Inspector of Monuments. Seven years later he relocated to South Africa, where he took up the position of Head of Department in Archaeology at the University of the Witwatersrand. He remained based at the University of the Witwatersrand until 2009, at which point he retired as Professor Emeritus. Huffman was still active in research, however.

==== Influences ====
Huffman's work has been influenced by scholars such as David Lewis-Williams, Donald Lathrap and Adam Kuper.

==== Theoretical underpinnings ====
As a cultural anthropologist, Huffman makes use of ethnographic data from descendant groups as well as outside, colonial sources, to understand the beliefs and practices of past peoples. This avenue of research is augmented with the use of multiple hypothesis testing. It was proposed by Huffman that settlement patterns could provide insight into understanding these prehistoric societies. It was this realisation that led to the creation of the Central Cattle Pattern.

Physical manifestations of prehistoric beliefs and values through the organisation of spaces and ritual areas provide insight into beliefs and practices. Huffman argues that this is possible because peoples divide their spaces into specific areas reserved for various activities. These spaces shape cultural relationships. For Huffman this is evidenced and supported by the study of ethnographic data.

==== Contributions to the field ====
===== Iron Age archaeology in southern Africa =====
Huffman's main contributions to southern African Iron Age archaeology are his analysis of ceramic styles to understand cultural processes and the analysis of settlement patterns as a means of understanding the worldviews of pre-colonial cultures. This research was employed by Huffman to argue for the origins of the Zimbabwe Pattern as coming from the Central Cattle Pattern at Mapungubwe.

By using these culture-historical approaches, Huffman reconstructs major drought episodes within the Iron Age. Examination of burnt grain bins and houses, led Huffman to argue that the practice of this burning was linked to rituals whereby these structures were burnt to cleanse the possessions of those who were thought to be responsible for drought. Independent data correlated with these rituals, and this data was employed to discuss episodes of drought in both southern Africa and South America.

===== Critiques =====
Huffman's research on Bantu agro-pastoralist society and his interpretations of the archaeology of Great Zimbabwe has sparked much debate. Some scholars have highlighted concerns that Huffman's use of broad structuralist models when arguing the Central Cattle Pattern place too much emphasis on the general, therefore not closing in on more specific questions of individual Early Iron Age settlements.

Others have taken issue with the argument that Early Iron Age settlements were able to remain much the same throughout the Early Iron Age, and call for explanations as to how these agro-pastoralist groups were able to maintain similar structural relationships for two thousand years. This model also excludes problems of interactions with outside foraging groups.

===== Later research =====
Huffman’s later research in southern Africa follows two main veins: population dynamics and cultural boundaries/changes. This research is being conducted within the Mapungubwe ‘core area’ (as defined by Huffman himself). This area, physiographically, covers the Karoo environment, granites and a metamorphic zone. His work on population dynamics involves a systematic survey of the area for Iron Age sites. From this Huffman charts population changes through time.

In terms of his work on the origins of Venda identity he examines ceramic styles and changes therein and the cultural boundaries between Shona and Sotho-Tswana, which may have led to the development of this Venda identity.

1. Huffman, T.N. 1970. The Early Iron Age and the spread of the Bantu. South African Archaeological Bulletin 25(07): 3–21.
2. Huffman, T.N. 1974. The Leopard's Kopje Tradition. Salisbury: National Museums and Monuments (Memoir 6). 150p.
3. Huffman, T.N. 1982. Archaeology and ethnohistory of the African Iron Age. Annual Review of Anthropology 11:133 50.
4. Huffman, T.N. 1984. Expressive space in the Zimbabwe culture. Man (NS) 19(4): 593–612.
5. Huffman, T.N. 1986. Iron Age settlement patterns and the origins of class distinction in southern Africa. Wendorf, F.and Close, E. (eds). Advances in World Archaeology 5: 291–338.
6. Huffman, T.N. 1986. Archaeological evidence and conventional explanations of Southern Bantu settlement patterns. Africa 56(3):280–298.
7. Huffman, T.N. 1989. Iron Age Migrations: The ceramic sequence in southern Zambia. Johannesburg: University of the Witwatersrand Press.
8. Huffman, T.N. and J.C. VOGEL. 1991. The chronology of Great Zimbabwe. South African Archaeological Bulletin 46(154):61–70.
9. Huffman, T.N. 1993. Broederstroom and the Central Cattle Pattern. South African Journal of Science 89:220–226.
10. Huffman, T.N. and R.K. HERBERT. 1994/1995. New perspectives of Eastern Bantu. AZANIA 29–30: 27–36.
11. Huffman, T.N. 1996. Archaeological evidence for climatic change during the last 2000 years in southern Africa. Quaternary International 33: 55–60.
12. Huffman, T.N. 1996. Snakes and Crocodiles: Power and symbolism in Ancient Zimbabwe. Johannesburg: Witwatersrand University Press.
13. Huffman, T.N. 2000. Mapungubwe and the origins of the Zimbabwe culture. South African Archaeological Society Goodwin Series 8: 14–29.
14. Huffman, T.N. 2001. The Central Cattle Pattern and interpreting the past. Southern African Humanities 13: 19–35.
15. Huffman, T.N. 2002. Regionality in the Iron Age: the case of the Sotho-Tswana. Southern African Humanities 14: 1–22.
16. Huffman, T.N. and Murimbika, M. 2003. Shona ethnography and Iron Age burials. Journal of African Archaeology 1(2):237–246.
17. Huffman, T.N. 2004. The archaeology of the Nguni past. Southern African Humanities 16: 79–111.
18. Huffman, T.N. 2005. Mapungubwe: Ancient African Civilisation on the Limpopo. Johannesburg: Wits University Press. 63 pp.
19. Huffman, T.N. 2006. Maize grindstones, Madikwe pottery and ochre mining. Southern African Humanities 18:51–70.
20. Huffman, T.N. 2007. A Handbook to the Iron Age: The Archaeology of Pre-Colonial Farming Societies in Southern Africa. Pietermaritzburg: University of KwaZulu-Natal Press, 540 pp.
21. Huffman, T.N. 2008. Climate change during the Iron Age in the Shashe-Limpopo Basin, southern Africa. Journal of Archaeological Science 35: 2032–2047.
22. Huffman, T.N. 2009. Mapungubwe and Great Zimbabwe: The origin and spread of social complexity in southern Africa. Journal of Anthropological Archaeology 28: 37–54.
23. Huffman, T.N. 2009. A cultural proxy for drought: ritual burning in the Iron Age of Southern Africa. Journal of Archaeological Science 36: 991–1005.
24. Huffman, T.N. 2010. Intensive El Nino and the Iron Age of South-Eastern Africa. Journal of Archaeological Science 37: 2572–2586.
25. Huffman, T.N. & Du Piesanie, J. 2011. Khami and the Venda in the Mapungubwe landscape. Journal of African Archaeology 9 (2): 189–206.
26. Neukirch, L.P., J.A. Tarduno, T.N. Huffman, M.K. Watkeys, C.A.Scribner and R.D. Cottrell 2012. An archaeomagnetic analysis of burnt grain bin floors from ca. 1200–1250 AD Iron-Age South Africa. Physics of the Earth and Planetary Interiors 190–191: 71–79.
27. Huffman T.N. 2012. Historical archaeology of the Mapungubwe area: Boer, Birwa, Sotho-Tswana and Machete. Southern African Humanities 24: 33–59.
28. Huffman, T.N. 2012. Ritual space in pre-colonial farming societies in southern Africa. Journal of Ethnoarchaeology 5(4): 119–146.
29. Huffman, T.N., Elburg, M. AND M. Watkeys 2013. Vitrified cattle dung in the Iron Age of Southern Africa. Journal of Archaeological Science 40: 3553–3560.
30. Huffman, T.N. and Frank Lee Earley 2022. Paradigms in Conflict: Archaeology on the High Plains. New York, Nova Science Press Publications.
