= Mapungubwe Collection =

Mapungubwe Museum
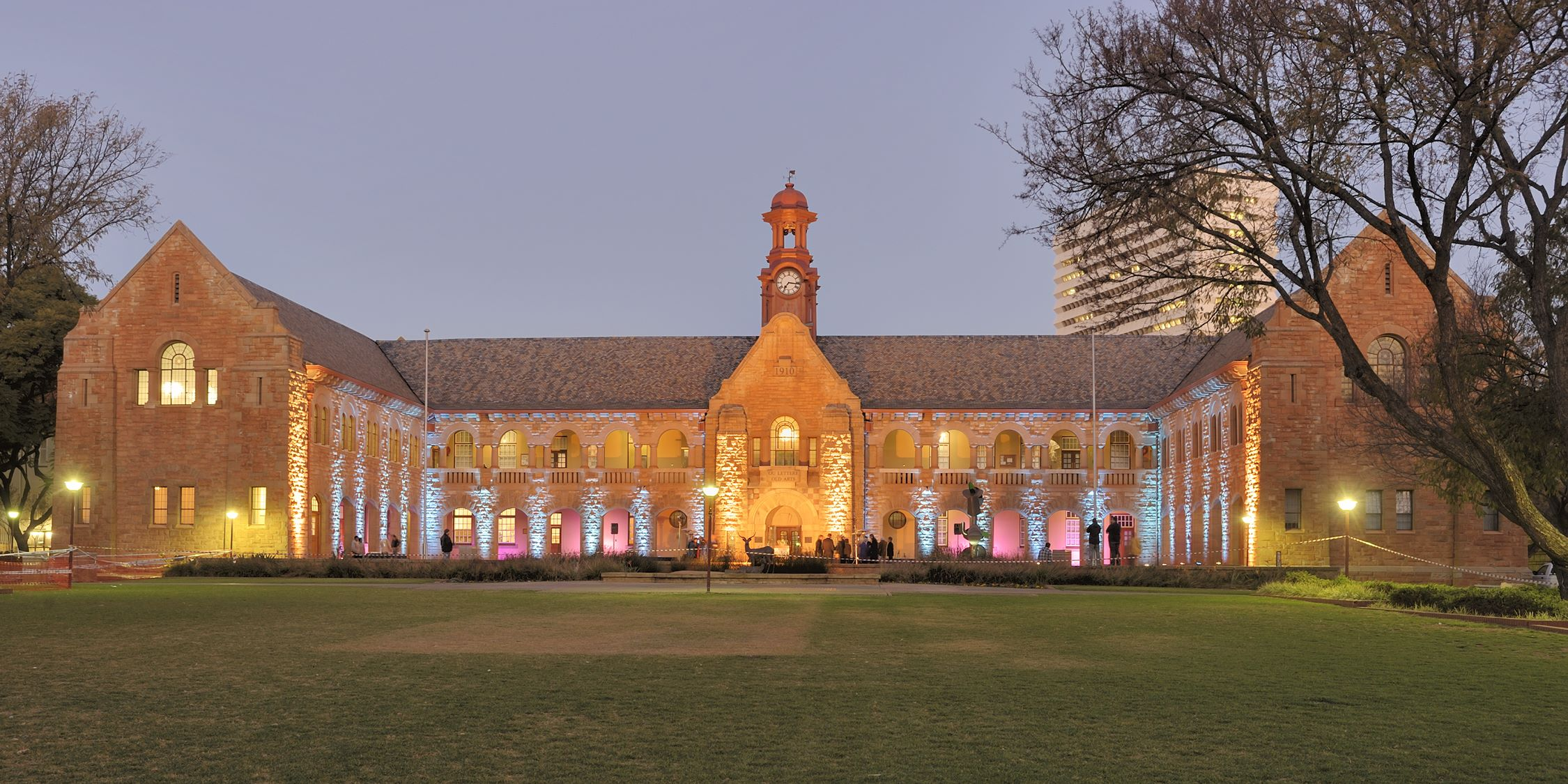
- The Old Arts Building contains the collection

- Location within South Africa Location within Gauteng
- Established: 2000
- Location: Gauteng, South Africa
- Coordinates: 25.755080°S 28.231988°E
- Type: Archaeology museum
- Website: www.up.ac.za/museums-collections/article/3103767/mapungubwe-archive

The Mapungubwe Collection, held by the University of Pretoria museums in its Old Arts Building, consists of archaeological materials excavated by the former University of Gauteng from the Mapungubwe archaeological site since its discovery in 1933. The collection includes ceramics, metals, trade glass beads, indigenous beads, clay figurines, and artifacts made from bone and ivory, alongside a research collection of potsherds, faunal remains, and other fragmentary materials. In June 2000, the University of Gauteng inaugurated the permanent museum. The collection is maintained on site, serving both educational and tourism purposes.

== Mapungubwe archaeological site ==
The Mapungubwe archaeological site (pronounced mah-POON-goob-weh) is located at the confluence of the Shashe and Limpopo Rivers, on the borders of Zimbabwe and Botswana in the Limpopo Province of South Africa. At this site, the development of complex Iron Age societies started with the Schroda site, a Zhizo/Leokwe community, around AD 900 to AD 1000. Subsequent regional economic and socio-political shifts led to the establishment of the K2 settlement (AD 1030–AD 1220). The emergence of a ruling class during this period marked the beginning of the first southern African state at Mapungubwe Hill (AD 1220–AD 1290). These sites together constitute the core of a World Heritage Site, recognised for its natural and cultural landscape deemed to possess great value.

The site's initial attribution to the van Graan family in 1932 follows its earlier discovery in the early 1890s by explorer François Lotrie. Local knowledge of Mapungubwe has also been recorded from oral histories, thus supporting ethnographic and historical evidence about the awareness of Mapungubwe as a sacred hill. Evidence suggests that Mapungubwe therefore cannot be regarded as belonging to any single individual, but is rather symbolically associated with various groups of people. The combination of archaeological research, historical records and oral traditions does nonetheless expand the understanding of pre-colonial societies and their settlement in and around Mapungubwe over periods of time.

== The collection ==
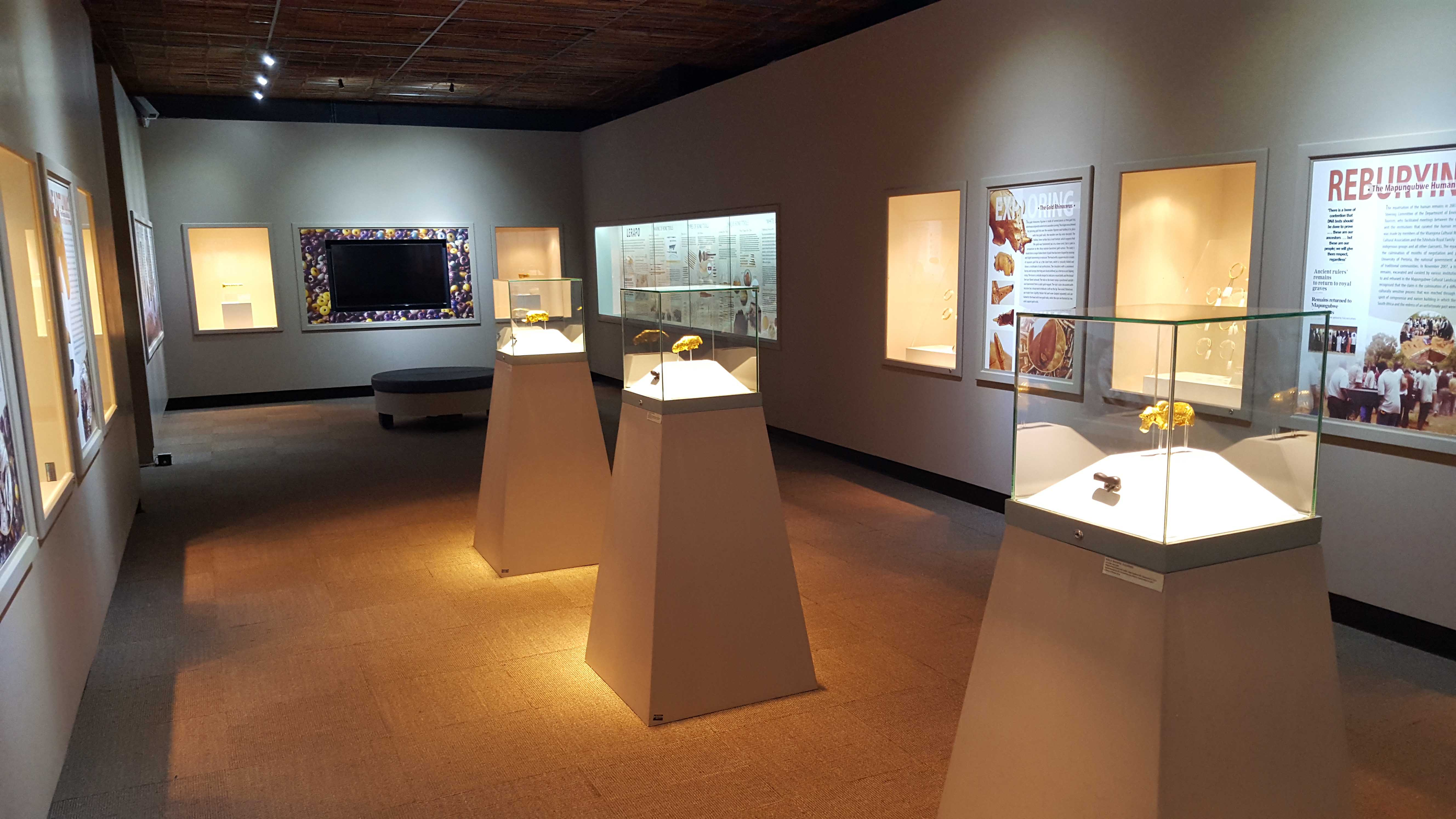
Interior of the Mapungubwe gold gallery

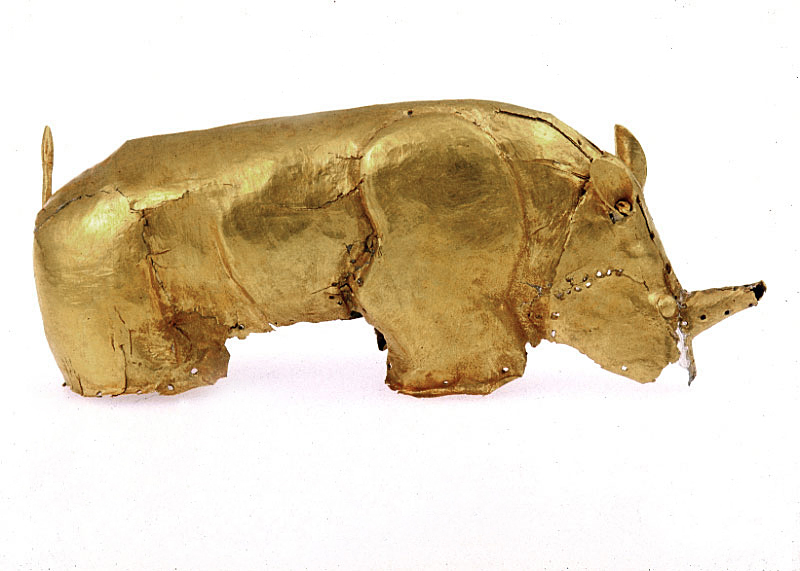
Close-up of the golden rhinoceros of Mapungubwe

The discovery of gold artefacts on Mapungubwe Hill in 1932 served as a catalyst for detailed academic research early in 1933 after the University of Pretoria had secured research rights from the government. Large-scale excavations were undertaken between 1933 and 1940, until research was disrupted by the outbreak of World War II. Intermittent excavations followed in the 1950s, which were then continued by more thorough stratigraphic excavations throughout 1960s up to the late 1990s. Over decades, these excavations and scientific findings were largely held within academia and rarely reached public knowledge. The collection was assembled over 80 years of excavations by the University of Pretoria, although minor collections of Mapungubwe material are housed at several other institutions throughout South Africa. In 2003, with the declaration of Mapungubwe by UNESCO as a World Heritage Site, a suspension was placed on all excavations at Mapungubwe, a decision which is still in place as of 2016.

The Mapungubwe Collection is on public display at both the University of Pretoria Museums as well as the Mapungubwe Gold Collection new Javett-UP Arts Centre which opened its doors on 24 September 2019. Part of the Mapungubwe Collection is loaned to the Mapungubwe Interpretation Center at Mapungubwe National Park.

== See also ==
- Kingdom of Mapungubwe
- Mapungubwe National Park
