= Mapela, Zimbabwe =

Archaeological site in Zimbabwe

Mapela Hill is an archaeological site located in southwestern Zimbabwe, 90km northwest of Mapungubwe.

== Description ==
The town flourished between 1055 and 1400. The site was likely chosen for settlement due to the association of hills with rainmaking. The site is strong evidence for the multidirectional evolution of socio-political complexity in the Zambezi culture, contradicting the traditional assumption of linear evolution where Leopard's Kopje led directly and solely to Great Zimbabwe.

Excavations at Mapela Hill discovered large stone walls dating from the 11th century, organised in a structure known as dzimbahwe in Shona, in which elites were enclosed with commoners outside. This embedded class distinction and sacral kingship, with the site nearly 200 years earlier than Mapungubwe, traditionally assumed to be the first kingdom in Southern Africa. Mapela includes terrace walls, dhaka (stone) floors, and abundant local pottery.
