= Toutswemogala Hill =

Iron Age settlement in Botswana

Coordinates: 22°13′57″S 27°11′57″E

Toutswemogala Hill lies 6.5 km West of the North-South Highway in the Central District of Botswana. It is situated about 50 km north of the village of Palapye. Toutswemogala is an elongated flat-topped hill, geologically called a mesa, rising about 50 meters above the surrounding flat mopane veld. It is an Iron Age settlement, which has been occupied on two occasions. The radio-carbon dates for this settlement range from 7th to late 19th century AD indicating occupation of more than one thousand years. The hill was part of the formation of early states in Southern Africa with cattle keeping as major source of economy. This was supplemented by goats, sheep and foraging as well as hunting of wild animals. The remaining features of Toutswe settlement include house-floors, large heaps of vitrified cow-dung and burials while the outstanding structure is the stone wall. There are large traits of centaurs ciliaris, a type of grass which has come to be associated with cattle-keeping settlements in South, Central Africa.

Several historians have described Toutswe as a state or kingdom.

== History ==
Around 700-900 CE, the Zhizo people moved westward to Toutswe in Botswana after being displaced from the Limpopo-Shashi Basin by the Leopard's Kopje people, and began an agricultural and pastoral land tenure system based on sorghum and millet, and domesticated stock, respectively. Some scholars believe their relations to have been hostile, however others insist they were more complex, both socially and politically.

The site was situated in the center of a broader cultural area in Eastern Botswana and shares many commonalities with other archaeological sites of this region, in both ceramic production styles and also timeframes inhabited. Large structures were observed that contained vitrified remains of animal dung, leading to the theory that these were animal enclosures and that Toutswemogala Hill was thus a major center of animal husbandry in the region. However, agriculture also played a vital role in the longevity of Toutswemogala Hill's extended occupation, as many grain storage structures have also been found on the site. Many different stratified layers of housing floors further signal continuous occupation over hundreds of years.

Skeletal remains of 84 individuals from Toutswe tradition sites are used to assess the palaeodemographic characteristics of the communities. The analysis includes estimation of age and sex. The data are used to construct a life table, which is then compared to data from K2 and Mapungubwe. The results indicate a high infant mortality and a low life expectancy at birth. However, by comparison to K2 and Mapungubwe communities, the Toutswe people appear to have had better survival chances. The palaeodemographic characteristics of these communities are typical of pre-industrialized communities throughout the world. The representativeness of the sample is discussed.
