= Leopard's Kopje =

Archaeological site in Zimbabwe

- Geographical range: Matabeleland
- Period: Middle Iron Age
- Dates: c. 650 – c. 1220
- Preceded by: Gokomere culture
- Followed by: Kingdom of Mapungubwe

Leopard's Kopje (Note: Kopje, pronounced /ˈkɔp.jə/, means small hill in South African english, and the word was burrowed from the Afrikaans word meaning head.) is an archaeological site, the type site of the associated region or culture that marked the Middle Iron Age in Zimbabwe. The ceramics from the Leopard's Kopje type site have been classified as part of phase II of the Leopard's Kopje culture. For information on the region of Leopard's Kopje, see the "Associated sites" section of this article.

== Location ==
The site is located 2 kilometers north-east of the Khami World Heritage Site and 24 kilometers west of Bulawayo, Zimbabwe. Bordered by small hills, or koppies, on two sides and sharp ravines on the other two sides. The site is relatively small, measuring 150 by 200 yards in area.

== History ==
K. R. Robinson conducted several excavations in the area, beginning in 1961. Thomas Huffman, who first excavated Leopard's Kopje in August 1969, is also an important archaeologist of the site. Huffman's excavations found three different phases of occupation, Zhizo, Mambo, and Refuge.

=== Refuge phase ===
The occupation from the 18/19th centuries is called the Refuge phase. Because it was the latest phase of occupation at the Leopard's Kopje site, its stratigraphy is closest to the surface and was therefore excavated first. Below a thin humus layer was a large ashy layer, in which artifacts such as zebra teeth, freshwater mussel shells, and turtle shells were found. Pottery sherds were found in middens and among stone structures. At least one known burial was found at this level.

=== Mambo phase ===
In the original excavation by Huffman, several structures were found at the Mambo phase level, dating to the 10/11th centuries. Artifacts such as figurines and cattle teeth were discovered in multiple trenches. Evidence of an infant burial was also found. Several hut floors and plastered courtyards were uncovered, giving archaeologists a sense of the layout of the settlement.

=== Zhizo phase ===
The stratigraphy shows that the earliest settlement is from the 9th century AD, now called the Zhizo phase. Possible traces of manure indicate that people kept goats or sheep. Along with large amounts of Zhizo pottery, artifacts such as glass and shell beads, copper bangles, daga rubble (Note: Daga is a form of wet clay that has been historically and is used to build clay huts by the southern bantu people in the region. It was sometimes used with dung for adherence.), and iron slag were excavated by Huffman and his team. "Zhizo" is also a term used for the cultural phase that preceded the Leopard's Kopje cultural phase.

== Archaeological characteristics ==
=== Cattle ===
There is strong archaeological evidence that people at Leopard's Kopje kept cattle. Vitrified and angular blocks of dung mark the perimeters of medieval cattle byres. These kraals were located at the center of villages, rather than to the edge of a settlement, meaning cattle would have been a central and important part of daily life. Huffman discovered a large white zone in the stratigraphy of the Mambo phase level that is believed to be cattle manure. Cattle teeth have also been excavated. The introduction of larger cattle herds at Leopard's Kopje around the 10th century are seen as evidence of increased cultural complexity. This is thought to have resulted from a developing gold trade.

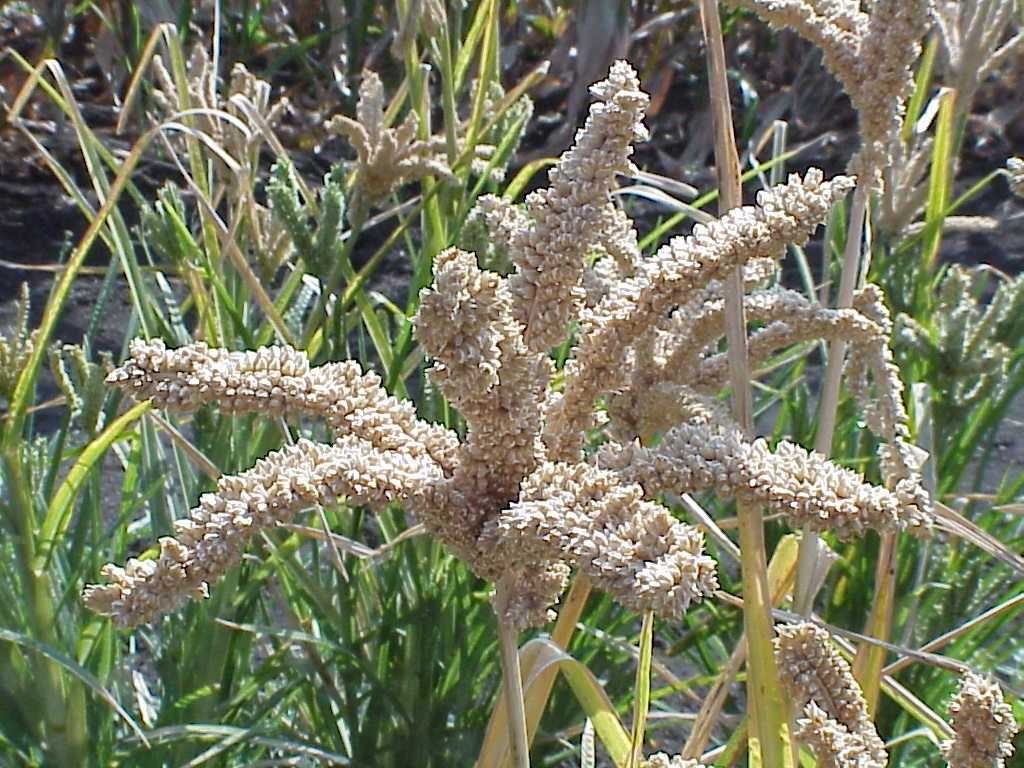
Finger millet, one of the grains consumed by the people of Leopard's Kopje.

=== Diet ===
Archaeobotanical evidence offers insight into the diet of the occupants at Leopard's Kopje. In 1969, Huffman and his team found seeds from finger millet, ground beans, sorghum, cowpeas, and wild plants at the Mambo phase level. The Leopard's Kopje diet would also have consisted of the livestock they kept, including cattle, goat, and sheep.

=== Beads ===
Huffman's excavations found glass and shell beads at the Zhizo phase level, dating back to the 9th century. Some clay beads were also discovered at the Mambo phase level. Robinson's 1961 excavation found just two glass beads. Both were cylindrical and blue-green in color, typical of phase II of the Leopard's Kopje culture.

=== Iron smelting ===
Strong evidence of iron smelting has been found at the Mambo phase level, and bits of iron slag have been found at the Zhizo phase level, suggesting that iron smelting existed at Leopard's Kopje as early as the 9th century.

=== Pottery ===
Excavations of Leopard's Kopje have primarily focused on ceramic analysis. The middle Iron Age brought about a shift from communal ownership of pottery to private ownership. Leopard's Kopje ceramic style is known for being multidimensional, with incised and excised bands. Shallow bowls and plates, jars with triangles, and beakers with high burnished necks are also typical. In Robinson's 1961 excavation alone, 182 pottery fragments were uncovered. The most common vessel found was a shouldered pot with a concave neck and either an incised ladder pattern or a chevron pattern. These motifs were created with incisions or stabs, rather than comb-stamping. Few of the burnished beakers and bowls found were decorated.

=== Stone buildings ===
Settlements throughout the larger Leopard's Kopje region feature stone buildings. The prevalence of these stone structures is the inspiration behind the name "Zimbabwe," which means "houses of stone." Evidence of stone buildings were found by Huffman at the Refuge phase level. The evolution from earthen houses to stone buildings is an indication of social changes, much like the introduction of larger cattle herds.

== Associated sites ==
The area associated with the Leopard's Kopje region stretches from just south of Belingwe, Zimbabwe, down to the Limpopo River. Archaeological sites in the region date to between 650-1100 AD. The six type sites that have been selected as most representative of the Leopard's Kopje culture are Zhizo Hill, York Ranch, Leopard's Kopje, Taba Zikamambo, Woolandale Estate Midden Mounds, and Enyandeni Farm. Other notable associated sites include Mapela Hill, K2 or Bambandyanalo, Khami, and Mapungubwe.

== See also ==
- Khami
- Thomas Huffman
- Kingdom of Mapungubwe
- Great Zimbabwe
- Bambandyanalo
