= Naletale =

Archaeological site in Zimbabwe

Coordinates: 19°52′52″S 29°31′50″E

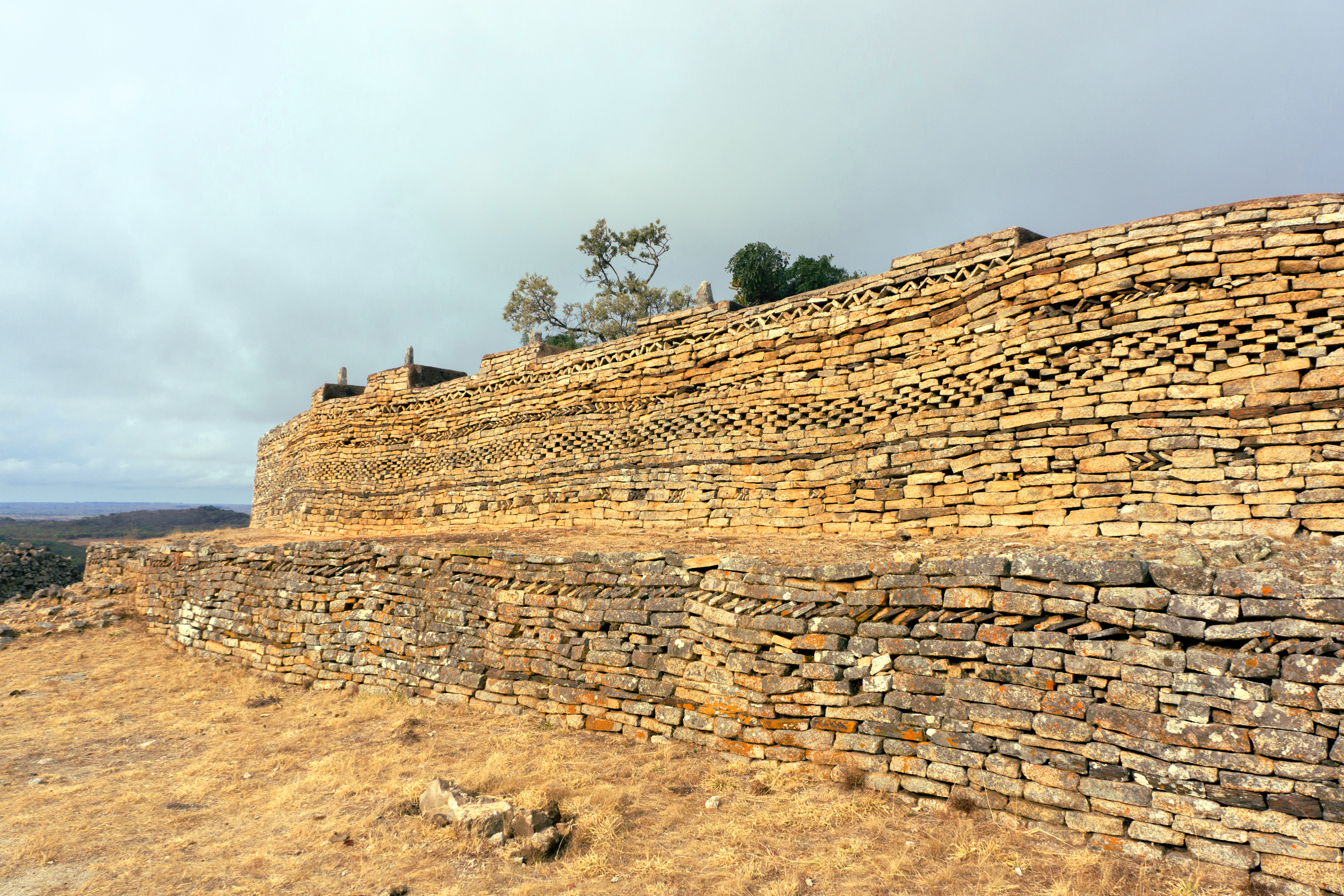
Naletale wall

Naletale (or Nalatale) are ruins located about 25 kilometres east of Shangani in Matabeleland South, Zimbabwe and east of the Danangombe ruins, close to the Somabhula Flats.

The ruins are attributed to the Kalanga Torwa State and are thought to date from the seventeenth century, and were occupied through the eighteenth to nineteenth centuries during Rozvi rule. The ruins are the remains of the capital of the Butua kingdom's Torwa dynasty. In 1960, it was declared a national monument.

== History ==
Established following the decline of Great Zimbabwe, the Torwa dynasty founded Khami in the 15th century and Dhlo Dhlo in the 16th century, later relocating their capital to Nalatale in the 17th century. Following nearly two centuries of Torwa rule, the Rozvi people took control of the area.

European treasure hunters desecrated the site in the 1800s, and it was designated a national monument in the 1960s. Conservation efforts slowed in the 1980s due to financial constraints, and by 2012, the ruins faced severe risks of collapsing. In 2013, a grant from the U.S. Ambassadors Fund for Cultural Preservation enabled the restoration of Nalatale's stone walls, site access improvements, and the addition of interpretative facilities. The project was completed in 2014.

== Design ==
Six decorations have been recorded on this drystone walled site, including chevrons, herringbone, cord, checkers and the use of alternating colored stone inserts.
