= Ziwa =

Archaeological site in Zimbabwe

Coordinates: 18°08′S 32°38′E

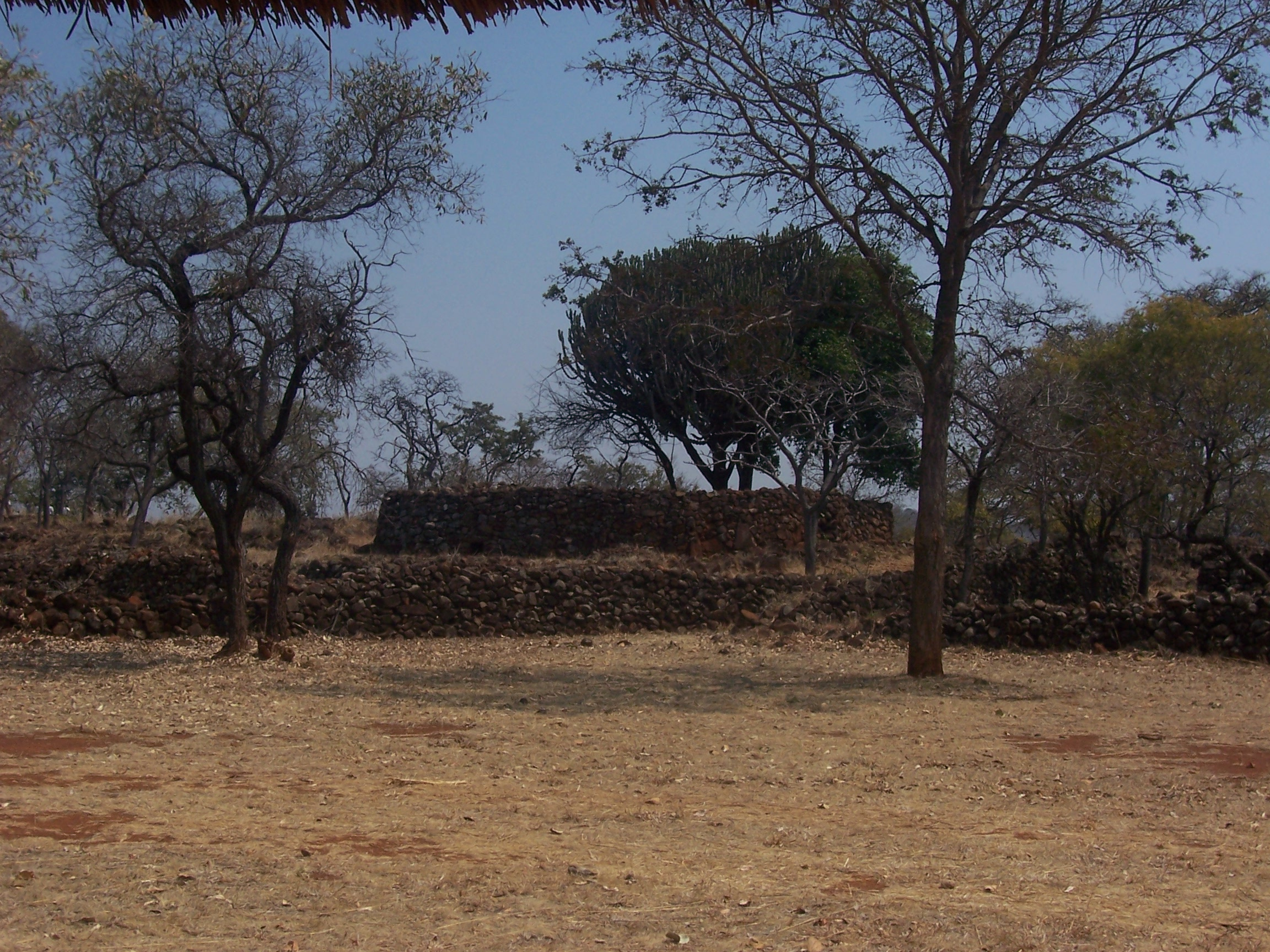
Ziwa ruins, enclosure view from a distance.

Ziwa is an archaeological site in Nyanga District, Zimbabwe, containing the remains of a vast late Iron Age agricultural settlement dated to the 15th century. It is one of many sites that compose the Nyanga Iron Age ruins. Ziwa was declared a National Monument in 1946 and is currently under consideration for World Heritage listing. The site contains a large variety of stonework structures including stone terraces running along contours of hills and steep landscapes. Archaeological investigations have also uncovered important aspects of pottery and rock art.

Before the declaration of the site as a National Monument, Ziwa had been part of the commercial farms area and was thus under private ownership. A great deal of damage or degradation of antiquities may have been wrought during this period as the farmer used the property as a cattle ranch. Currently a site museum (with tourist facilities such as camping, guided tours, walking trails, bird viewing, etc.) has been established to represent the Ziwa heritage and other archaeological sites in the Nyanga district.

Despite the abandonment of the site by its inhabitants in the 18th century, Ziwa continued to be of significance to the later communities that settled in its neighbourhood.

== Description ==
Ziwa bears evidence of human occupation for all the major archaeological periods identified in Zimbabwe's archaeological sequence. That is from hunter-gatherer periods of the Stone Age to historical times. The 3,337 hectares (8,250 acres) of land comprise: Stone Age deposits, rock art sites, early farming communities settlements, a landscape of later farming communities marked by terraces and field systems, hill forts, pit structures and stone enclosures, iron smelting and forging furnaces and numerous remains of daub-plastered housing structures.

== Image gallery ==
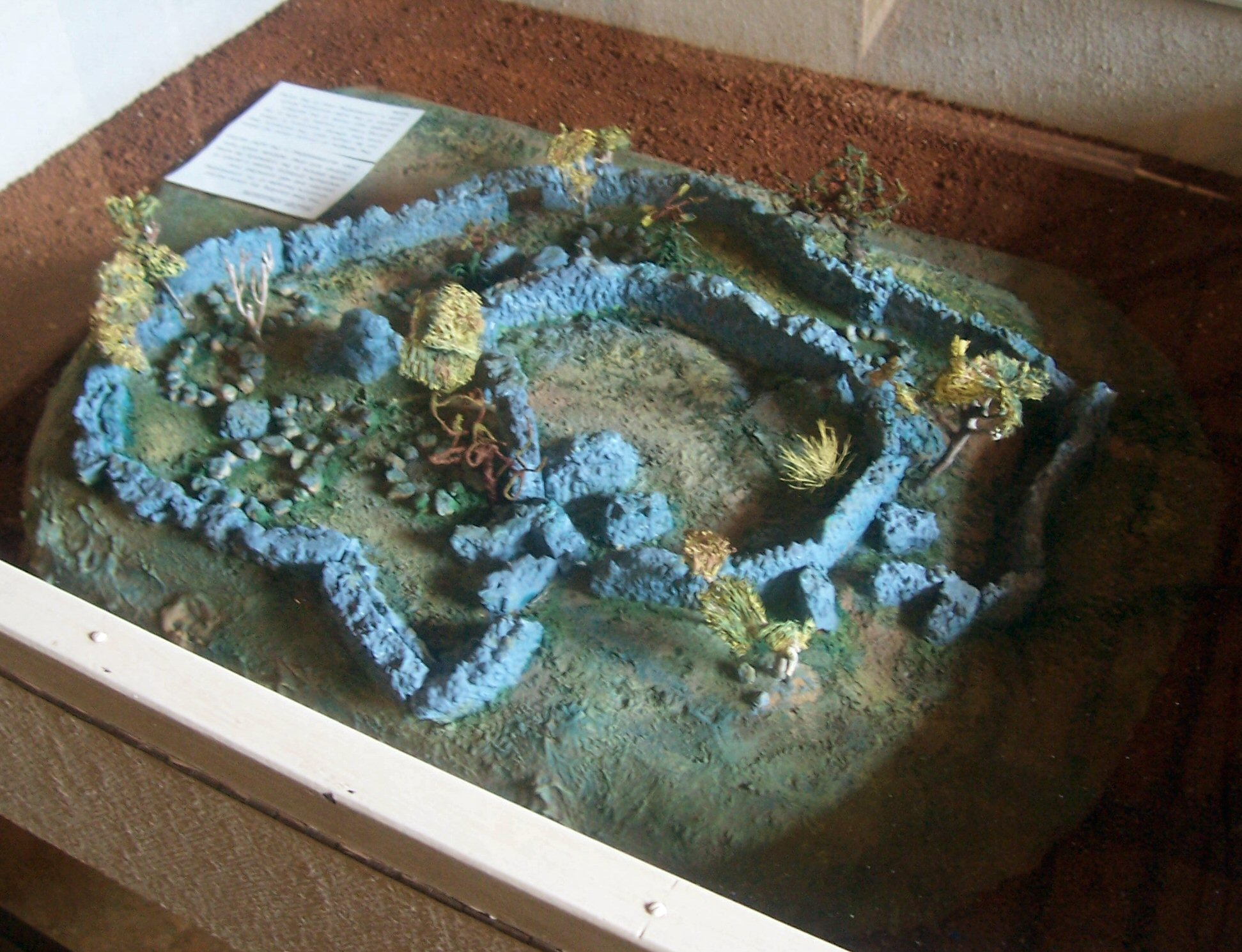
Part of Ziwa ruins scale model, taken in visitors centre

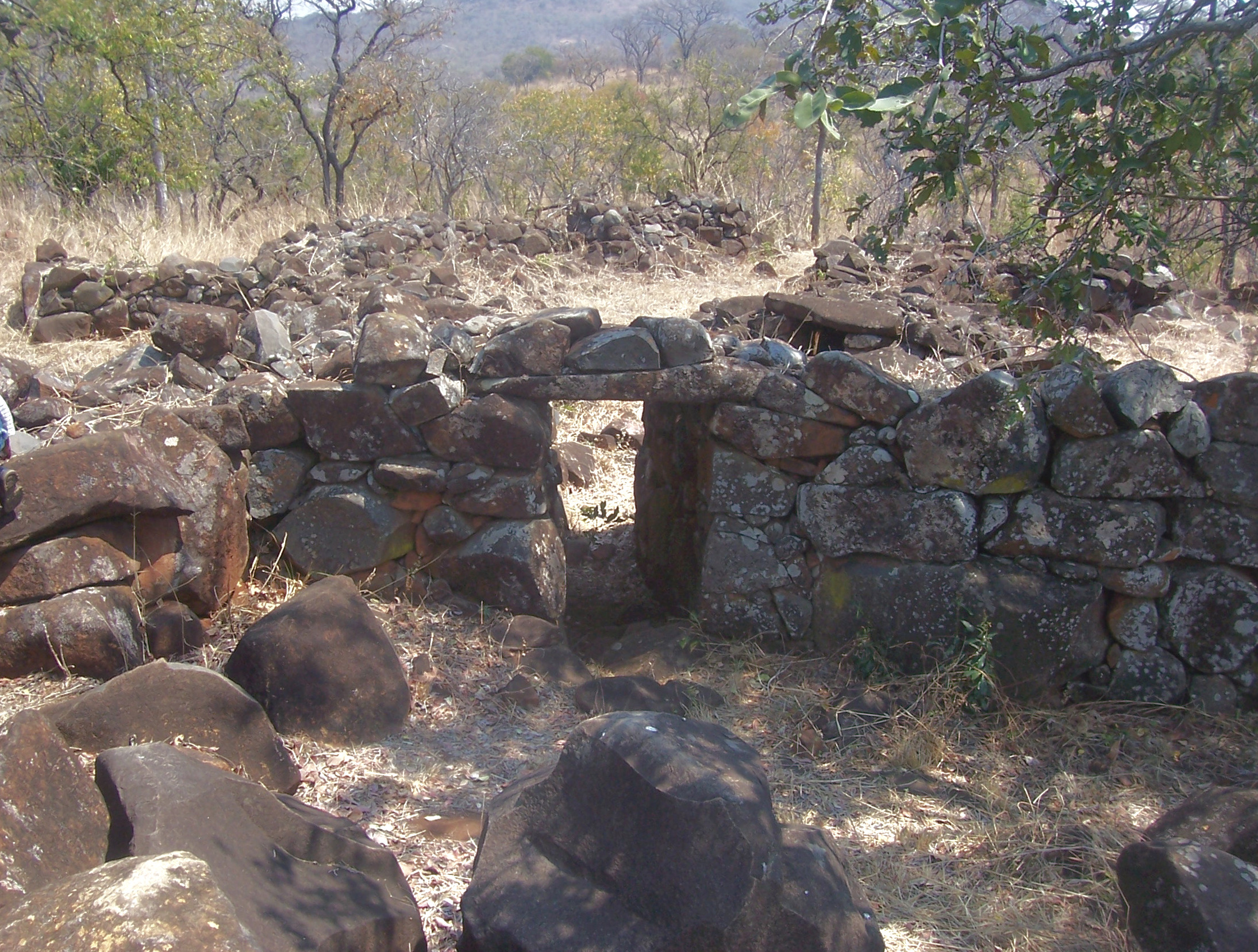
Pit entrance

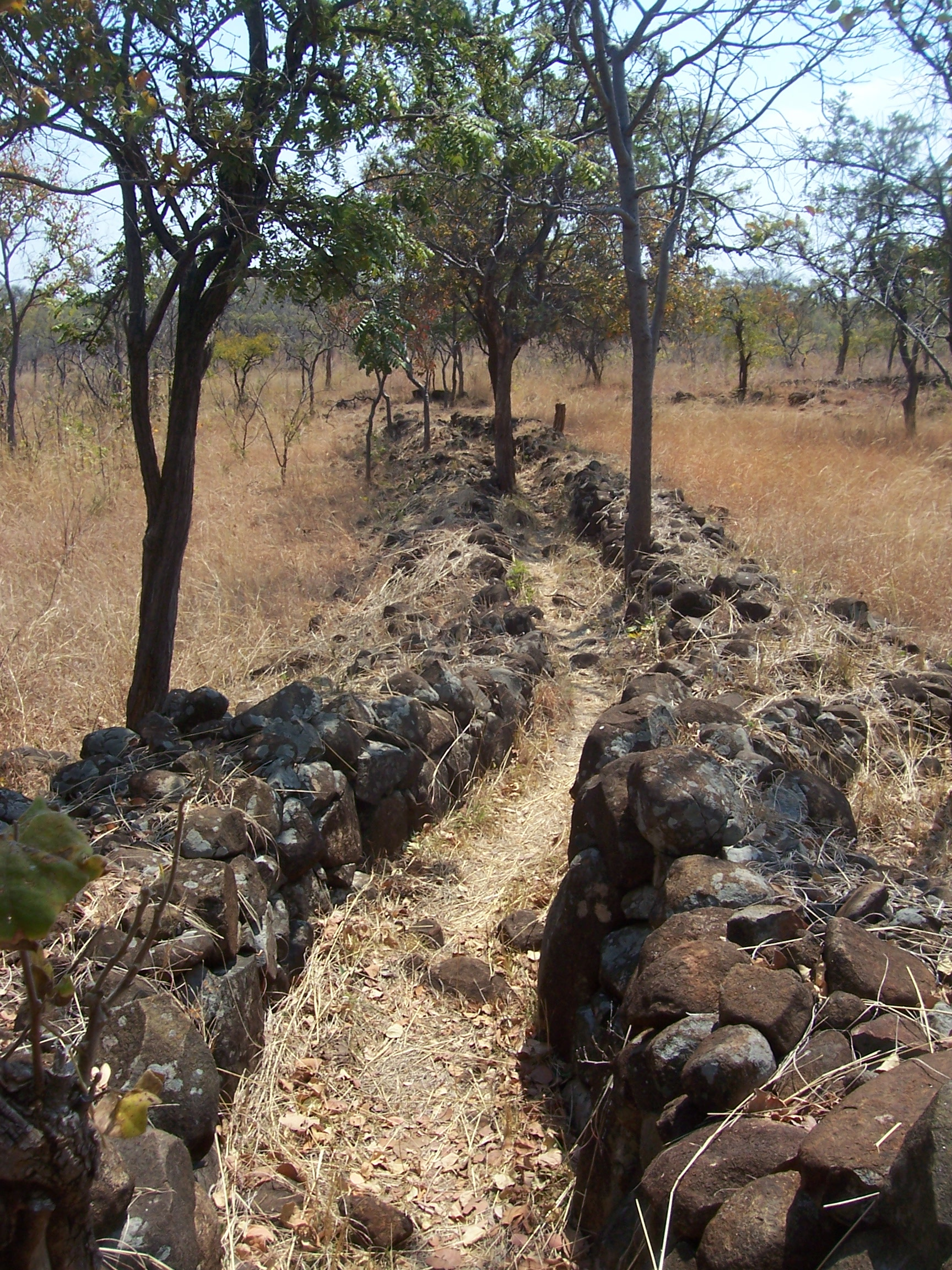
Enclosure double wall

== See also ==
- History of Zimbabwe
- Nyanga, Zimbabwe
- Great Zimbabwe
- Dhlo-Dhlo
- Khami
