= Danamombe =

Archaeological site in Zimbabwe

Coordinates: 19°56′48″S 29°19′53″E

Danamombe is a Zimbabwean archaeological site, about eighty kilometres from Gweru, in the direction of Bulawayo and about 35 kilometres south of the highway. It is not often visited due to the poor quality roads in the area. The remains on the site resemble those of Khami. Nearby are the smaller ruins at Naletale, that were occupied at the same time.

== Etymology ==
Danamombe is the official name according to the National Museums and Monuments of Zimbabwe and has alternative spellings Danangombe, Dananombe and Danan'ombe.

It was formerly known as Dhlo-Dhlo or Ndlo Dlo, which was the Ngoni and Ndebele name in use at the time of the British South Africa Company invasion.

It is unclear whether the name of Danangombe retains elements of the original name, or of the Ngoni name

It is not to be confused with Danangombe Hill near Mutare.

== Layout ==
The town plan follows a similar layout to Khami but is on a smaller scale. It is therefore a deliberate attempt to sustain the society and culture that had been established at Khami. The most extensive foundations are on the highest ground and it appears that all the dwellings were constructed using walls of wood-reinforced mud, as all traces of these have been lost.

== History ==
Danamombe (together with Khami and Naletale) was one of the centres of the Rozvi culture, which had succeeded the Torwa.

The site consists of a ruined town dating from the 17th or 18th century AD, and therefore probably occupied just after the abandonment of the site at Khami.

The site was destroyed in the 1830s when the Matabele arrived in the area. See Mapungubwe, Great Zimbabwe, and Khami.

== Sources and external links ==
- Zimbabwe Khami Ruins from Bulawayo1872
- Zimbabwe History from Africanet
- Zimbabwe Information from Solomons Guide
- Beach, D.N. 1974. Effects of Ndebele raids on Shona power
