= Khami =

Ruined city and capital of the Kingdom of Butua

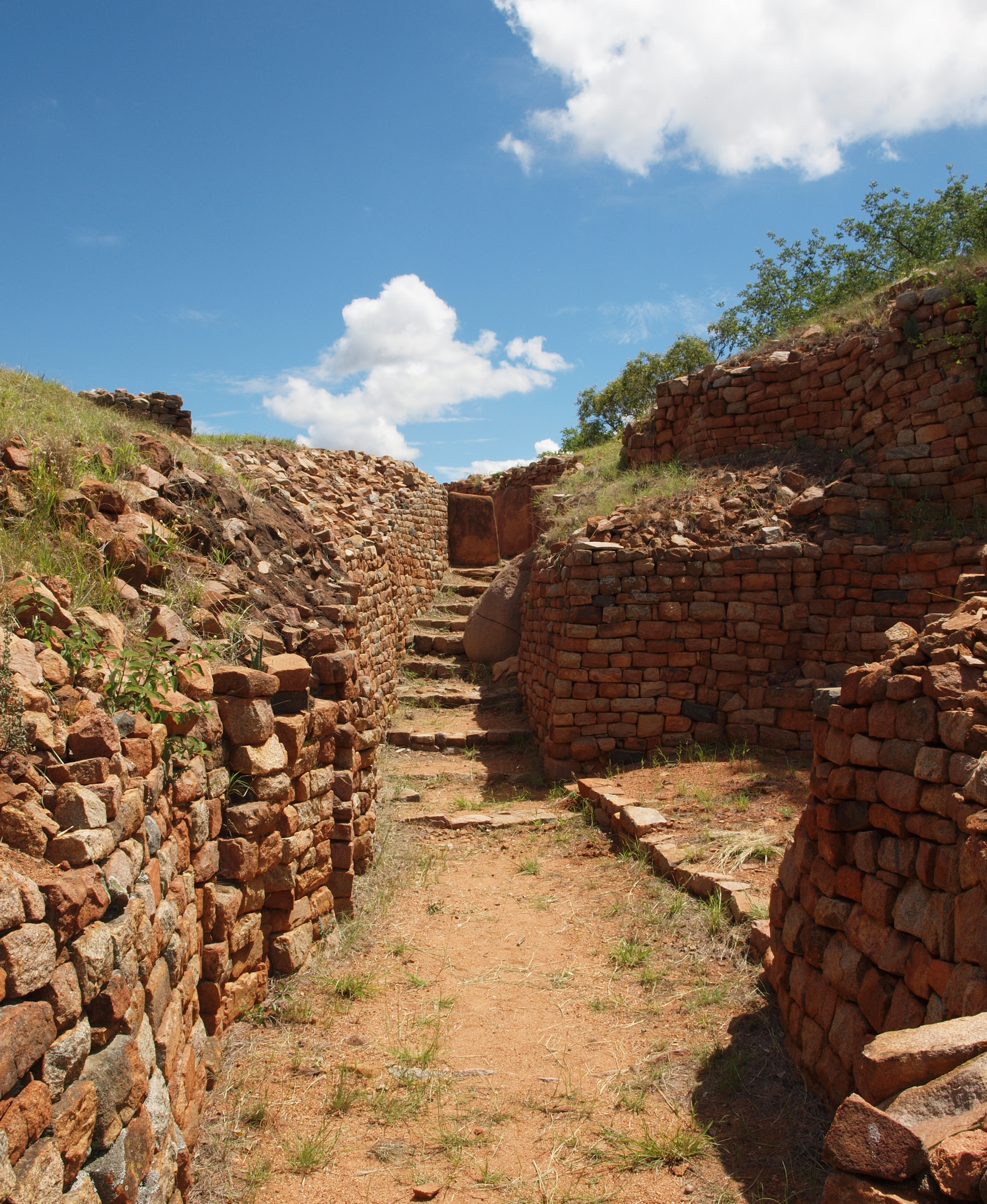
- Ruins of Khami

- Location within Zimbabwe
- 20°08′35.85″S 28°25′24.37″E
- Type: Settlement
- Periods: Late Iron Age
- Cultures: Kingdom of Butua
- Location: Matabeleland North Province, Zimbabwe

UNESCO World Heritage Site
- Official name: Khami Ruins National Monument
- Criteria: Cultural: (iii), (iv)
- Reference: 365
- Inscription: 1986 (10th Session)

Khami (also written as Khame, Kame, or Kami) is a ruined city located 22 kilometres (14 mi) west of Bulawayo, in Zimbabwe. It was once the capital of the Kingdom of Butua of the Torwa dynasty. It is now a national monument and became a UNESCO World Heritage Site in 1986.

== Context ==
The settlement that we see today was a development of the architectural form that emerged at Great Zimbabwe in the 13th century AD and a local Leopard's Kopje culture that built platforms of rough walling on which houses would be constructed. Khami marks an innovation that recognised the environment in which was built. The area around Khami, being riverine, is hot and had problems with malaria. The stone found at Khami (laminar granite) was different from the ones found in other areas of Zimbabwe (biotite). With a mixture of dolerite, this stone was harder to quarry and produced shapeless building stone. It can be estimated that over 60% of the stone produced at these quarries would not be of building quality. The building blocks thus needed to be shaped, but even then the stones were not suitable for building free-standing dry stone walls. The builders thus made an innovation and produced retaining walls instead. Secondly, building platforms made the houses cooler than those in the open areas below. It also eliminated the problem of malaria for the lucky royals who stayed in the built-up areas. The walls are gravity retaining walls built without mortar. Unlike at Great Zimbabwe, some of the walls at Khami have foundations built with huge blocks which would have been lifted by at least four people. Excavations have revealed well-planned buildings especially at the Hill Complex, which was occupied by the king. The complex was first built up by creating terraces of rough walling. These stable walls were then covered up by quality walling of dressed stone blocks. Each terrace was highly decorated with either a checkerboard pattern, herringbone, or a cord pattern. The terraces leaned inwards so that gravity would not cause collapses. The terraces that were created by leaning inwards had wooden poles probably for the guards to hold on to as they walked along the high and steep walls.

== History ==
Khami was the capital of the Torwa dynasty for about 200 years from around 1450 and appears to have been founded at the time of the disappearance of the state at Great Zimbabwe. After that (the traditional date is 1683), it was conquered by Changamire Dombo who led an army of Rozvi rebels from the Mwenemutapa ("Monomotapa") State. Excavations seem to show that the site was not occupied after these Rozvi took over. The Rozvi made another Khami phase site, Danamombe (Dhlo-Dhlo), their new capital. In the 1830s Nguni speaking Ndebele raiders displaced them from Khami and many of the other sites they had established.

The site of Khami reveals seven built-up areas occupied by the royal family with open areas in the valley occupied by the commoners. The complex comprises circular, sometimes terraced, artificial platforms encased by dry stone walls. The beautifully decorated 6m-high by 68m-long retaining wall of the precipice platform bears a checkerboard design along its entire length. The platforms, rising 2–7m above the ground, carried dhaka (clay) huts and courtyards where those of lower status lived. The remnants of cattle kraals and huts for ordinary people can be seen below the Hill Complex. The ruins include a royal enclosure or Hill Complex, which had to be on higher ground than other buildings, stone walls and hut platforms, and also a Christian cross believed to have been placed by a contemporary missionary. There are also ruins on the eastern side of the Khami River. Other platforms are believed to have been cattle kraals and a retaining wall with a chequered pattern. Recent excavations (2000–2006) have revealed that the walls of the western parts of the Hill Complex were all decorated in chequer, herringbone, cord, as well as variegated stone blocks.

== Conservation ==
In the early 2000s, the National Museums and Monuments of Zimbabwe launched a conservation and recording programme whose purpose was to focus on preserving and restoring the stone walls. To date, the notable achievements are the stabilization and restoration of terrace walls on the Main, Cross and North platforms. Between 2000 and 2007, volunteers from the C.H.A.M association participated in a restoration effort.

== Gallery ==
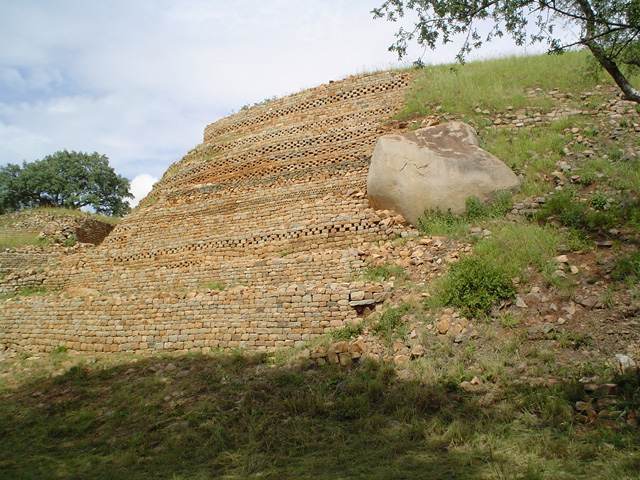
Outer wall of Khami

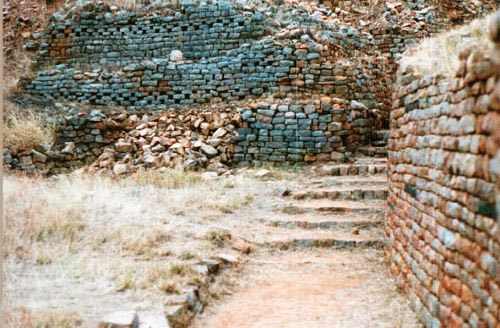
Steps leading into Khami

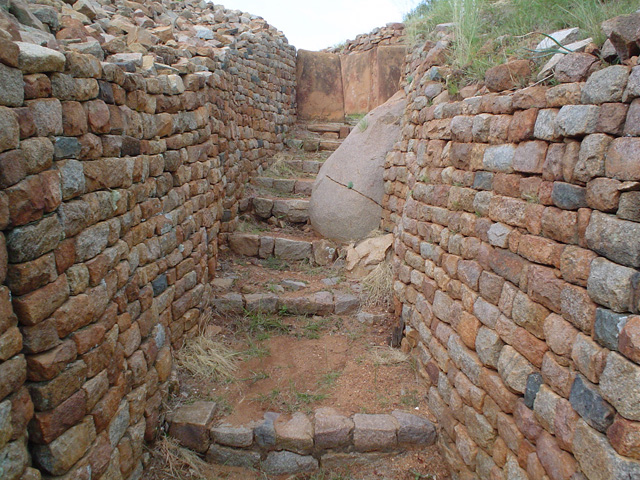
Passageway in Khami

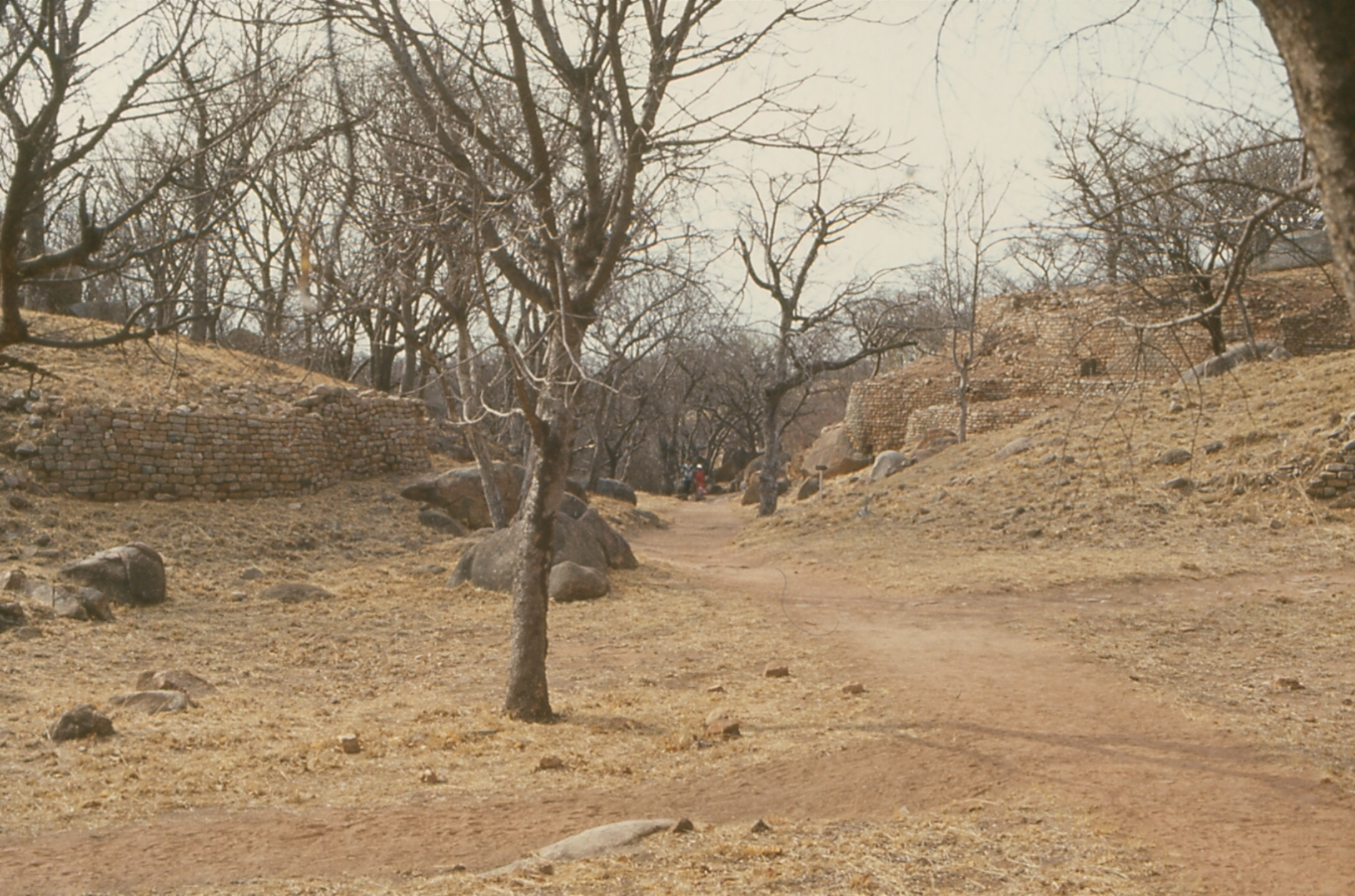
Ruins of Khami

== See also ==
- Ziwa
- List of World Heritage Sites in Africa
- Leopard's Kopje
