= Historiography of Great Zimbabwe =

The history of Great Zimbabwe has largely been reconstructed using archaeological research; though oral traditions pertaining to the site survived into the 20th century, no clear corpus of tradition thought to derive from the site's original population survived near it. The first confirmed visits by Europeans were in the latter 19th century, with investigations of the site starting in 1871. Great Zimbabwe and surrounding sites were looted by European antiquarians between the 1890s and 1920s.

Many 20th-century studies of the site were controversial, as the white government of Rhodesia pressured archaeologists to deny its construction by black Africans. Its African origin did not become consensus among scholars until the 1950s.

== History of research and origins of the ruins ==
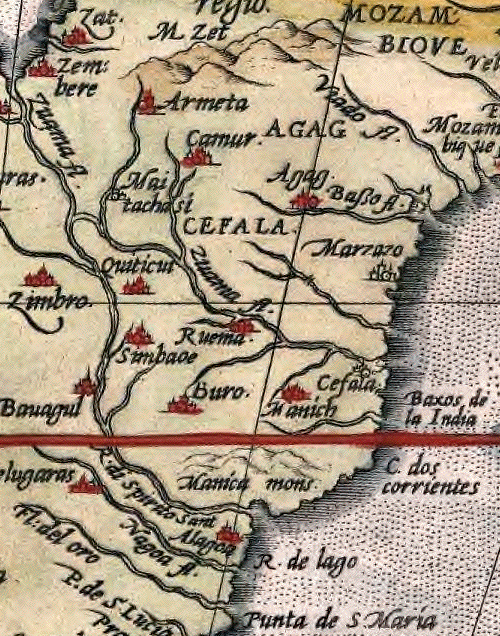
Great Zimbabwe appears on Abraham Ortelius' 1570 map Africae Tabula Nova, rendered "Simbaoe".

There has historically been much debate around the origins of Great Zimbabwe, termed the Zimbabwe Controversy. Mired in racial prejudice, Rhodesians found it inconceivable that the structures could have been built by indigenous Africans, stipulating that archaeological discoveries of Persian bowls and Chinese celadon were the result of pre-Bantu settlement. The colonial government pressured archaeologists to deny that the structure was built by indigenous Africans, because acknowledging it would have dismantled their "civilising mission" rationale. The refutation of various fantastical and dehumanising theories ascribing the construction to Jews, Arabs, Phoenicians, and anyone but the Shona, along with other activities of the antiquarians, dominated the historiography of Great Zimbabwe throughout the 20th century. Its African origin only became consensus by the 1950s.

=== From Portuguese traders to Karl Mauch ===
The first European visit may have been made by the Portuguese traveler António Fernandes in 1513–1515, who crossed twice and reported in detail the region of present-day Zimbabwe (including the Shona kingdoms) and also fortified centers in stone without mortar. However, passing en route a few kilometres north, and about 56 km (35 mi) south of the site, he did not make a reference to Great Zimbabwe. Portuguese traders heard about the remains of the medieval city in the early 16th century, and records survive of interviews and notes made by some of them, linking Great Zimbabwe to gold production and long-distance trade. Two of those accounts mention an inscription above the entrance to Great Zimbabwe, written in characters not known to the Arab merchants who had seen it.

In 1506, the explorer Diogo de Alcáçova described the edifices in a letter to Manuel I of Portugal, writing that they were part of the larger kingdom of Ucalanga (presumably Karanga, a dialect of the Shona people spoken mainly in Masvingo and Midlands provinces of Zimbabwe). João de Barros left another such description of Great Zimbabwe in 1538, as recounted to him by Moorish traders who had visited the area and possessed knowledge of the hinterland. He indicates that the edifices were locally known as Symbaoe, which meant "royal court" in the vernacular. As to the actual identity of the builders of Great Zimbabwe, de Barros writes:

When and by whom, these edifices were raised, as the people of the land are ignorant of the art of writing, there is no record, but they say they are the work of the devil, for in comparison with their power and knowledge it does not seem possible to them that they should be the work of man.

— João de Barros

Additionally, with regard to the purpose of the Great Zimbabwe ruins, de Barros asserted that: "in the opinion of the Moors who saw it [Great Zimbabwe] it is very ancient and was built to keep possessions of the mines, which are very old, and no gold has been extracted from them for years, because of the wars ... it would seem that some prince who has possession of these mines ordered it to be built as a sign thereof, which he afterwards lost in the course of time and through their being so remote from his kingdom".

De Barros further remarked that Symbaoe "is guarded by a nobleman, who has charge of it, after the manner of a chief alcaide, and they call this officer Symbacayo ... and there are always some of Benomotapa's wives therein of whom Symbacayo takes care." Thus, Great Zimbabwe appears to have still been inhabited as recently as the early 16th century.

=== Early European rediscovery and biblical interpretations ===
The ruins were rediscovered by Europeans during a hunting trip in 1867 by Adam Render, a German-American hunter, prospector and trader in southern Africa, who had been living with a local tribe. In 1871 he showed the ruins to Karl Mauch, a German explorer and geographer of Africa. Karl Mauch recorded the ruins and immediately discounted any possibility of native construction and proceeded to speculate about a possible Biblical association with King Solomon and the Queen of Sheba, an explanation which had been suggested by earlier writers such as the Portuguese João dos Santos. Mauch went so far as to favour a legend that the structures were built to replicate the palace of the Queen of Sheba in Jerusalem, and claimed a wooden lintel at the site must be Lebanese cedar, brought by Phoenicians. The Sheba legend, as promoted by Mauch, became so pervasive in the white settler community as to cause the later scholar James Theodore Bent to say,

The names of King Solomon and the Queen of Sheba were on everybody's lips, and have become so distasteful to us that we never expect to hear them again without an involuntary shudder.

=== Looting and early destruction of the site ===
A series of looters followed Mauch's visit to the ruins, some employed by W.G. Neal who famously operated the Ancient Ruins Company. The first looter who found his way to the site, Willi Posselt, removed a native-made soapstone bird and managed to conceal others to retrieve at a later date. Over the following several years Neal and his company plundered the ruins, stripping it of anything of value and destroying what they presumably could not take to sell, including structures. It is unclear how much pottery, figurines and other artefacts were lost or stolen.

=== Early excavations and possible non-African origins ===
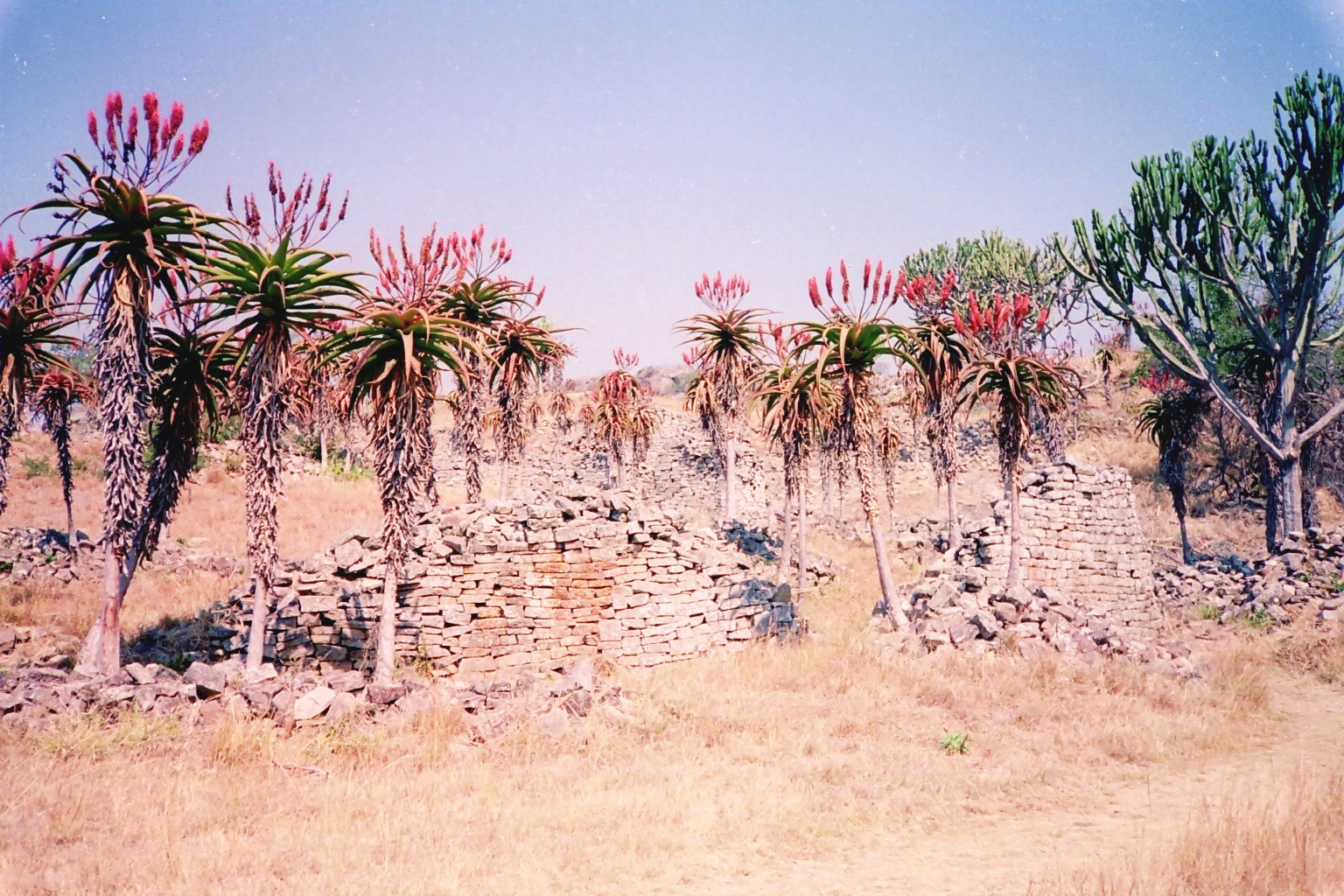
The Valley Complex

Carl Peters collected a ceramic ushabti in 1905. Flinders Petrie examined it and identified a cartouche on its chest as belonging to the 18th Dynasty Egyptian Pharaoh Thutmose III and suggested that it was a statuette of the king and cited it as proof of commercial ties between rulers in the area and the ancient Egyptians during the New Kingdom (c. 1550–1077 BC), if not a relic of an old Egyptian station near the local gold mines. Johann Heinrich Schäfer later appraised the statuette, and argued that it belonged to a well-known group of forgeries. After having received the ushabti, Felix von Luschan suggested that it was of more recent origin than the New Kingdom. He asserted that the figurine instead appeared to date to the subsequent Ptolemaic era (c. 323–30 BC), when Alexandria-based Greek merchants would export Egyptian antiquities and pseudo-antiquities to southern Africa.

J. Theodore Bent, with his wife Mabel, undertook a season at Zimbabwe with Cecil Rhodes's patronage and funding from the Royal Geographical Society and the British Association for the Advancement of Science. This, and other excavations undertaken for Rhodes, resulted in a book publication that introduced the ruins to English readers. Bent had no formal archaeological training, but by 1891 he had travelled widely in Greece and Asia Minor and had excavated (1889) the Mounds of A'ali, Bahrain. This lack of training likely contributed to his decision to recklessly dig in the conical tower of the Great Enclosure, which would subsequently ruin the stratigraphy of the environment. This in turn made it impossible for any archaeologist who came after him to determine the tower's age. Several artefacts were lost during this visit as well, this time being discarded as insignificant. Bent was aided by the expert cartographer and surveyor Robert M. W. Swan (1858–1904), who also visited and surveyed a host of related stone ruins nearby. Bent stated in the first edition of his book The Ruined Cities of Mashonaland (1892) that the ruins revealed either the Phoenicians or the Arabs as builders, and he favoured the possibility of great antiquity for the fortress. In the Preface to his second edition (1893) he was more specific, with his primary theory being "a Semitic race and of Arabian origin" of "strongly commercial" traders living within a client African city.

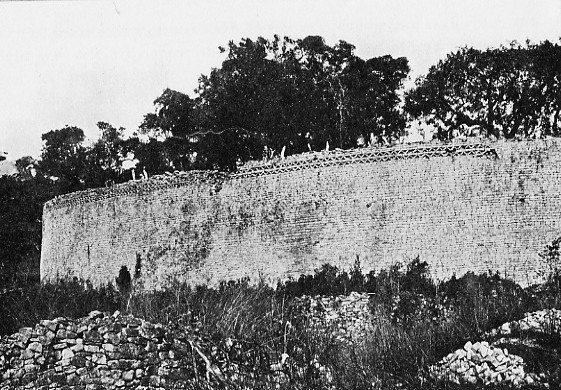
Exterior wall of the Great Enclosure. Picture taken by David Randall-MacIver in 1906.

=== The Lemba ===
The construction of Great Zimbabwe is also claimed by the Lemba, as documented by William Bolts in 1777 (to the Austrian Habsburg authorities), and by an A. A. Anderson (writing about his travels north of the Limpopo River in the 19th century). Lemba speak the Bantu languages spoken by their geographic neighbours, but they have some religious practices and beliefs similar to those in Judaism and Islam, which they claim were transmitted by oral tradition.

=== First scientific excavations ===
The first scientific archaeological excavations at the site were undertaken by David Randall-MacIver for the British Association in 1905–1906. In Medieval Rhodesia, he rejected the claims made by Adam Render, Carl Peters and Karl Mauch, and instead wrote of the existence in the site of objects that were of Bantu origin. Randall-MacIver concluded that all available evidence led him to believe that the Zimbabwe structures were constructed by the ancestors of the Shona people. More importantly he suggested a wholly medieval date for the walled fortifications and temple. This claim was not immediately accepted, partly due to the relatively short and undermanned period of excavation he was able to undertake.

=== Archaeological Confirmation of African Origins ===
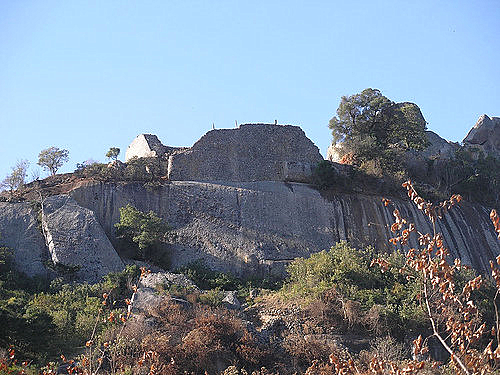
The Hill Complex

In mid-1929, Gertrude Caton Thompson concluded, after a twelve-day visit of a three-person team and the digging of several trenches, that the site was indeed created by Bantu. She had first sunk three test pits into what had been refuse heaps on the upper terraces of the hill complex, producing a mix of unremarkable pottery and ironwork. She then moved to the Conical Tower and tried to dig under the tower, arguing that the ground there would be undisturbed, but nothing was revealed. Some further test trenches were then put down outside the lower Great Enclosure and in the Valley Ruins, which unearthed domestic ironwork, glass beads, and a gold bracelet. Caton Thompson immediately announced her Bantu origin theory to a meeting of the British Association in Johannesburg.

Examination of all the existing evidence, gathered from every quarter, still can produce not one single item that is not in accordance with the claim of Bantu origin and medieval date

Caton Thompson's claim was not immediately favoured, although it had strong support among some scientific archaeologists due to her modern methods. Her most important contribution was in helping to confirm the theory of a medieval origin for the masonry work of the 14th and 15th centuries. By 1931, she had modified her Bantu theory somewhat, allowing for a possible Arabian influence for the towers through the imitation of buildings or art seen at coastal Arabian trading cities.

=== Modern archaeological consensus and dating evidence ===
Since the 1950s, there has been consensus among archaeologists as to the African origins of Great Zimbabwe. Artefacts and radiocarbon dating indicate settlement in at least the 5th century, with continuous settlement of Great Zimbabwe between the 12th and 15th centuries and the bulk of the finds from the 15th century. The radiocarbon evidence is a suite of 28 measurements, for which all but the first four, from the early days of the use of that method and since viewed as inaccurate, support the 12th-to-15th-centuries chronology. In the 1970s, a beam that produced some of the anomalous dates in 1952 was reanalysed and gave a 14th-century date. Dated finds such as Chinese, Persian and Syrian artefacts also support the 12th- and 15th-century dates.

=== Gokomere ===
Archaeologists generally agree that the builders spoke one of the Shona languages, based upon evidence of pottery, oral traditions and anthropology and DNA evidence and recent scholarship supports the construction of Great Zimbabwe (and the origin of its culture) by Shona and Venda peoples, who were probably descended from the Gokomere culture. The Gokomere culture, an eastern Bantu subgroup, existed in the area from around 200 AD and flourished from 500 AD to about 800 AD. Archaeological evidence indicates that it constitutes an early phase of the Great Zimbabwe culture. The Gokomere culture likely gave rise to both the modern Mashona people, an ethnic cluster comprising distinct sub-ethnic groups such as the local Karanga clan and the Rozwi culture, which originated as several Shona states. Gokomere peoples were probably also related to certain nearby early Bantu groups like the Mapungubwe civilisation of neighbouring North eastern South Africa, which is believed to have been an early Venda-speaking culture, and to the nearby Sotho.

=== Recent research ===
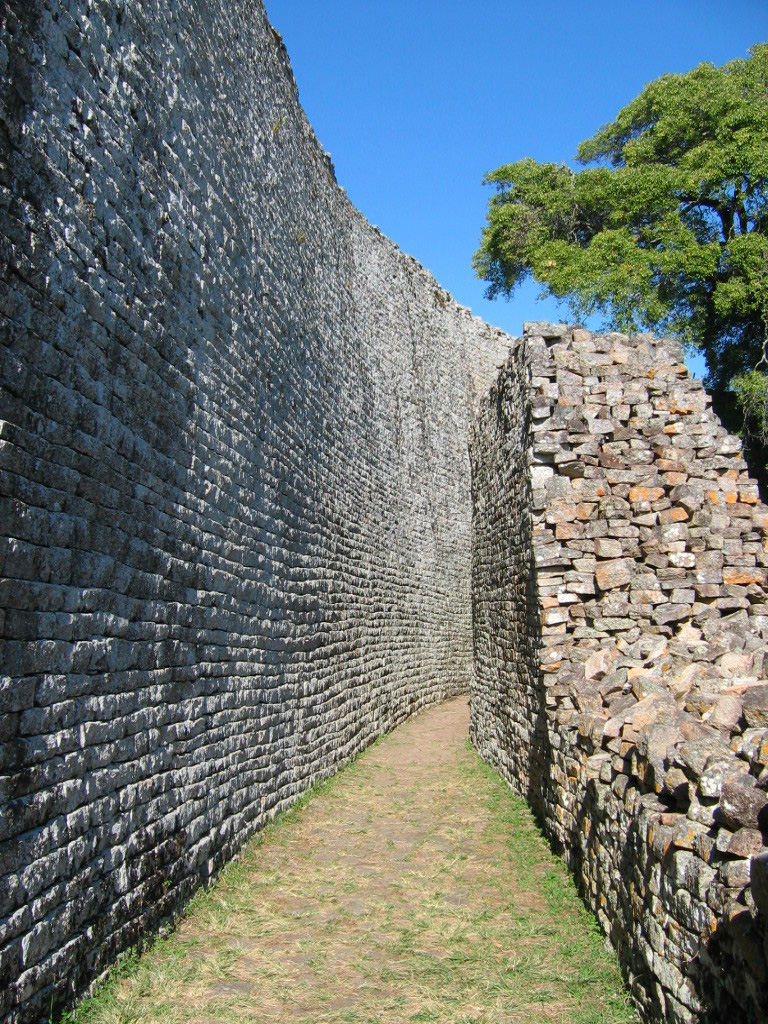
Passageway in the Great Enclosure

More recent archaeological work has been carried out by Peter Garlake, who has produced the comprehensive descriptions of the site, David Beach and Thomas Huffman, who have worked on the chronology and development of Great Zimbabwe and Gilbert Pwiti, who has published extensively on trade links. Today, the most recent consensus attributes the construction of Great Zimbabwe to the Shona people (a Bantu group). Some evidence also suggests an early influence from the peoples of the Mapungubwe civilization.

=== Damage to the ruins ===
Damage to the ruins has taken place throughout the last century. European antiquarians looted and pillaged Great Zimbabwe and similar structures from the 1890s to 1920s, greatly inhibiting the work of future archaeologists by destroying its stratigraphy. The removal of gold and artefacts in amateurist diggings by early colonial antiquarians caused widespread damage, notably diggings by Richard Nicklin Hall. More extensive damage was caused by the mining of some of the ruins for gold. Reconstruction attempts since 1980 caused further damage, leading to alienation of the local communities from the site. A continuing source of damage to the ruins has been visitation, with many cases of people climbing the walls, walking over archaeological deposits, and overusing paths, all of which have significantly affected structures at the site. This anthropogenic damage has combined with that from natural causes including erosion, settling of foundations, and damage from plant growth.

== Oral traditions ==
Although Shona oral traditions concerning the construction of Great Zimbabwe continued into the 20th century, none are thought to have survived in the area surrounding it. In the 1980s, Ken Mufuka was tasked by the nascent Zimbabwean government with writing a national history of Great Zimbabwe as a riposte to colonial historiography, for which he utilised oral sources, publishing Dzimbahwe: Life and Politics in the Golden Age 1100–1500 AD in 1983. (Note: Writing in 2005, he said that the shrine in the Hill Complex was the home of spirit mediums (svikiro) who were tasked with acting as the conscience of the state. Accordingly they also preserved the traditions of the founders, who he says were Chigwagu Rusvingo (the first mambo), Chaminuka, Chimurenga, Tovera, and Soro-rezhou among others (see mhondoro).) Mufuka's methodology was strongly criticised by Peter Garlake among others for its purported use of creative license and over-reliance on mythology. In the late-20th century, Thomas Huffman consulted oral sources near the site, Venda and Shona anthropology, and cognitive archaeology in his reconstruction of Great Zimbabwe's history. David Beach criticised his work, and wrote that oral traditions from the original site's population did not survive, largely due to conquests of the entire region by Shona from the north and west in the 18th century, who lacked political incentive to maintain or incorporate them. Several scholars commented in support of Beach's critique, however Innocent Pikirayi tentatively considered it possible that original traditions were "grafted" onto later ones.
