= Thimlich Ohinga =

National Monument of Kenya

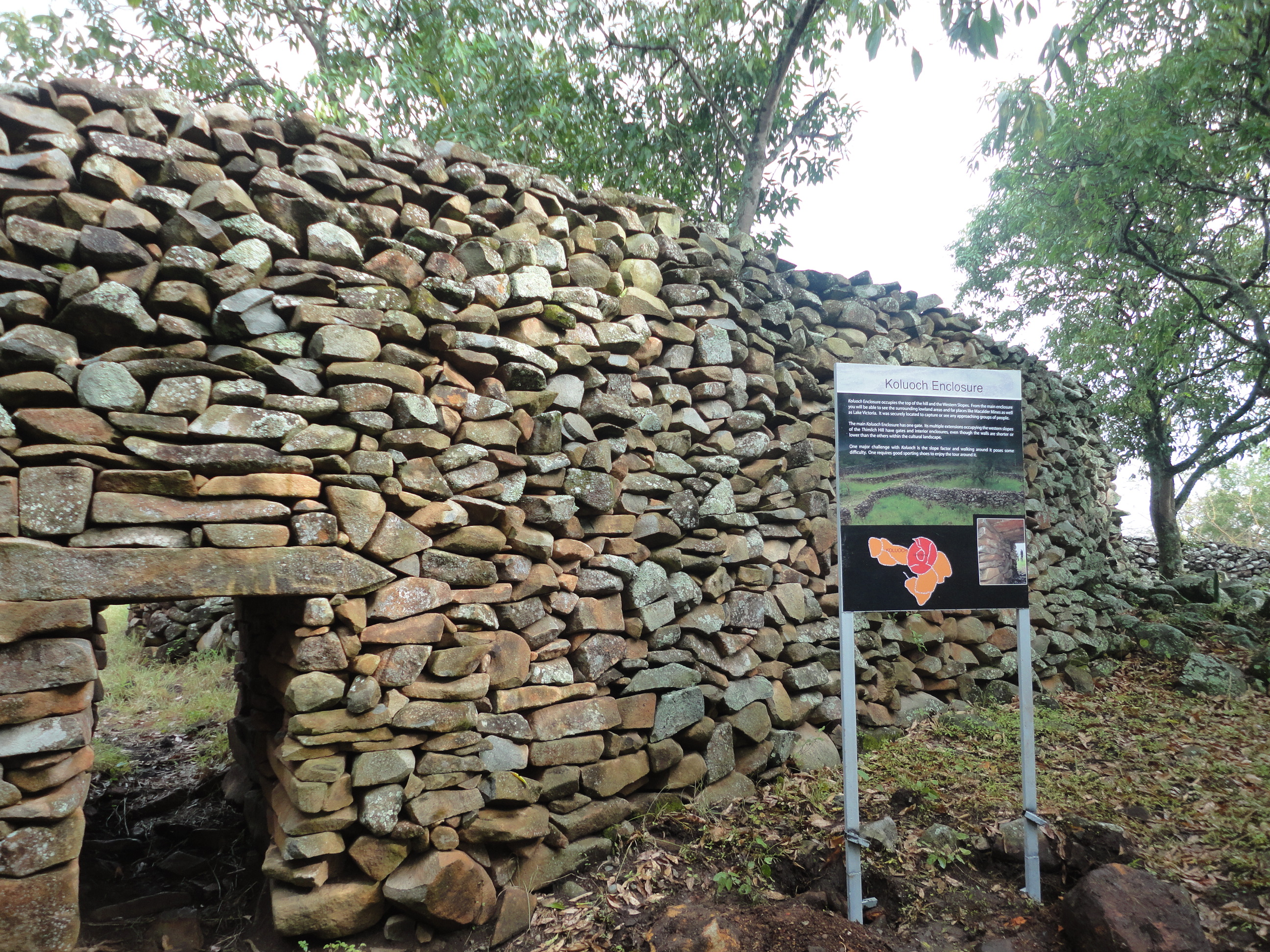
- Thimlich Ohinga

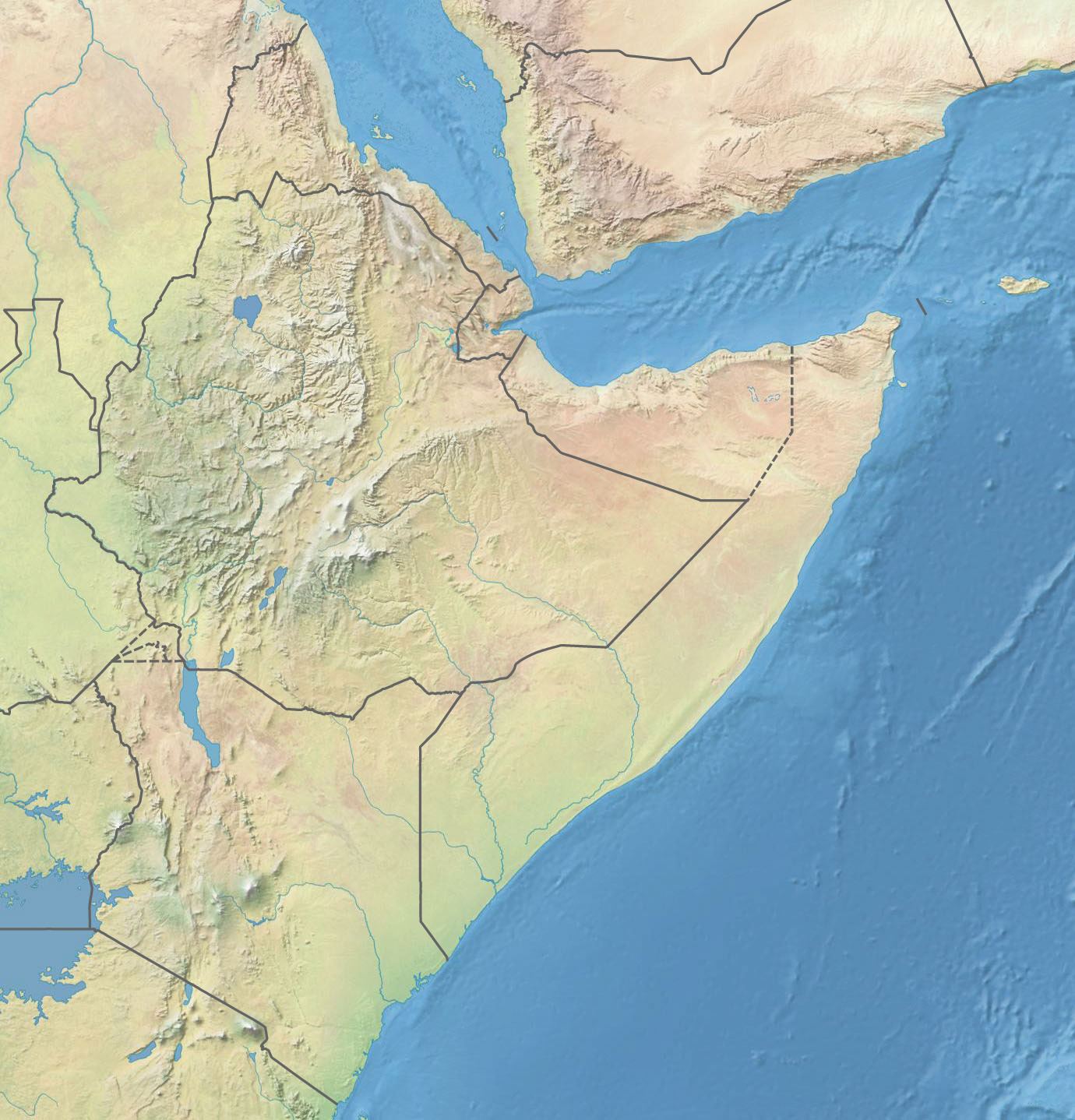
- Location within Kenya Location within Horn of Africa
- 0.891101°S 34.325173°E
- Location: Migori County, Kenya

UNESCO World Heritage Site
- Official name: Thimlich Ohinga Archaeological Site
- Type: Cultural
- Criteria: (iii), (iv), (v)
- Designated: 2018 (42nd session)
- Reference no.: 1450
- Region: Africa

Thimlich Ohinga is a complex of stone-built ruins in Migori County in Kenya. It is the largest of 138 sites containing 521 stone structures that were built near Lake Victoria in Kenya. These sites are highly clustered. The main enclosure of Thimlich Ohinga has walls that are 1–3 m (3.3–9.8 ft) in thickness, and 1–4.2 m (3.3–13.8 ft) in height. The structures were built from undressed blocks, rocks, and stones set in place without mortar. The densely packed stones interlock. The site is believed to date to the 15th century or earlier.

== Etymology ==
Neville Chittick, the former Director of the British Institute of History and Archaeology in East Africa, documented the site in the 1960s. Researchers from the National Museums of Kenya commenced work on the site in 1980. Once called "Liare Valley" after a valley to the north-east of the area, Thimlich Ohinga was gazetted as a Kenyan National Monument under its new name in 1981. The name was changed because "Liare Valley" did not describe the exact location of the site. The area is occupied by the Luo people. Thimlich means "frightening dense forest" and Ohinga means "a large fortress" in Dholuo, the language of the Luo people.

== Location ==
Thimlich Ohinga is located 181 km (112 mi) south of Kisumu in Migori county, on a gentle sloping hill 46 km (29 mi) north-west of Migori town near Macalder's Mines. The other 137 sites that resemble it are concentrated in the areas of Karungu, Kadem-Kanyamkago, Gwassi, Kaksingiri Lake headlands, Kanyidoto and Kanyamwa.

== Purpose ==
The scale of Thimlich Ohinga and related structures points to an organised community that could mobilise labour and resources. The readily available rocks from the local environment provided the materials with which the enclosures were constructed. Luo oral traditions state that the enclosures were built for protection against wild animals, cattle rustlers and other hostile groups. These traditions suggest that Thimlich Ohinga was constructed by the then-inhabitants to serve as protection against outsiders in the Kadem and Kanyamwa areas, as well as from neighbouring ethnic groups from Tanzania. Aside from being a defensive fort, Thimlich Ohinga was also an economic, religious, and social hub.

== Builders and inhabitants ==
Accurate dating of the site remains inconclusive. Quatz flakes of the late Stone Age type have been found on the site and presumed to predate it. Some debate exists with regard to the origin and builders of Thimlich Ohinga and the other stone walled settlements. However, given that all current historical, linguistic and genetic evidence indicates that a high degree of population movement and admixture occurred in pre-colonial and colonial times, simple inferences to the ethnic or linguistic identity of the builders of this site are tenuous at best. Archaeological and historical studies have concluded that the original builders and later inhabitants maintained a pastoral tradition where cattle played a key role in the economy. These studies also conclude that sociopolitical organisation also played a crucial role in the establishment of Thimlich Ohinga and other surrounding fortified structures.

The sites were occupied in waves. Oral histories suggest that the earliest inhabitants were a Bantu speaking people prior to the migration of Nilotic speaking groups. Archaeological and ethnographic analysis of the sites has shown that the spatial organisation most closely resembles the layout of traditional Luo homesteads. For example, Luo homesteads are circular with a focal meeting point adjacent to a central livestock enclosure, a pattern observable in Thimlich Ohinga. Pottery recovered on the sites also demonstrate specific decorative patterns commonly found among Western Nilotic speakers (Luo) and not among Bantu speakers. These findings suggest that the inhabitants of these structures also contributed to the ancestry of present-day inhabitants of the area who identify as members of the Luo community. For reasons yet unknown, Thimlich Ohinga was abandoned by the original builders. Over time, other communities moved into the area in the period between the 15th and the 19th centuries and those who lived within the complexes maintained them by repairing and modifying the structures. The re-occupation and repair did not interfere with the preservation of the structures. The site was vacated for the last time during the first half of the twentieth century as the colonial administration established peace and order in the region. The families living in the enclosures moved out into individual homesteads using euphorbia instead of stone as fencing material. A shift in mindset occurred as the local community moved from a communal living set-up to a more individualistic one.

== Architectural style ==
The architectural style of the Thimlich Ohinga mirrors the building style of Great Zimbabwe, 3,100 km (1,900 mi) to the south in Zimbabwe, albeit smaller in size. One striking difference between the two is unlike Great Zimbabwe, Thimlich Ohinga was constructed using unshaped and random loose stones made from local basalt. At both sites, mortar and dressing were not used and therefore great care and skill was needed to ensure stability. The walls at Thimlich Ohinga are free standing, 1 m (3.3 ft) thick with no dug foundation. They are 0.5–4.5 m (1.6–14.8 ft) in height. The ovoid walls intersect with each other in a curved and zigzag fashion, using intermittent buttresses to add stability. Similar enclosures found in Northern Nyanza have other features such as rock pillars and stone linings. The gates have stone lintels and engraved markings.

Thimlich Ohinga is an example of defensive savanna architecture, which eventually became a traditional style in various parts of East and Southern Africa. Taken together with the other stone built enclosures, Thimlich Ohinga creates the impression of a society with a centralised system of control and communal lifestyle that spread around the Lake Victoria region. Later forms of this stone-walled architecture can be seen on some traditional houses in Western and South-Western Kenya.

== Internal features ==
A watchtower constructed from raised rocks is found immediately after the entrance. There are three entrances to the main monument at Thimlich Ohinga with one west facing and two east facing. The structures are partitioned into corridors, several smaller enclosures and depressions. Circular depressions and raised platforms are found where the houses within the enclosures were constructed. The main monument has six house pits and five enclosures within it. The north-eastern side of the main enclosure at Thimlich Ohinga has a recreational games section where a Mancala like board game, locally known as ajua, is curved into the rock surface. Grinding stones for grain are also found at the site. Livestock pens for cattle, sheep, goats, chicken, guinea fowl with retaining walls for gardens were also built. Animal remains on the site include domestic and wild species such as cattle, ovicaprids (sheep and goats), chicken, fish, hartebeest (Kongoni), duiker and hare. The entryways were intentionally constructed as small passageways, so that potential intruders could be quickly subdued by guards stationed on the watchtower near the entrance. The watchtower gives a good view of the whole complex and surrounding area. The enclosures also feature smaller side forts which contained houses, dining areas, animal pens, and granaries. An iron smith was present at Thimlich Ohinga. Iron slag, smoking bellows and iron objects have been found in a partially walled area next to the main enclosure. Imported glass beads at the site indicate that Thimlich Ohinga was part of a network of long-distance trade.

== Conservation ==
The Kenya Wildlife Service, and the National Museums of Kenya have designated Thimlich Ohinga as a conservation site. Wild animals like guinea fowl, various species of monkeys, birds and antelope live in the forests surrounding the site. The National Museums of Kenya submitted a request to UNESCO, on behalf of the government, to include the Thimlich Ohinga Cultural Landscape on the World Heritage Site list. The location became a World Heritage Site in 2018.

== See also ==
- Similar ruins outside Kenya
  - Blaauboschkraal stone ruins in Mpumalanga, South Africa
  - Bumbusi in Zimbabwe
  - Danangombe in Zimbabwe
  - Engaruka in Tanzania
  - Great Zimbabwe in Zimbabwe
  - Khami in Zimbabwe
  - Kweneng' Ruins in South Africa
  - Leopard's Kopje in Zimbabwe
  - Machadodorp baKoni Ruins in Mpumalanga, South Africa
  - Manyikeni in Mozambique
  - Mapungubwe in Limpopo, South Africa
  - Naletale in Zimbabwe
  - Ziwa in Zimbabwe
