= Adam Render =

German-American hunter, prospector and trader in Africa

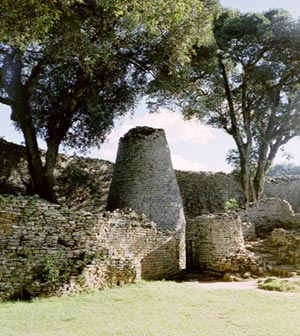
Part of Great Zimbabwe

Adam Stanley Renders (surname often recorded as Render; 1822–1881) was a German-American hunter, prospector and trader in southern Africa who is generally recorded as the first European to see the medieval city of Great Zimbabwe, having inadvertently come across the ruins while hunting big game in 1867. He subsequently guided the explorer and geographer Karl Mauch during the first archaeological expedition to the site in 1871, and also discovered prehistoric gold mines in the region.

== Biography ==
Born in Germany in 1822, Renders lived in the United States from early childhood until about 1842, when he emigrated to Natal in South Africa. He joined the Boer Voortrekkers and allegedly fought with them against the British at the Battle of Boomplaats in 1848. The same year Renders is believed to have settled in Zoutpansberg in the north-east of the Transvaal. He married Willem Andries Petrus Pretorius's daughter Elsje Magdalina Josina Pretorius, and hunted and traded on both sides of the Limpopo River. During one of his big-game hunting trips north of the river in 1867, he inadvertently came across the ruins of Great Zimbabwe, a medieval walled city that had been abandoned for centuries; scholarly consensus records him as the first white man to see this place.

Renders deserted his wife and 4 children (Helena Barendina Norbetta Renders 1863–1889, Jan Adam Renders 1864–?, Willem Andries Petrus Renders 1866–1943 and Hendrik Jacobus Renders 1869–1947) in 1868 following a series of quarrels. He relocated north of the Limpopo and "went native", living about 20 kilometres (12 mi) south-east of Great Zimbabwe with the daughter of a local chief for the rest of his life. He apparently made little effort to report his discovery of Great Zimbabwe to other Westerners. Continuing to informally explore the region, he found a number of ancient gold mines.

In 1871, Renders hosted the German explorer and geographer Karl Mauch, who had heard of Great Zimbabwe and come to the area hoping to make the first archaeological study. Mauch stayed with Renders for nine months, making a number of study excursions to the ruins during that time. In stark contrast to Renders, Mauch sent flamboyant descriptions of the site to the overseas press, claiming that the site was a replica of Solomon's Temple and that he had found the land of Ophir described in the Bible. As the first Westerner to report on Great Zimbabwe, it was Mauch who received most of the credit for finding it. Renders died in obscurity in 1881.

Great Zimbabwe has been marked by UNESCO as a World Heritage Site since 1988.
