= Chibuene =

Archaeological site in Mozambique

- Ruins of Chibuene
- 22°2′57.37″S 35°19′26.75″E
- Location: Mozambique

Chibuene is a Mozambican archaeological site, located five kilometres south of the coastal city of Vilanculos South Beach. The site was occupied during two distinct phases. The earlier phase of occupation dates to the late first millennium AD. The second phase dates from around 1450 and is contemporaneous with the Great Zimbabwe civilization in the African interior. During both phases of its development Chibuene was a trading settlement. Trade goods obtained from the site include glass beads, painted blue and white ceramics, and glass bottle fragments. The later phase of settlement has yielded remains of medieval structures as well as evidence of metallurgy. Crucibles have been found that were presumably used to melt gold obtained from trade with the Great Zimbabwe civilization. There is evidence that Chibuene traded extensively with the inland settlement of Manyikeni. Mozambique has jointly inscribed these two properties on their tentative version of the World Heritage List.

== Overview ==
The archaeological site was occupied from approximately AD 600 to AD 1700 continuously and into the present, intermittently. This site participated in the Indian Ocean trade network and is currently the most southern located site on the eastern African coast. Archaeological samples at the site revealed that Chibuene's occupation contained two major periods of occupation. The objects presented in the lower deposits contained glazed and unglazed pottery, glass, iron fragments, and beads made of shell and glass. The upper layers contained a distinguishable change in ceramic typology. In addition, two types of imported glazed pottery have been recovered from the site. The main subsistence pattern of the inhabitants of the site appeared to derive from the coast which included fish, marine mammals, and reptiles. Additionally, contemporary farmers in the region produce maize, sorghum, manioc, beans, and peanuts.

The lower layers of occupation contained the presence of early Matola pottery typically associated with early farming communities in the region. In addition to glass beads which revealed the locations importance as an entry point for glass which later found its way into the interior by the end of the first millennium AD. The site likely contributed to glass beads presented in sites within Shashe River and Limpopo River regions, the Zimbabwe Plateau, and Botswana to about AD 1000. The considerable amount of glass and shell recovered in the lower occupation deposits suggested the site trading extensively within the Indian Ocean trade network in the late first millennium AD.

Manyikeni, a Zimbabwean traditional style of stone walled settlement 10 km west of Chibuene, possibly gained control of the site after AD 1200. This is attested by the increased similarity of later occupation deposits containing pottery similar in character to Manyikeni. In addition, this is corroborated by the presence of marine shell and imports from Indian ocean trade in the context of Manyikeni deposits suggesting the coast and hinterlands were connected through trade networks. Chibuene acted as the way point for entry of materials and resources from the eastern coast and the trade network it provided.

== Subsistence economy ==
The current estimate for the development of the site is estimated to be around 400 AD as a farming community on the southern coast of Mozambique. Contemporary annual and seasonal rainfall reveals very high variability in the region with most of the rainfall arriving in December and February, averaging 832 mm/per year. The summer rainfall season experiences decadal cycles of wet and dry phases. The high variability of rainfall appears to have remained consistent throughout the last 1600 years. Pollen evidence from the surrounding lakes of Nhaucati and Xiroche suggests a lengthy period of drought between 1400 and 1700, peaking in 1700. This drought accompanied a dramatic change in vegetation cover from forest savanna mosaic to forest savanna woodland. Furthermore, the surrounding area contains relatively nutrient poor dunal sand, susceptible to erosion.

Agriculture was introduced to the region around 400 AD to the present. Poor soil and the unreliability of rainfall reduced the viability of agriculture as a reliable subsistence pattern. Throughout the course of the occupation of Chibuene, the inhabitants practiced a broad subsistence economy with the utilization of domestic animals, marine fauna, and wild plant life to augment agricultural production. Of particular significance to the site was the distinctive emphasis on marine fauna in the diets of the inhabitants. The 1995 excavations from a Swedish sponsored team revealed a rather high proportion of fish remains in comparison to sites in South Africa. The faunal remains of shark and turtle were notable features of the site. Shark fishing and turtle hunting are subsistence strategies more associated with East African, or Swahili coast, sites beginning in the first millennium, revealing a closer affinity of Chibuene to sites further north than the southern interior. The oldest layers of the site contained a high volume of shellfish. In addition domesticated animals such as cattle, sheep, goats, and chickens are represented at the site which attests to an association with southern African sites. Despite the availability of domesticated animals, it appeared that shellfish consisted of the bulk of the protein utilized by the inhabitants of Chibuene.

The introduction of domesticated chicken illustrates the site’s importance for trade between the Indian Ocean and the southern interior as a possible route of entry for the black-feathered variety of chicken resembling those of India. Thus, the inhabitants of the site made extensive use of their location along the southern Mozambican coast. The poor soil composition and inadequate rainfall only allowed variable agricultural output, causing the inhabitants to procure other means of sustenance. Chibuene inhabitants made use of domesticated animals from southern Africa and successful shark and turtle hunting practices from neighbors from the north in order to adequately exploit the resources of the particular region they inhabited with easy access to the coast and variable land for pasturage in addition to invaluable trade resources procured from the Indian Ocean trade network.

== Adaptive strategies and agriculture ==
In the initial years of occupation between 400 and 700 AD clearing of land for agriculture remained relatively small. The years following saw a degree of agricultural intensification between 600 and 1000 AD, but there is no evidence for clearing on a massive scale. Trade played an important role in this period for procuring valuable commodities such as glass and additional food stuffs. Faunal assemblages revealed much more of an emphasis on cattle herding in these early years, although not on a large-scale due to the low availability of pastoral lands. Cattle were possibly traded with the interior to procure extra grain stuffs in times of need. In these years, the landscape was covered in riverine forests and savannah.

The inhabitants of the site practiced agriculture since the early first millennium AD, but a notable increased occurred in roughly 1200 AD. This appeared to be accompanied by a decrease in foreign trade goods from the Indian Ocean trade network, particularly glass and ceramics from this network. For much of the period between 700-1000 AD, Chibuene was an important site that linked trade with the southern African interior and the trade networks on the coast. At the end of the first millennium trade networks on the Indian Ocean shifted north, causing a marked decline in the site’s significance in this network. This marked a transition period of the site from a significant Indian Ocean trade site to an agricultural and herding economy for the inhabitants. Chibuene remained an important location for trade on a regional level, but the site declined in population with the inhabitants scattering further into the interior. Anneli Ekblom suggests that the site may have been abandoned at this time and reoccupied two hundred years later. Evidences for this derives from the stark discontinuity of previous ceramic styles associated with southern African agriculturalists and the movement toward styles associated with Manyikeni.

Despite the potential abandonment of Chibuene, the surrounding region saw a dramatic shift to increased agricultural subsistence. At the same time of this shift, it is evident that the site began to become under the influence of Manyikeni, a Zimbabwean stone complex 50 km northwest of the site. Chibuene appeared to have become a tributary and redeveloped under the influence of Manyikeni. The increased use of agriculture likely served as an adaptive strategy to make up for the decreased availability of trade in the region. Furthermore, the climactic composition of the region largely remained the same as the previous occupation with sparse and unreliable rainfall, combined with low nutrient soil, further suggesting a relationship. Domesticated animals such as cattle, sheep, and goats remain in the faunal assemblages, suggesting their continued use as a buffer during periods of lower agricultural production. In addition, marine fauna remained an important part of the diets of individuals occupying the site.

The region surrounding Chibuene through the course of its occupation was a site of dramatic transformations of vegetation cover and climactic shifts. Pollen diagrams deriving from the surrounding lakes of Nhaucati and Xiroche revealed extensive landscape transformations from riverine forests to mostly savannah in the present day. As a result, the individual inhabitants employed a variety of adaptive strategies in order to procure adequate resources for survival. These included agriculture, keeping of domesticated animals, collecting of wild plant food stuff, and making use of their position close to the coast by exploiting marine flora and fauna. The site illustrated nearly 1600 years of such strategies.

== Regional and coastal trade ==
The high concentration of beads in the early occupation levels of the Chibuene site suggest that the site was an important point of entry for trade goods arriving in the interior from 700-1000 AD. Many sites further north have been dated to have participated in trans-oceanic trade in the early first millennium AD, but sites such as Chibuene further south appear to have conducted extensive trade much earlier in the eighth century AD, evidenced from imported glass. Chibuene was the most southern trading port to have participated in the Indian Ocean Trade network. The glass deposits at the site match those of sites in the interior extending 1500 km. In this time frame, Chibuene was a very important gateway linking the coast to the interior, but sometime at the end of the first millennium its role dramatically decreased in the Indian Ocean trade network. Contemporaneously, sites further north, particularly Unguja Ukuu on Zanzibar and Tumbe on Pemba Island experienced a similar decline and trade and period of abandonment.

=== Ceramics ===
The earliest ceramics in the lowest levels of occupation contained a distinct pottery style, most associated with early agriculturalists in southern Africa. Much of the first phase of occupation is dominated by locally produced ceramics, mentioned above, Islamic glazed ware, and Ziwa tradition ceramics. The two notable types of glaze ware includes tin-glazed with a splash painted decoration and a light blue glaze. Contained in the artefact assemblage were two fragments of light blue glaze on a buff body found in the lowest occupation in addition to small sherds of similar type. Another two imported ceramics were two bowls of different sizes, one 22 cm in diameter and the other 28 cm in diameter. These were of the same design of a slightly raised ridge found on the inside body and turned out lips, but of differing size. This bowls were characteristic of ceramics found in Period Ia in Kilwa Kisiwani located to the north in Tanzania. It remains unknown as to whether these were imported from Kilwa or produced locally. These ceramic types were only found in the lower levels of occupation.

The unglazed ware at the site contained motifs ranging from triangles, oblique and horizontal lines, cross hatching, zigzags, and herringbone, typically across the rim, neck, or shoulder of the vessels. These appear to be produced through fine and gross incisions and shell impressions or punctuations. Ceramic evidence in the archaeological assemblage reveals that the site had a degree of contact with sites to the north and south in addition to Indian Ocean traders along the coast.

In the later occupation levels, ceramic levels begin to take on a new character. The assemblages begin resemble ceramic deposits located in Manyikeni at roughly 1200 AD. Ceramic samples taken from the earliest occupation levels at Manyikeni reveal dissimilarity with ceramics of the earliest levels at Chibuene. The most distinct Manyikeni ceramics are ovaloid vessels with shell impressed motifs and independent restricted vessels with graphite decoration which are absent from the assemblages within Chibuene in the first phase of occupation between 600-1000 AD. The discontinuity of imported glazed ceramics and introduction of Manyikeni styles is suggestive of the site becoming under the influence of Manyikeni. The ceramics in this period appear to be completely dominated by shell stamping in a similar manner to Manyikeni.

=== Glass and shell beads ===
The first occupation phase of Chibuene contained a multitude of glass beads, glass fragments, and shell beads. Glass beads classified as Zhizo beads have been found at sites further south and in limited numbers in sites further north. These same beads appear less frequently in the later occupation levels in the second millennium. Furthermore, glass beads appear most frequently in the early occupation sites and show a dramatic decrease in the later occupation levels. These reveal the significance of Chibuene as an important point of entry for glass and glass beads to sites located in the interior of southern Africa and to a lesser degree regions north of the site. Written sources in from the fifteenth century revealed that ivory, animal skins and slaves were traded for glass beads.

In archaeological surveys performed between 1995 and 2001 from the lower levels of occupation (600-1000 AD), 2800 beads were collected from the site with the vast majority being of the Zhizo tradition and the discovery of a new typology, named the Chibuene series. The Zhizo beads were made of plant-ash glass which suggests a Near Eastern origin, as only sites west of the Euphrates utilized plant-ash glass at this time, but the beads were manufactured with South Asian technology, making the place of manufacture difficult to ascertain.

The Chibuene series is distinct from other glass beads in the area in morphology and chemistry. The beads are tubular in shape with ends that have been rounded through reheating and suggested to be older than Zhizo beads at the site. These only match beads located at Nqoma in western Botswana, contemporaneously. The glass used to manufacture the beads appear to have a Near East origin.

Archaeological evidence reveals that Chibuene played an important role in trade in the region, despite the decline of Indian Ocean trade at the end of the first millennium. The site remained important for local trade between the north and south in addition to linking the coast with the interior at Manyikeni in which marine resources have been evidenced in the archaeological record at the site.
