= Roger Summers =

Roger Summers (1907–2003) was a Zimbabwean archaeologist, who worked for the National Museums and Monuments Commission from 1947 - 1970 and was described as "a major influence in the formative years of Zimbabwean, then. Rhodesian, archaeology". He came into conflict with the Rhodesian government due to his refusal to deny the African origins of Great Zimbabwe. He worked extensively on Great Zimbabwe, Nyanga and more generally on the Iron Age in Zimbabwe and on ancient mining in Zimbabwe
