= Ken Mufuka =

Zimbabwean historian

Ken Mufuka is a Zimbabwean historian. He was a pioneer in rewriting the history of Great Zimbabwe, and (as the first African to hold the position of Director of Museums) was commissioned to write a national history of it following Zimbabwe's independence in 1980, publishing in 1983. However disillusionment with Mugabe's socialist regime and their interference in his work caused him to leave for the United States. He is currently a professor at Lander University in South Carolina, in the United States.

== Biography ==
Mufuka says that he was obsessed with history as a child. Having lived 10 miles from Great Zimbabwe, he visited it often, although could only explore it when there were no White tourists around. Mufuka attended Mazoe Secondary School, and was seconded to work with Solomon Mutswairo at the age of 15. He graduated from the University of Rhodesia, and returned to his secondary school to teach history. Children were reportedly fond of his storytelling. He left Mazoe to study for his Master's at St Andrews University in Scotland. Mufuka taught in the West Indies and the United States. He returned to Zimbabwe in the 1980s, and in 1982 he was appointed Director of Museums, the first African to hold the role. He was tasked with rewriting the history of Great Zimbabwe, publishing Dzimbahwe; Life and Politics in the Golden Age 1100–1500 AD in 1983. Peter Garlake criticised Mufuka for saying that the duty of interpretation of Great Zimbabwe's history is Black people's, and White people should only give technical advice. Mufuka became disillusioned with Mugabe's socialist regime after he was pressured to attribute Great Zimbabwe's construction to revolutionaries, and fear of being imprisoned caused him to return to the US. In 1984 Mufuka founded the Ken Mufuka Scholarship, which sponsors Zimbabwean students into Lander University in the US. He also founded the Mufuka Foundation in 1991 which provides funding for various schools in Masvingo Province. He currently lives in South Carolina with his family, and teaches at Lander University. Mufuka has published various books, and writes his popular Letters from America column in the Financial Gazette.

== Selected works ==
His work Dzimbahwe; Life and Politics in the Golden Age 1100–1500 AD (1983) was intended as a riposte to colonial historiography, and supplemented oral sources with archaeological evidence. It has been criticised for the use of creative license in some parts, akin to mythology.

- Dzimbahwe; Life and Politics in the Golden Age 1100–1500 AD (1983)
- Matters of Dignity (1984)
- Matters of Dignity (1992)
- Life and Times of Robert Mugabe, 1982–2017: Dream Betrayed (2018)
