= Bumbusi National Monument =

Zimbabwean archaeological site

- Interactive map of Bumbusi National Monument
- Coordinates: 18.513°S 26.185°E

Bumbusi is a Zimbabwean archaeological site, surrounded by Hwange National Park, in Western Zimbabwe. It is not often visited because of its remote location and low tourist profile. The remains on the site resemble those of other archaeological sites in the Great Zimbabwe tradition. The Bumbusi National Monument consists of colossal stone walls, boulders, platforms and the ruins of dwellings. Its main structures date from the eighteenth and nineteenth century. Excavations in 2000 revealed the floors of eighteen original dwellings. The site was declared a National Monument in 1946. In 2008 it was listed in the World Monuments Watch List of 100 of Most Endangered Sites by the World Monuments Fund because of the threats posed to the sandstone walls by wild animals from the surrounding nature reserve.

== Description ==
=== Geography ===
The Bumbusi National Monument spans across the Sinamatella area and the Robins Camp area, two of the main inhabitable zones within the national park. (Africa Geographic, 2020) The geography of this area is considered semi-arid, with seasonal rain dictating when rivers run and flora recovers. This seasonal rain supports a significant population of both elephants and lions, indicating that in the past these geographical features would have been important to the conditions that allowed communities and clans to construct and inhabit Bumbusi National Monument.

It is likely the site was named after the river that spans approximately 9.6 km through the valley where the monument sits at the crest. The monument was built on an elevated site atop large sandstone outcrops, referred to as kopjes in continental Africa. In the process of levelling the kopjes the sandstone was recycled and used in the construction of the walls.
