= Gokomere =

Coordinates: 19°56′S 30°46′E

Gokomere is a culture in Zimbabwe, known for its rock art and pottery traditions dating from 200 to 650 BC.

Identified through jars with rim shoulder layout, neck bowls with a neck layout, carinated bowls, open bowls, hemispherical bowls, small jars, and angled bowls with body and color layout. Oblique stampings on the thickened rims and multiple bands on the reck are added for decorations.

== History ==
The ancient Bantu people who inhabited the area of Great Zimbabwe around the 4th century AD probably built the complex between 1000 and 1200 AD. The Gokomere traded via ancient trading routes over the Chimanimani Mountains on the current Zimbabwe-Mozambique border with the Swahili civilization on the Kenyan and Tanzanian coast. This group is believed to have given rise to the Shona peoples.

=== History of Research ===
The first finding of Gokomere pottery was found by Father F. Gardner in 1934. The ceramics were found within a tunnel site. Formed by elongated boulder that leaned on each other, the tunnel was 20 yards long, with 3 different classified zones. The first zone, zone c, held beads, copper bangles, and smaller pottery. The second zone, Zone 2, and the third zone, Zone A, held pottery throughout.

The material found within the tunnel site was returned to Rhodesia as an attempt to examine them, but due to war in Rhodesia the research was postponed. In 1961, researchers returned to the tunnel cite to use the pottery to describe the Early Iron Age ceramics.
