= Innocent Pikirayi =

Archaeologist (b. 1963)

- Education: University of Zimbabwe; Uppsala University
- Scientific career
- Workplaces: University of Pretoria
- Thesis: The archaeological identity of the Mutapa State : towards an historical archaeology of northern Zimbabwe (1993)
- Doctoral advisor: Paul Sinclair

Innocent Pikirayi (born 1963) is Professor in Archaeology and Head of the Department of Anthropology and Archaeology at the University of Pretoria. He works on the state and societies in southern Africa. Pikirayi was amongst the first Zimbabweans to train in archaeology after Zimbabwean independence.

== Early life and education ==
Pikirayi was born in 1963 and grew up in Zimuto, Masvingo, Zimbabwe. He studied history at the University of Zimbabwe from 1983. Under the influence of Peter Garlake and Horace Caesar Roger Vella he decided to take up archaeology. In 1988 he began postgraduate study, supervised by Paul Sinclair at Uppsala University.

== Career ==
He completed his doctoral thesis in 1993 at the Department of Archaeology, Uppsala University, which resulted in a monograph on the historical archaeology of Mutapa State. His research focuses on the state societies of the Zimbabwe plateau, African ceramic traditions over the last 2000 years, and the contemporary role of archaeology. Pikirayi was a Visiting Commonwealth Fellow and Scholar at the Pitt Rivers Museum, Oxford University in 2000 where he studied Khami-period material. In Zimbabwe he has worked as a Dean and Senior Lecturer in Archaeology at Midlands State University and as Lecturer and Senior Lecturer at the University of Zimbabwe. In 2009 Uppsala University appointed Pikirayi as Docent in Archaeology.

He works with the National Museums and Monuments of Zimbabwe to establish management plans for World Heritage Sites in Zimbabwe, and mentors indigenous archaeologists in Zimbabwe. His research focuses on the analysis of ceramics to investigate late farming communities in southern Africa. The Zimbabwe Culture (2001) is a key text for the study of 2nd millennium Zimbabwe, combining archaeological, oral and archival evidence.

Pikiraryi is on the executive committee of the Integrated History and future of People on Earth (IHOPE) initiative. He sits on the editorial board of Azania: the Journal of African Archaeological Research, the African Archaeological Review, Antiquity and the Oxford Research Encyclopedia of African History. He is on the advisory committee of the Shanghai Archaeology Forum.

== Activities and honours ==
A co-authored article was awarded the Antiquity prize in 2008 for the best article published that year. In 2014 he was named the University of Pretoria Humanities Researcher of the Year.

== Selected publications ==
- I. Pikirayi 2002. The Zimbabwe culture: origins and decline of southern Zambezian states. Rowman Altamira.
- Chirikure, S. & I. Pikirayi. 2008. Inside and outside the dry stone walls: revisiting the material culture of Great Zimbabwe. Antiquity 82: 1-18.
- Pikirayi, I. 2013. Great Zimbabwe in Historical Archaeology: Reconceptualizing Decline, Abandonment, and Reoccupation of an Ancient Polity, A.D. 1450–1900. Historical Archaeology 47(1): 26–37.
- Pikirayi, I. 2015. The future of archaeology in Africa. Antiquity 89 (345): 531–541.
- Pikirayi, I. 2016. Great Zimbabwe as Power-Scape: How the past locates itself in contemporary southern Africa. In Beardsley, J. (eds). Cultural Landscape Heritage in Sub-Saharan Africa. Washington DC: Dumbarton Oaks/Harvard University Press, 87-115.
- Schmidt, P. and Pikirayi, I. (eds). 2016. Community Archaeology and Heritage in Africa: Decolonizing Practice. London and New York: Routledge.
