= Karl Mauch =

German explorer (1837–1875)

Karl Gottlieb Mauch
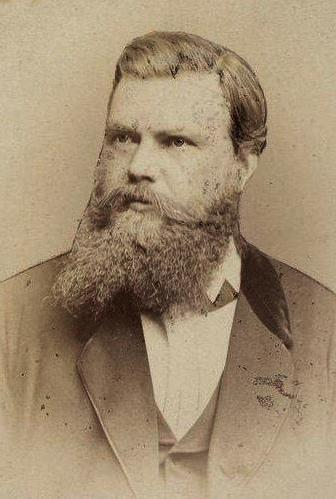
- Born: 7 May 1837; Stetten im Remstal, Württemberg (modern-day Germany)
- Died: 4 April 1875 (aged 37); Stuttgart, German Empire (modern-day Germany)
- Known for: Documenting the Great Zimbabwe ruins
- Scientific career
- Fields: Explorer

Karl Gottlieb Mauch (7 May 1837 – 4 April 1875) was a German explorer and geographer of Africa. He reported on the archaeological ruins of Great Zimbabwe in 1871 during his search for the biblical land of Ophir.

== Exploration and Great Zimbabwe ==
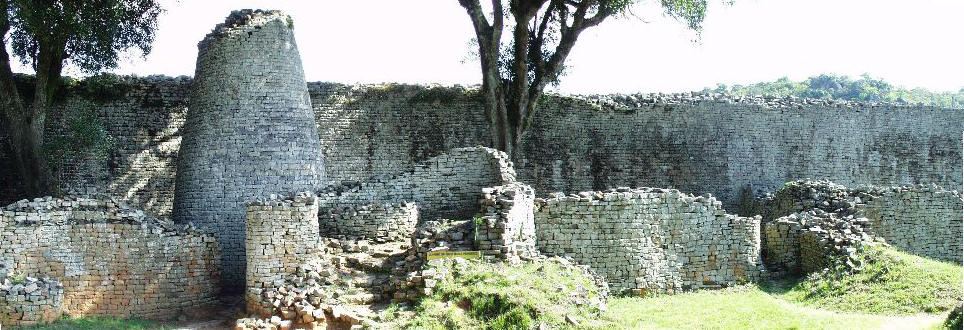
Some of the ruins of Great Zimbabwe as they are presently.

In 1871, Mauch arrived at the stone ruins now known as Great Zimbabwe, five years after discovering the first gold mines in the Transvaal. Mauch believed that the ruins were the remnants of the lost biblical city of Ophir, described as the origin of the gold given by the Queen of Sheba to King Solomon. He did not believe that the structures could have been built by a previous local population similar to those which inhabited the area at the time of his excavation. Further research on the site, including one of the first archaeological uses of aviation, resulted in the conclusion that the structures had indeed been of African origin.

The Great Zimbabwe site is now considered to have been built by ancestors of the Shona people between the 11th and the 15th centuries CE.

Mauch died as a result of a fall from the third floor window of a hotel in which he was living. It is uncertain whether the death was accidental or self-inflicted.

== In media and popular culture ==
"The Real King Solomon's Mines" was the fifth episode of World Media Rights' docudrama series Raiders of the Lost Past, and emphasized the life of Mauch and his quest to discover the fabled mines. The episode was first transmitted in the UK via the Yesterday channel on 23 November 2012, was directed by Gerry Pomeroy, narrated by Jonny Phillips and featured Ross Owen Williams as Karl Mauch. During the week of its first transmission, the Sunday Times Culture Magazine recommended the episode as a selection of the week. In North America, the episode was included as part of the television history series Myth Hunters.

== See also ==
- Eurocentrism
- Africa in Antiquity
- Zimbabwe
