= Manyikeni =

- Ruins of Manyikeni
- 22°11′10.20″S 34°50′41.79″E
- Location: Mozambique

Manyikeni is a Mozambican archaeological site, around 52 km west of the coastal city of Vilankulo. The archaeological site dates from the twelfth to seventeenth century. It is believed to be part of the Great Zimbabwe tradition of architecture, distinguished by mortarless stone walls, and part of the famous Mwenu Mutapa’s Kingdom. The central stone enclosure complex is built in this tradition, and the find of a Zimbabwe-style iron gong at the site also suggests cultural ties.

The site today is covered by the Cenchrus ciliaris grass, commonly found in Zimbabwe but seldom reported in Mozambique. Berger suggests that this may indicate the grass was introduced along with cattle from Zimbabwe. However this grass species is found in all countries along the East coast of Africa (GBIF) and so the low number of records in Mozambique may merely reflect a lack of prior collecting. The site is located 350 km from Great Zimbabwe, the capital of a large, pre-colonial empire active from at least the 11th through the 14th centuries. Barker (1978) has suggested that only the ruling elite at Manyikeni consumed beef, as cattle bones have been found only in the central part of the site. The lower classes who lived at the periphery of the site ate meat from sheep and goats. The presence of a large number of glass beads and seashells at the site have led to speculation that the settlement traded extensively with the medieval coastal settlement of Chibuene.

Manyikeni can be reached from Vilankulo by driving to the EN1 and then travelling south for 30 km. At the small town of Mapinhane, turn right and drive west for 29 km. A small sign shows the entrance to a small track that leads for 3 km before reaching the ruins.

== Overview of the site ==
The site is located on the eastern coastal plains of the Indian Ocean and one of the only Zimbabwean tradition stone enclosures relatively near the coast, emphasizing the site’s role as a coastal trade location. Most importantly, the site appears to have had an important trade relationship with the site located 50 km away, Chibuene, an important Indian Ocean trade network site in the late first millennium AD to the 1700s AD. Occupation of the site begins at about 1200 AD and lasting until 1700 AD. This occupation period is typically broken up into three periods: 1200 AD in which the stone enclosure was being built; 1200-1450 AD in which consists of the height of occupation; and to 1700 AD in which the site was abandoned. The stone enclosure was excavated for the first time in 1975 and 1976, shortly after Mozambique independence by the Eduardo Mondlande University Centre for African Studies and the British Institute in Eastern Africa to 1978. The research in this period determined that the site was a later Iron Age farming community of the Great Zimbabwean tradition, potentially used as a trade outpost with Chibuene.

== Stone enclosure ==
The most distinguishing feature of the site is the stone enclosure reflecting that of the Great Zimbabwe tradition. This enclosure measures 20 meters in diameter with a height of 50 cm, making it much smaller in size than the enclosure of Great Zimbabwe. The stone enclosure was constructed without mortar in a similar fashion to Great Zimbabwe, further emphasizing its association with this tradition. Construction was undertaken with the use of limestone, differing from other Great Zimbabwe associated sites that used granite. This was due to the higher availability of limestone in the surrounding region which follows the pattern of other periphery sites of the Great Zimbabwe tradition that utilized resources from the surrounding region, rather than importation of granite for the construction of the stone enclosures. Great Zimbabwe stone enclosure construction was affected by the given location of the site with the availability of stone determining the size of the stone enclosure of the particular site. Granite was the most malleable construction material used by the Great Zimbabwe tradition, but as for limestone at Manyikeni, this material was much more difficult to shape into building blocks. As a result, the use of limestone was partly responsible for the much smaller size of the stone enclosure at the site.

== World Heritage status ==
This site was added to the UNESCO World Heritage Tentative List on September 15, 1997 in the cultural category.

== Sources and external links ==
- Manyikeni and Chibuene at UNESCO World Heritage Centre
- Symposium
- Directions and Photos at Mozaic Travel
