= Great Zimbabwe =

Ruins of an ancient/medieval city in southeast Zimbabwe

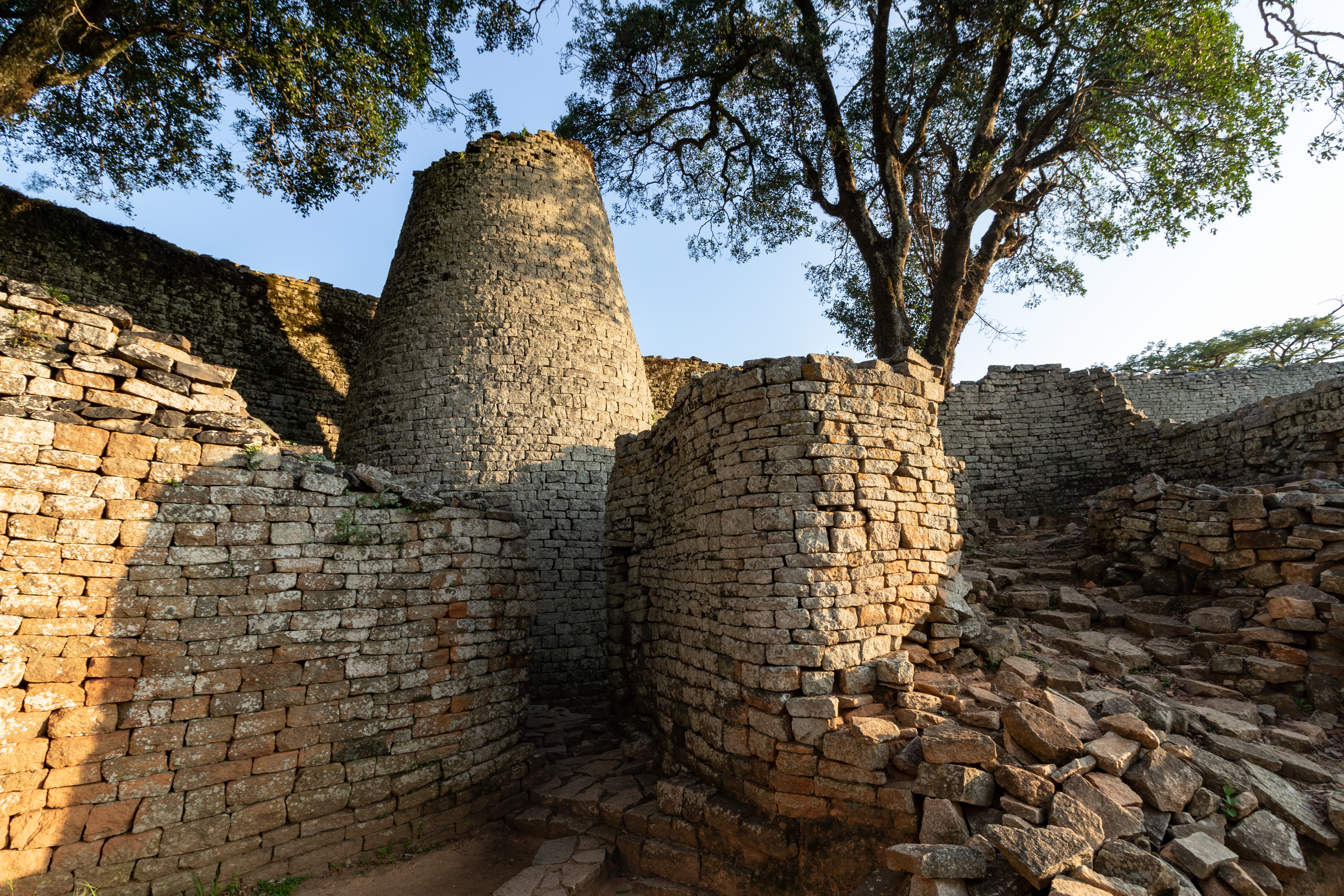
- Tower in the Great Enclosure

- Location within Zimbabwe Location within Africa
- 20°16′S 30°56′E
- Type: Settlement
- Location: Masvingo Province, Zimbabwe
- Part of: Kingdom of Great Zimbabwe

History
- Built: 11th century AD
- Abandoned: 16th or 17th century

Site notes
- Material: Granite
- Area: 7.22 km^{2} (2.79 mi^{2})

UNESCO World Heritage Site
- Official name: Great Zimbabwe National Monument
- Criteria: Cultural: i, iii, vi
- Reference: 364
- Inscription: 1986 (10th Session)

Great Zimbabwe was a city in the south-eastern hills of the modern country of Zimbabwe, near Masvingo. It was settled by ancestral Shona people from around 1000 AD, and served as the capital of the Kingdom of Great Zimbabwe from the 13th century.

Major construction on the city began in the 11th century and continued until the 15th century. The city was abandoned in the 16th or 17th century. The stone city spans an area of 7.22 km^{2} (2.79 mi^{2}). Population estimates vary. Earlier estimates suggested a peak population of around 20,000 people, however a recent study indicated the population did not exceed 10,000. The Zimbabwe state centred on it likely covered 50,000 km² (19,000 sq mi). It is recognised as a World Heritage Site by UNESCO.

The site of Great Zimbabwe is composed of the Hill Complex, the Valley Complex, and the Great Enclosure (constructed at different times). It also contained area for commoner housing within the perimeter walls. Scholars disagree on the functions of the complexes. Some believe them to have been residences for royals and elites at different periods, while others suggest they had separate functions. The Great Enclosure, with its 11 m (36 ft) high dry stone walls (constructed without mortar), was built during the 13th and 14th centuries, and likely served as the royal residence, with demarcated public spaces for rituals.

The history of Great Zimbabwe has largely been reconstructed using archaeological research; although oral traditions about the site survived into the 20th century, no clear corpus of tradition thought to derive from the site's original population survived near it. The word great distinguishes the site from the many smaller ruins, known as zimbabwes, or "houses of stone", spread across the Zimbabwean Plateau. More than 400 such sites have been identified across Southern Africa, such as Bumbusi in Zimbabwe and Manyikeni in Mozambique, with monumental, mortarless walls.

The first confirmed visits by Europeans were in the later 19th century, with investigations of the site starting in 1871. Great Zimbabwe and surrounding sites were looted by European antiquarians between the 1890s and 1920s. Many 20th-century studies of the site were controversial, as the white government of Rhodesia pressured archaeologists to deny its construction by black Africans. Its African origin did not become consensus among scholars until the 1950s. Great Zimbabwe has since been adopted as a national monument by the Zimbabwean government, and the modern independent state was named after it.

== Name ==
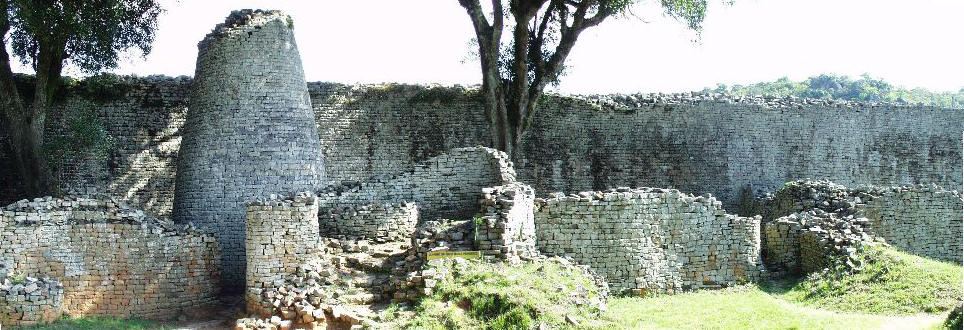
The conical tower inside the Great Enclosure at Great Zimbabwe

Zimbabwe is the Shona name of the ruins, first recorded in 1531 by Vicente Pegado, captain of the Portuguese garrison of Sofala. Pegado noted that "The natives of the country call these edifices Symbaoe, which according to their language signifies 'court'".

The name contains dzimba, the Shona term for 'houses'. There are two theories for the etymology of the name. The first proposes that the word is derived from Dzimba-dze-mabwe, translated from Shona as 'large houses of stone' (dzimba = plural of imba, 'house'; mabwe = plural of ibwe, 'stone'). A second suggests that Zimbabwe is a contracted form of dzimba-hwe, which means 'venerated houses' in the Zezuru dialect of Shona, as usually applied to the houses or graves of chiefs.

== History and description ==
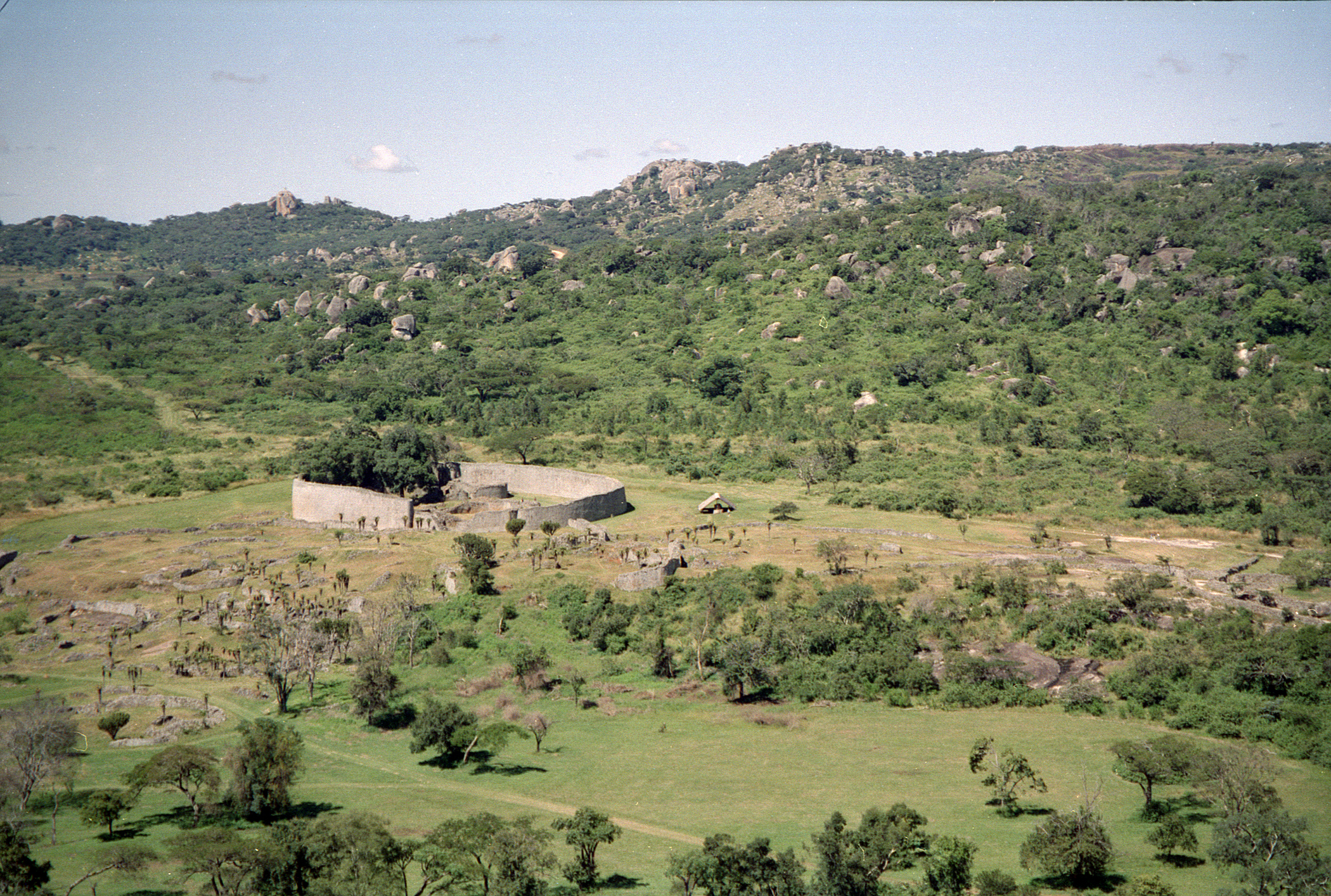
Overview of Great Zimbabwe. The large walled construction is the Great Enclosure. Some remains of the valley complex can be seen in front of it.

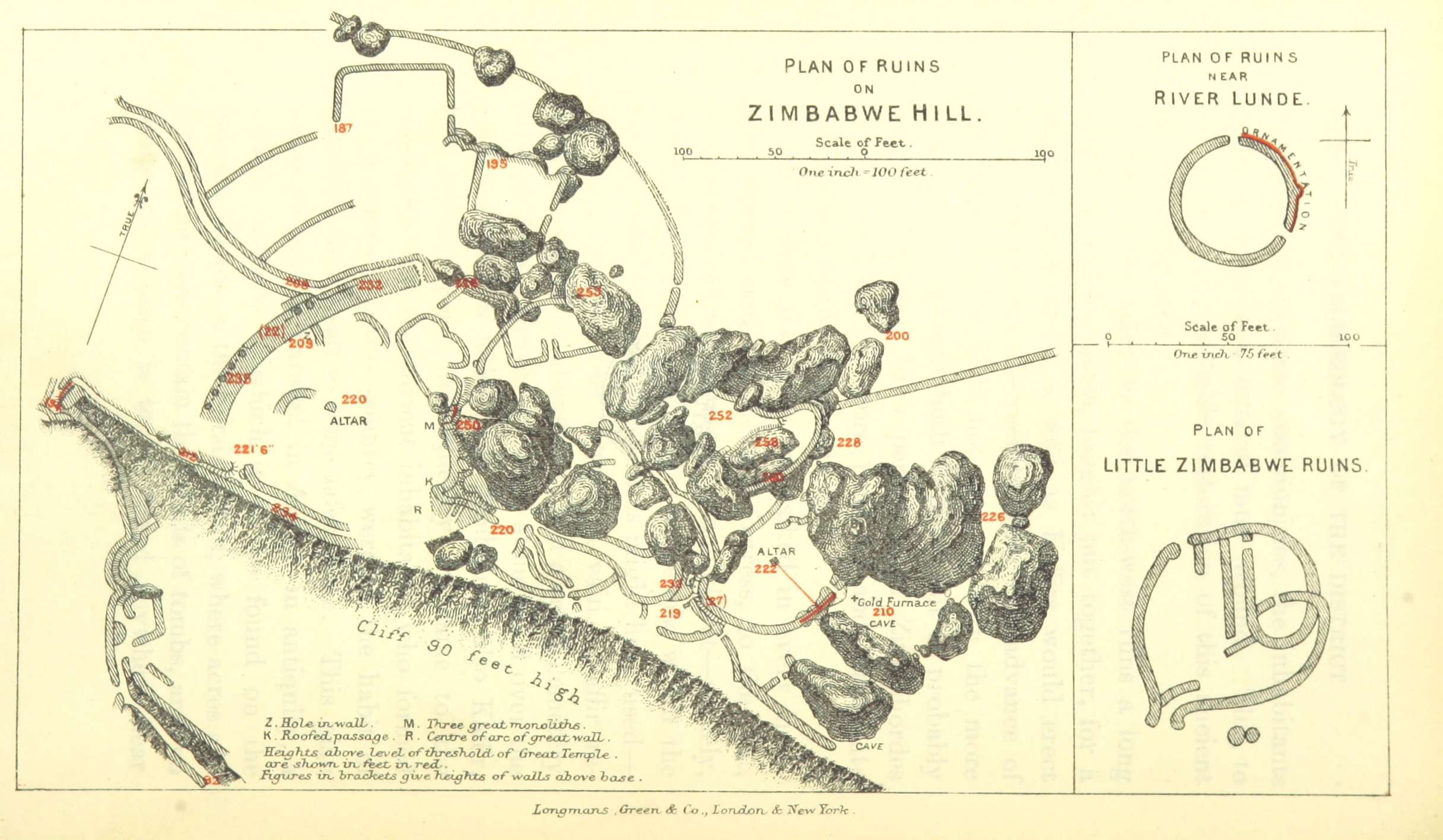
Plan of the complex (first published in 1892)

=== Settlement ===
The Great Zimbabwe area was previously settled by the San, dating back 100,000 years. (Note: Some scholars contest that cultures and identities cannot be considered fixed or invariable, especially over such a long time period.) Starting around 150 BC, Bantu-speaking peoples settled there, forming agricultural chiefdoms from the 4th century AD. Between the 4th and the 7th centuries, communities of the Gokomere or Ziwa cultures farmed the valley, and mined and worked iron, but built no stone structures. These are the earliest Iron Age settlements in the area identified from archaeological diggings.

The later Gumanye people are considered the ancestors of the Karanga (south-central Shona), (Note: The term Karanga began as an exonym of the Shona used by outsiders, however in the modern day it refers to a dialect of Shona in south-central Zimbabwe.) who would construct Great Zimbabwe.

=== Construction and growth ===
Construction of the stone buildings started in the 11th century and continued for over 300 years. Agriculture and cattle were the basis of the people developing a vital social network, and served to "enfranchise management of goods and services distributed as benefits within traditional political and social institutions". Long-distance trade was crucial for the transformation of localised organisations into regional ones. The ruling dynasty used their wealth to have houses built out of thick daga (earthen daub), rather than daga and poles, and built stone walls to shield themselves from public view. The aforementioned process advanced rapidly in the 13th century, and resulted in the construction of large dry-stone walls.

The ruins at Great Zimbabwe are some of the oldest and largest structures located in Southern Africa. Its most formidable edifice, commonly referred to as the Great Enclosure, has walls as high as 11 m (36 ft) extending approximately 250 m (820 ft). Its growth has been linked to the decline of Mapungubwe from around 1300, or the greater availability of gold in the hinterland of Great Zimbabwe. The institutionalisation of Great Zimbabwe's politico-religious ideology served to legitimise the position of the king (mambo), with a link between leaders, their ancestors, and Mwari (God).

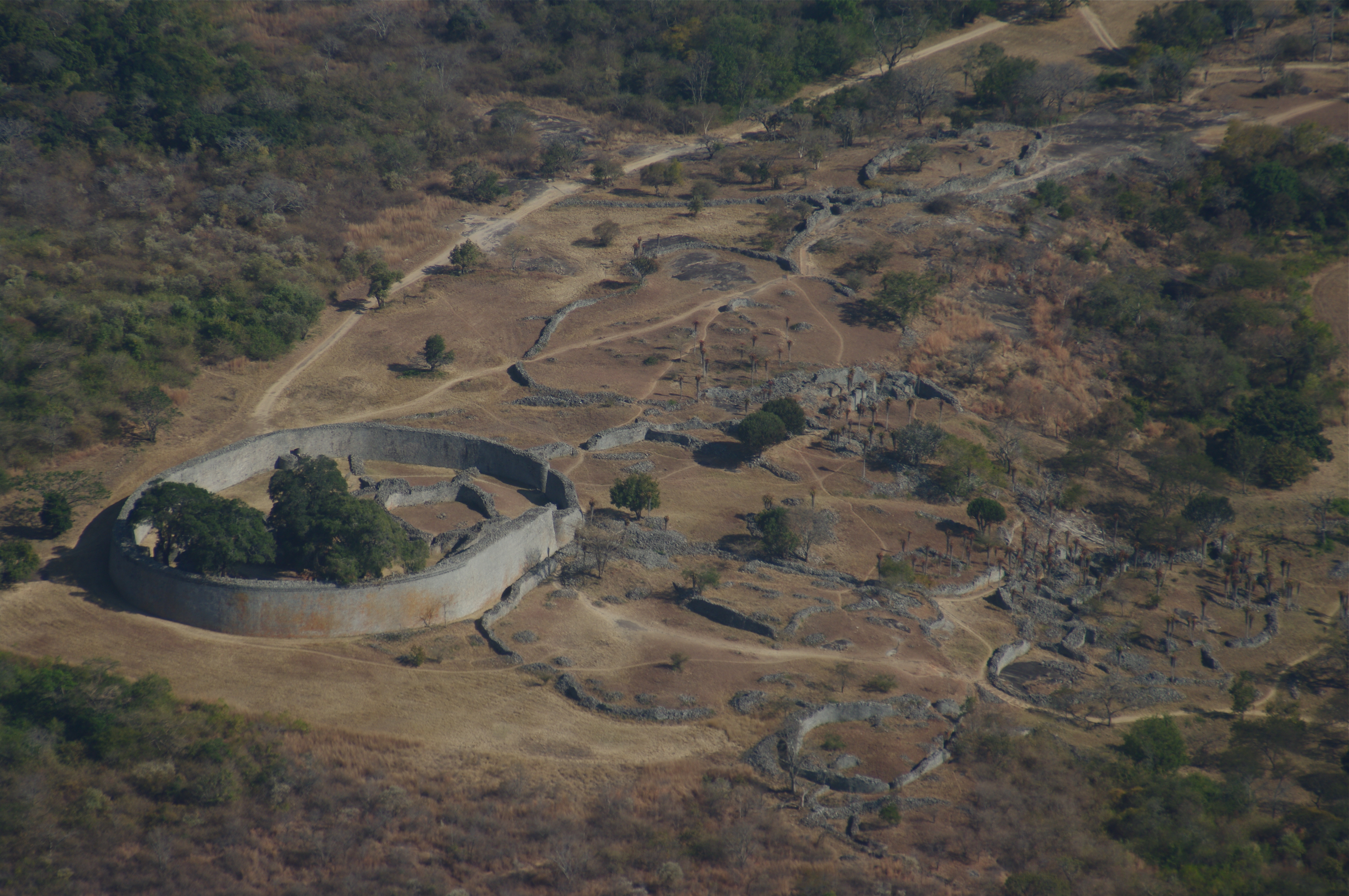
Aerial view of the Great Enclosure and Valley Complex, looking west

Traditional estimates are that Great Zimbabwe had as many as 18,000 inhabitants at its peak. However, a more recent survey concluded that the population likely never exceeded 10,000. The ruins that survive are built entirely of stone; they span 730 ha (1,800 acres). Great Zimbabwe covered a similar area to medieval London; while the density of buildings within the stone enclosures was high, in areas outside them it was much lower. The majority of the population lived in houses made of mud on wooden frame structures; however, the number of these can only be estimated. It is equally assumed that the stone structures were royal or official buildings, and elite dwellings. No burials have been found at the site to give another basis for estimating population.

=== Features of the ruins ===
In 1531, Vicente Pegado, Captain of the Portuguese Garrison of Sofala, described Zimbabwe thus:

Among the gold mines of the inland plains between the Limpopo and Zambezi rivers there is a fortress built of stones of marvelous size, and there appears to be no mortar joining them ... This edifice is almost surrounded by hills, upon which are others resembling it in the fashioning of stone and the absence of mortar, and one of them is a tower more than 12 fathoms [22 m] high. The natives of the country call these edifices Symbaoe, which according to their language signifies court.

— Vicente Pegado

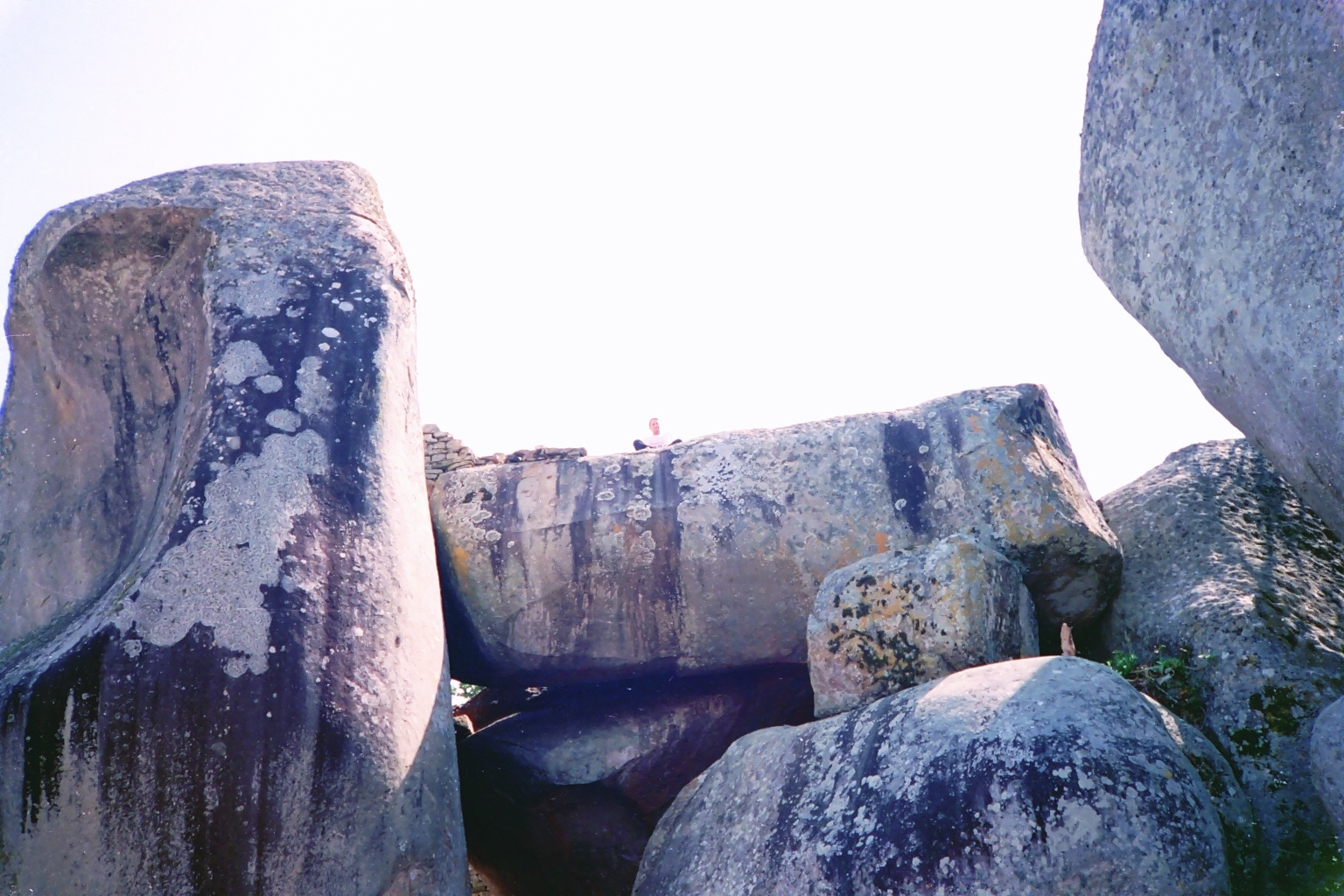
View west from the Eastern Enclosure of the Hill Complex, showing the granite boulder that resembles the Zimbabwe Bird and the balcony.

The ruins form three distinct architectural groups. They are known as the Hill Complex, the Valley Complex and the Great Enclosure. The Hill Complex is the oldest, and was occupied from the 11th to 13th centuries. The Great Enclosure was occupied from the 13th to 15th centuries, and the Valley Complex from the 14th to 16th centuries. Notable features of the Hill Complex include the Eastern Enclosure, in which it is thought the Zimbabwe Birds stood, a high balcony enclosure overlooking the Eastern Enclosure, and a huge boulder in a shape similar to that of the Zimbabwe Bird. The Great Enclosure is composed of an inner wall, encircling a series of structures and a younger outer wall. The Conical Tower, 5.5 m (18 ft) in diameter and 9 m (30 ft) high, was constructed between the two walls. The Valley Complex is divided into the Upper and Lower Valley Ruins, with different periods of occupation.

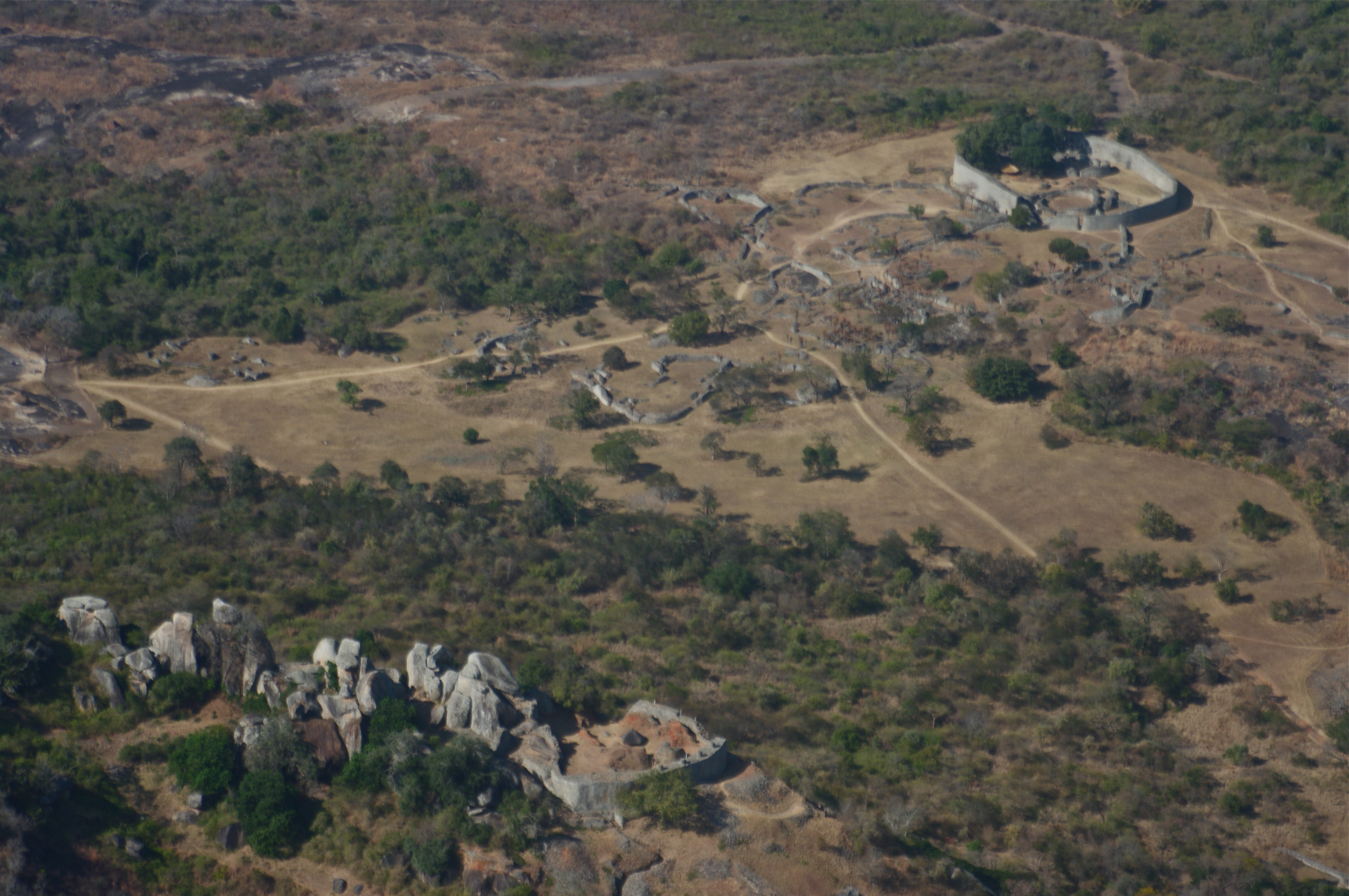
Aerial view looking southeast, Hill Complex in foreground

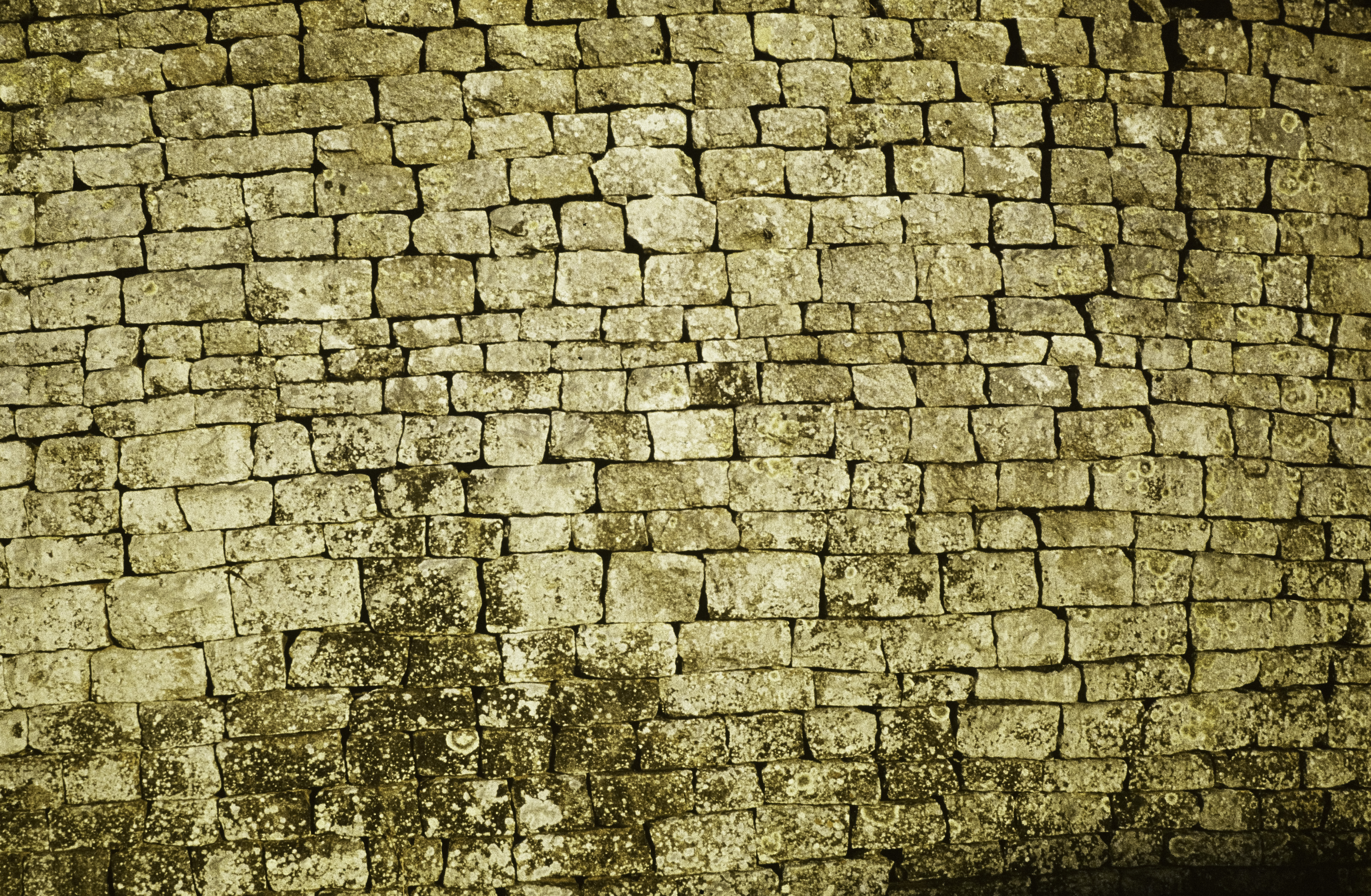
Detail of the wall with lichen, 1975.

There are different archaeological interpretations of these groupings. It has been suggested that the complexes represent the work of successive kings: some of the new rulers founded a new residence. The focus of power moved from the Hill Complex in the 12th century, to the Great Enclosure, the Upper Valley and finally the Lower Valley in the early 16th century. The alternative "structuralist" interpretation holds that the different complexes had different functions: the Hill Complex as an area for rituals, perhaps related to rain making, the Valley complex was for the citizens, and the Great Enclosure was used by the king. Structures that were more elaborate were probably built for the kings, although it has been argued that the dating of finds in the complexes does not support this interpretation.

Dhaka pits were closed depressions used by inhabitants of Great Zimbabwe as sources of water management in the form of reservoirs, wells and springs. Dhaka pits may have been in use since the mid-2nd millennium CE and the system could hold more than 18,000 m^{3} (640,000 cu ft) of water storage.

=== Notable artefacts ===
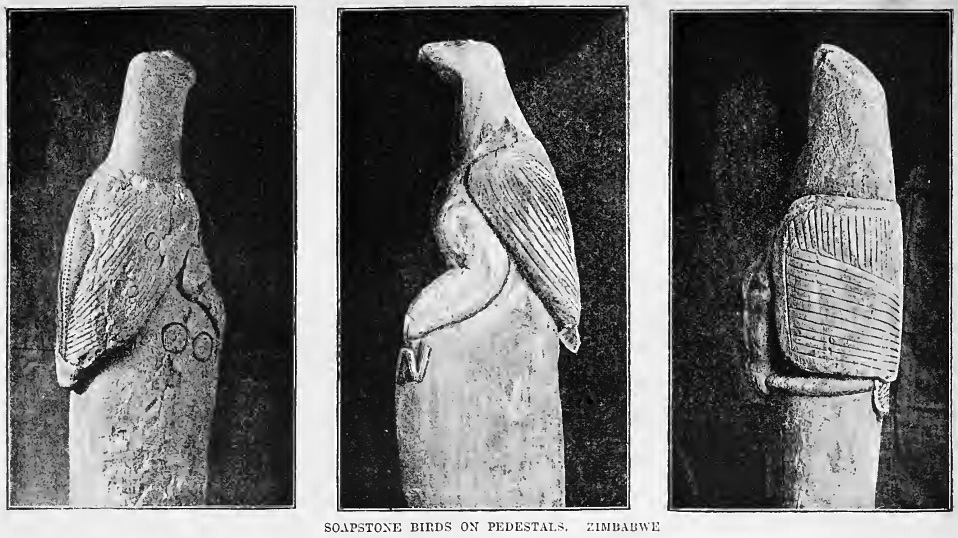
Soapstone Zimbabwe Birds found in the ruins, photographed c. 1891

The most important artefacts recovered from the monument are the eight Zimbabwe Birds. These were carved from a micaceous schist (soapstone) on the tops of monoliths the height of a person. Slots in a platform in the Eastern Enclosure of the Hill Complex appear designed to hold the monoliths with the Zimbabwe birds, but as they were not found in situ, the original location of each monolith and bird within the enclosure cannot be determined. Other artefacts include soapstone figurines (one of which is in the British Museum), pottery, iron gongs, elaborately worked ivory, iron and copper wire, iron hoes, bronze spearheads, copper ingots and crucibles, and gold beads, bracelets, pendants and sheaths. Glass beads and porcelain from China and Persia among other foreign artefacts were also found, attesting the international trade linkages of the kingdom. The extensive, remaining stone ruins of the great city include eight monolithic soapstone birds. It is thought that they represent the bateleur eagle – a good omen, protective spirit and messenger of god in Shona culture.

=== Trade ===
Map of trade centres and routes on the Zimbabwean Plateau

Great Zimbabwe became a centre for trading, having replaced Mapungubwe around 1300. Regional networks were expansive, and salt, cattle, grain, and copper were traded as far north as the Kundelungu Plateau in present-day DR Congo. A significant portion of Great Zimbabwe's wealth came from the domination of trade routes from the goldfields of the Zimbabwean Plateau to the Swahili coast. Traders travelled the Save and Runde rivers, possibly using locally-produced canoes. Through Swahili city-states such as Sofala, they exported gold and ivory into the Indian Ocean trade. The Swahili coastal trading cities acted as intermediaries that linked inland African trade networks with merchants who were operating across the Indian Ocean. That international commerce was in addition to the local agricultural trade, in which cattle were especially important. The large cattle herd that supplied the city moved seasonally and was managed by the court. Chinese pottery shards, coins from Arabia, glass beads and other non-local items have been excavated at Zimbabwe. Archaeological evidence shows that some of the imported ceramics included Longquan green-glazed stoneware and blue-and-white porcelain that dates to the 14th and 15th centuries. These artifacts likely reached Great Zimbabwe through distribution networks that were connected to Swahili coastal ports, like Kilwa Kisiwani. Despite these strong international trade links, there is no evidence to suggest exchange of architectural concepts between Great Zimbabwe and centres such as Kilwa.

=== Gold working ===
Great Zimbabwe was a significant site for gold working in Southern Africa. Archaeological discoveries indicated how gold production was a skill and needed practice rather than a common activity. Recent studies released evidence of debris left behind from gold working, which confirmed that gold was processed in certain areas of the site. This acknowledged that gold working was a meaningful part in craft traditions and its value in economy. The excavations had revealed clay containers, crucibles, and tools which were used to heat gold and turn it into wire, beads, or decorative accessories. Remains of these tools and materials provided an understanding of the skilful artisans who lived in Great Zimbabwe and the major role of gold in their cultural and daily life.

=== Decline ===
It is unknown what caused Great Zimbabwe's demise and its eventual abandonment. (Note: A major factor involves the actions of European antiquarians and prospectors during the colonial period in the looting of the site, destroying its stratigraphy.) It is unclear to what extent climate change played a role; however Great Zimbabwe's location in a favourable rainfall zone makes this unlikely to have been a primary cause. Great Zimbabwe's dominance over the region depended on its continual extension and projection of influence, as its growing population needed more farming land and traders more gold. Shona oral tradition attributes Great Zimbabwe's demise to a salt shortage, which may be a figurative way of speaking of land depletion for agriculturalists or of the depletion of critical resources for the community. It is plausible that the aquifer under Great Zimbabwe ran out of water, or the growing population contaminated the water.

From the early 15th century, international trade began to decline amid a global economic downturn, reducing demand for gold, which adversely affected Great Zimbabwe. Innocent Pikirayi hypothesised that, in response to this, elites possibly expanded regional trading networks, resulting in greater prosperity for other settlements in the region. By the late 15th century, the consequences of this decision would have begun to manifest, as offshoots from Great Zimbabwe's royal family formed new dynasties, possibly as a result of losing succession disputes. According to Korekore oral tradition, Nyatsimba Mutota, a member of Great Zimbabwe's royal family, led part of the population north in search for salt, and founded the Mutapa Empire. (Note: According to tradition, the move came about because the king was tired of eating salt made from goat's dung.) It was believed that only their most recent ancestors would follow them, with older ancestors staying at Great Zimbabwe and providing protection there. Angoche traders opened a new route along the Zambezi via Mutapa and Ingombe Ilede to reach the goldfields west of Great Zimbabwe, precipitating its decline and the rise of Khami, the capital of the Kingdom of Butua. By the 16th century, political and economic power had shifted away from Great Zimbabwe to the north and west. The site likely continued to be inhabited into the 17th century, before it was eventually abandoned.

== History of research and origins of the ruins ==
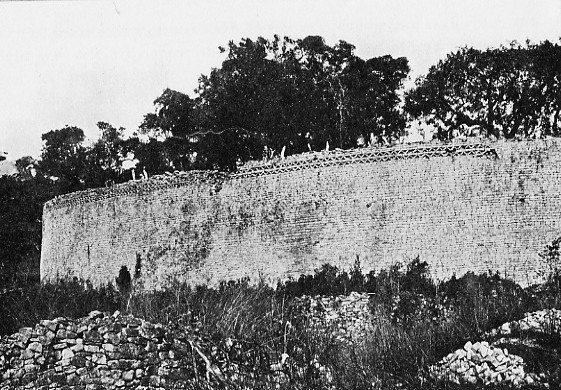
Exterior wall of the Great Enclosure. Picture taken by David Randall-MacIver in 1906.

There has historically been much debate around the origins of Great Zimbabwe, termed the "Zimbabwe controversy". Mired in racial prejudice, Rhodesians found it inconceivable that the structures could have been built by indigenous Africans, stipulating that archaeological discoveries of Persian bowls and Chinese celadon were the result of pre-Bantu settlement. The colonial government pressured archaeologists to deny that the structure was built by indigenous Africans, because acknowledging it would have dismantled their "civilising mission" rationale. The refutation of various fantastical and dehumanising theories ascribing the construction to Jews, Arabs, Phoenicians, and anyone but the Shona, along with other activities of the antiquarians, dominated the historiography of Great Zimbabwe throughout the 20th century. Its African origin only became consensus by the 1950s.

=== Damage to the ruins ===
Damage to the ruins has taken place throughout the last century. European antiquarians looted and pillaged Great Zimbabwe and similar structures from the 1890s to 1920s, greatly inhibiting the work of future archaeologists by destroying its stratigraphy. The removal of gold and artefacts in amateurist diggings by early colonial antiquarians caused widespread damage, notably diggings by Richard Nicklin Hall. More extensive damage was caused by the mining of some of the ruins for gold. Reconstruction attempts since 1980 caused further damage, leading to alienation of the local communities from the site. A continuing source of damage to the ruins has been visitation, with many cases of people climbing the walls, walking over archaeological deposits, and overusing paths, all of which have significantly affected structures at the site. This anthropogenic damage has combined with that from natural causes including erosion, settling of foundations, and damage from plant growth.

== Oral traditions and local perspectives ==
Although Shona oral traditions concerning the construction of Great Zimbabwe continued into the 20th century, none are thought to have survived in the area surrounding it. In the 1980s, Ken Mufuka was tasked by the nascent Zimbabwean government with writing a national history of Great Zimbabwe as a riposte to colonial historiography, for which he utilised oral sources, publishing Dzimbahwe: Life and Politics in the Golden Age 1100–1500 AD in 1983. (Note: Writing in 2005, he said that the shrine in the Hill Complex was the home of spirit mediums (svikiro) who were tasked with acting as the conscience of the state. Accordingly they also preserved the traditions of the founders, who he says were Chigwagu Rusvingo (the first mambo), Chaminuka, Chimurenga, Tovera, and Soro-rezhou among others (see mhondoro).) Mufuka's methodology was strongly criticised by Peter Garlake among others for its purported use of creative license and over-reliance on mythology. In the late-20th century, Thomas Huffman consulted oral sources near the site, Venda and Shona anthropology, and cognitive archaeology in his reconstruction of Great Zimbabwe's history. David Beach criticised his work, and wrote that oral traditions from the original site's population did not survive, largely due to conquests of the entire region by Shona from the north and west in the 18th century, who lacked political incentive to maintain or incorporate them. Several scholars commented in support of Beach's critique, however Innocent Pikirayi tentatively considered it possible that original traditions were "grafted" onto later ones.

Local narratives, despite each clan claiming the site of Great Zimbabwe, are very similar in lamenting both the European antiquarians and the professional archaeologists for desecrating and appropriating a sacred site. They hold the government responsible for the "silence" and "closure" of Great Zimbabwe due to their refusal to "acknowledge the ownership and control of the site by the ancestors and Mwari". For many local communities, Great Zimbabwe is not just seen as an "abandoned" or historical relic, but as a living cultural landscape that is tied to their spiritual and economic livelihoods. However, some researchers note that since archaeologists often have authority due to scientific method usage and claimed objectivity, their perspectives take priority, alienating local perspectives. As a result, the monument is typically treated as a historical archaeological site rather than a cultural landscape that still holds meaning to local communities.

== Political implications ==
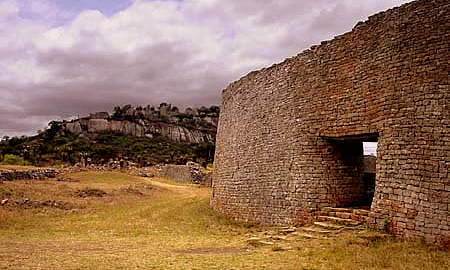
A closeup of Great Zimbabwe ruins, 2006

Martin Hall writes that the history of Iron Age research south of the Zambezi shows the prevalent influence of colonial ideologies, both in the earliest speculations about the nature of the African past and in the adaptations that have been made to contemporary archaeological methodologies. Preben Kaarsholm writes that both colonial and black nationalist groups invoked Great Zimbabwe's past to support their vision of the country's present, through the media of popular history and of fiction. Examples of such popular history include Alexander Wilmot's Monomotapa (Rhodesia) and Ken Mufuka's Dzimbahwe; examples from fiction include Wilbur Smith's The Sunbird and Stanlake Samkange's Year of the Uprising.

When white colonialists like Cecil Rhodes first saw the ruins, they saw them as a sign of the great riches that the area would yield to its new masters. Pikirayi and Kaarsholm suggest that this presentation of Great Zimbabwe was partly intended to encourage settlement and investment in the area. Gertrude Caton-Thompson recognised that the builders were indigenous Africans, but she characterised the site as the "product of an infantile mind" built by a subjugated society. The official line in Rhodesia during the 1960s and 1970s was that the structures were built by non-blacks. Archaeologists who disputed the official statement were censored by the government. According to Paul Sinclair, interviewed for None But Ourselves:

I was the archaeologist stationed at Great Zimbabwe. I was told by the then-director of the Museums and Monuments organisation to be extremely careful about talking to the press about the origins of the [Great] Zimbabwe state. I was told that the museum service was in a difficult situation, that the government was pressurising them to withhold the correct information. Censorship of guidebooks, museum displays, school textbooks, radio programmes, newspapers and films was a daily occurrence. Once a member of the Museum Board of Trustees threatened me with losing my job if I said publicly that blacks had built Zimbabwe. He said it was okay to say the yellow people had built it, but I wasn't allowed to mention radio carbon dates ... It was the first time since Germany in the thirties that archaeology has been so directly censored.

This suppression of archaeology culminated in the departure from the country of prominent archaeologists of Great Zimbabwe, including Peter Garlake, Senior Inspector of Monuments for Rhodesia, and Roger Summers of the National Museum.

The Zimbabwe Bird, depicted on Zimbabwe's flag

The Zimbabwe Bird, depicted on Rhodesia's coat of arms

To black nationalist groups, Great Zimbabwe became an important symbol of achievement by Africans: reclaiming its history was a major aim for those seeking majority rule. In 1980 the new internationally recognised independent country was renamed for the site, and its famous soapstone bird carvings were retained from the Rhodesian flag and Coat of Arms as a national symbol and depicted in the new Zimbabwean flag. After the creation of the modern state of Zimbabwe in 1980, Great Zimbabwe has been employed to mirror and legitimise shifting policies of the ruling regime. At first it was argued that it represented a form of pre-colonial "African socialism" and later the focus shifted to stressing the natural evolution of an accumulation of wealth and power within a ruling elite. An example of the former is Ken Mufuka's booklet, although the work has been heavily criticised. A tower of the Great Zimbabwe is also depicted on the coat of arms of Zimbabwe.

Some of the carvings were taken from Great Zimbabwe around 1890 and sold to Cecil Rhodes, who was intrigued and had copies made which he gave to friends. Most of those carvings have been returned to Zimbabwe, but one remains at Rhodes' old home, Groote Schuur, in Cape Town.

== Great Zimbabwe Hotel ==
In 1902, during the colonial period, the Great Zimbabwe Hotel was constructed in order to provide accommodation for Rhodesians and other Europeans who were visiting the Great Zimbabwe Monuments. The hotel is located within the cultural landscape of Great Zimbabwe and has been the subject of ongoing tension among the hotel's management, the National Museums and Monuments of Zimbabwe (NMMZ), and surrounding local communities. The hotel was initially reserved exclusively for Europeans, excluding Africans from accessing both the hotel and the monuments. Locals were not allowed to move freely through the hotel grounds, with access often being denied based on clothing, attire, or social status. Villagers carrying sacks, wearing shorts (men), sandals, tattered clothes, or traditional regalia for cultural performances were also often turned away.

The relations between the hotel and the monuments were relatively cooperative during the 1980s and 1990s, when both institutions were managed by European staff. During this time, the monument staff was welcomed at the hotel and were sometimes given complimentary access to meals and facilities. However, tensions increased after monument management transitioned to African administrators. There were disputes over access routes, resource use, and developments within the archeological zone, including the construction of campsites and septic tanks without consulting the NMMZ. Buses carrying monument visitors were also redirected to avoid passing through the hotel grounds since passengers "made a lot of noise" or would sing upon arrival due to excitement.

== Great Zimbabwe University ==
In the early 21st century, the government of Zimbabwe endorsed the creation of a university in the vicinity of the ruins. This university is an arts and culture based university which draws from the rich history of the monuments. The university main site is near the monuments with other campuses in the City centre and Mashava. The campuses include Herbet Chitepo Law School, Robert Mugabe School of Education, Gary Magadzire School of Agriculture and Natural Science, Simon Muzenda School of Arts, and Munhumutapa School of Commerce.

== Gallery ==
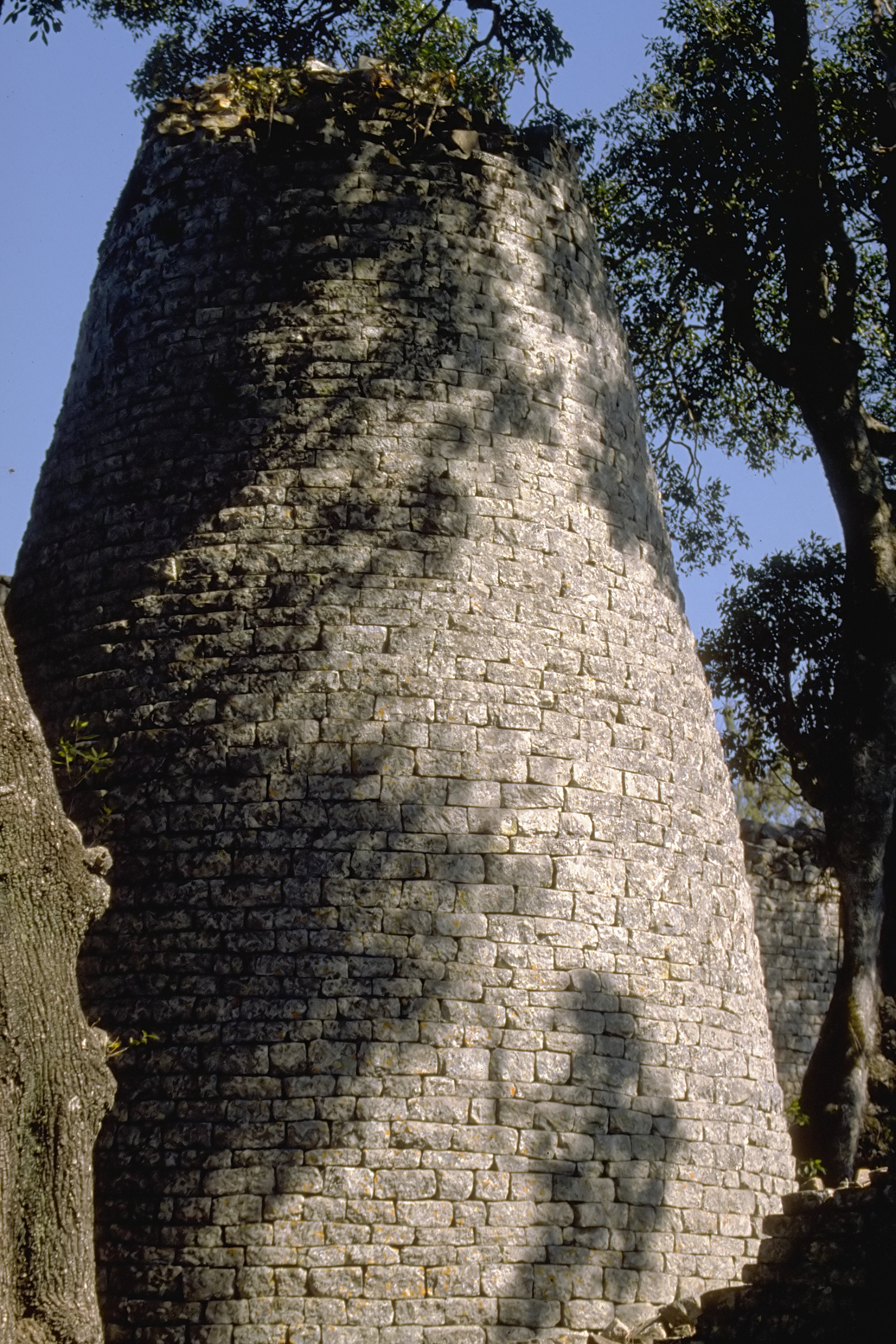
The Conical Tower

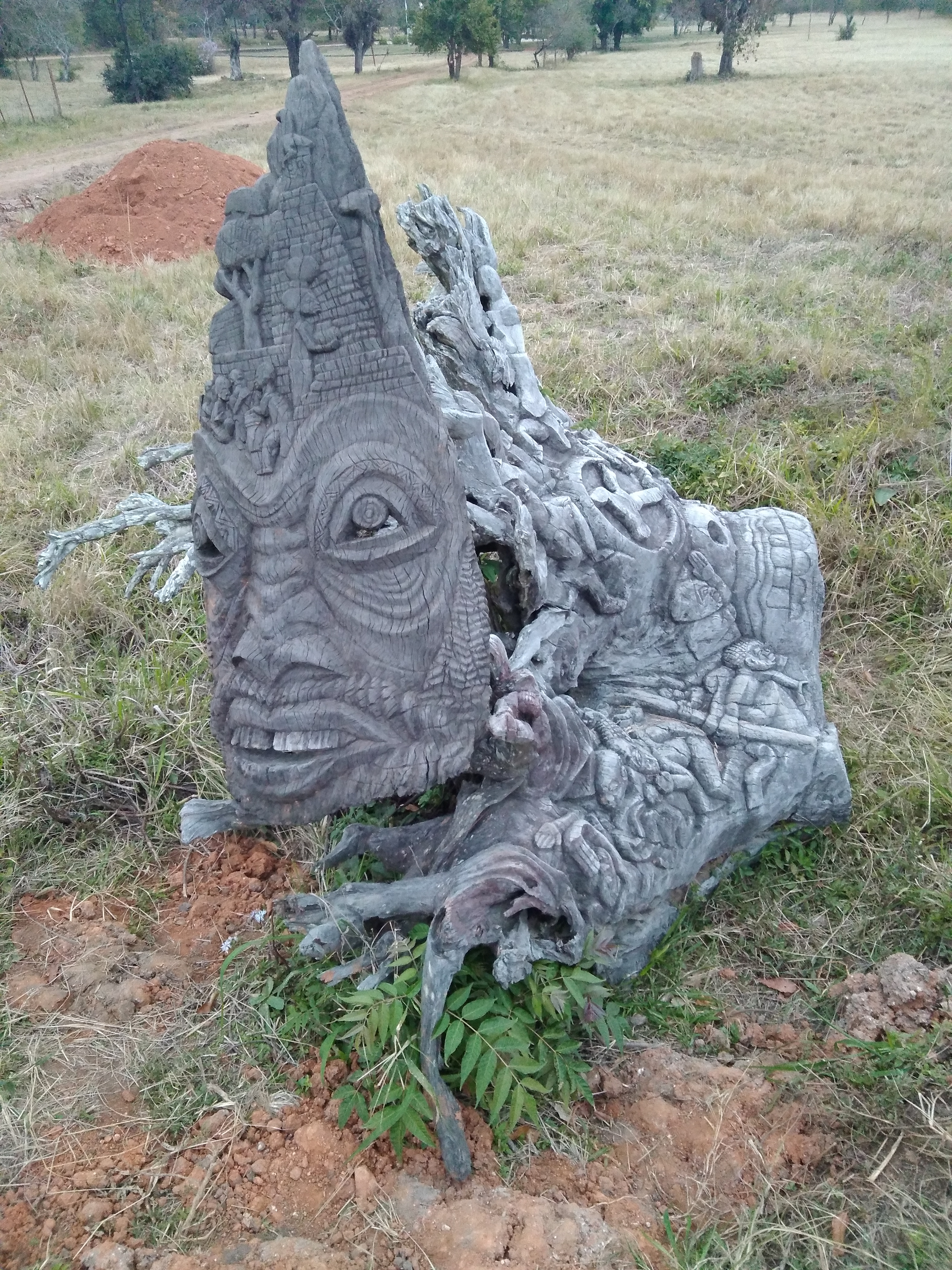
Modern wood carving at the entrance of the Great Zimbabwe

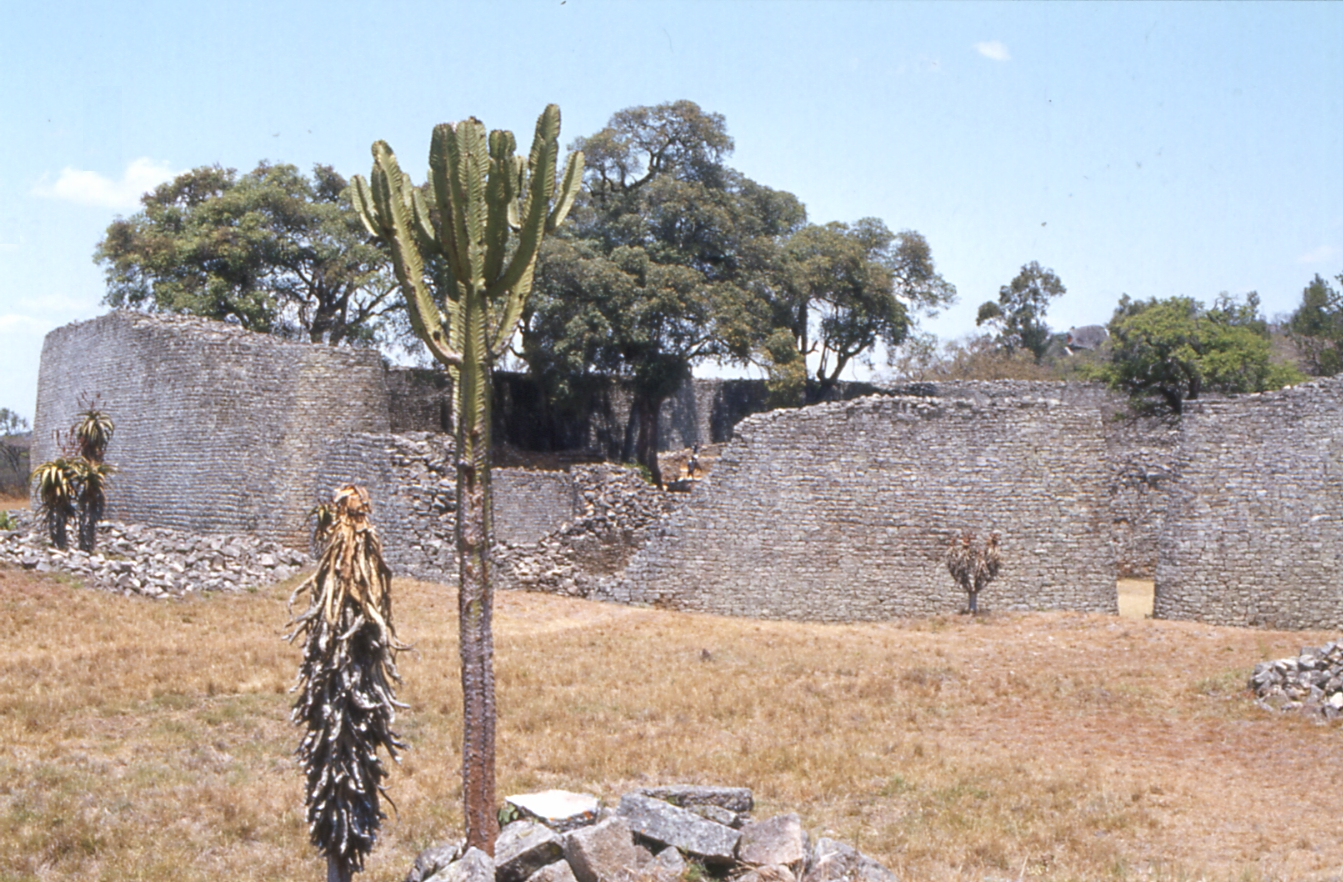
The Great Enclosure

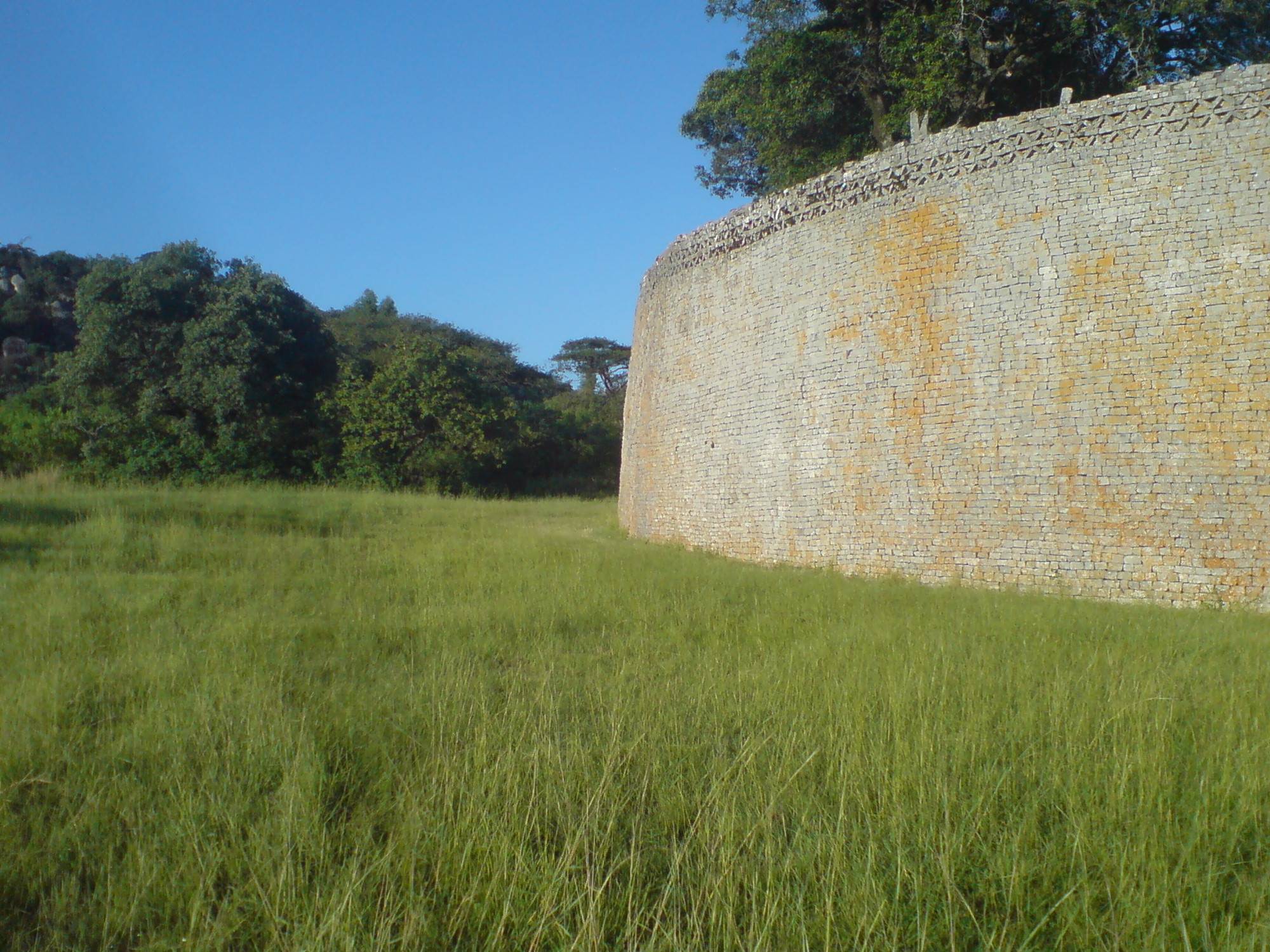
The Great Enclosure (close)

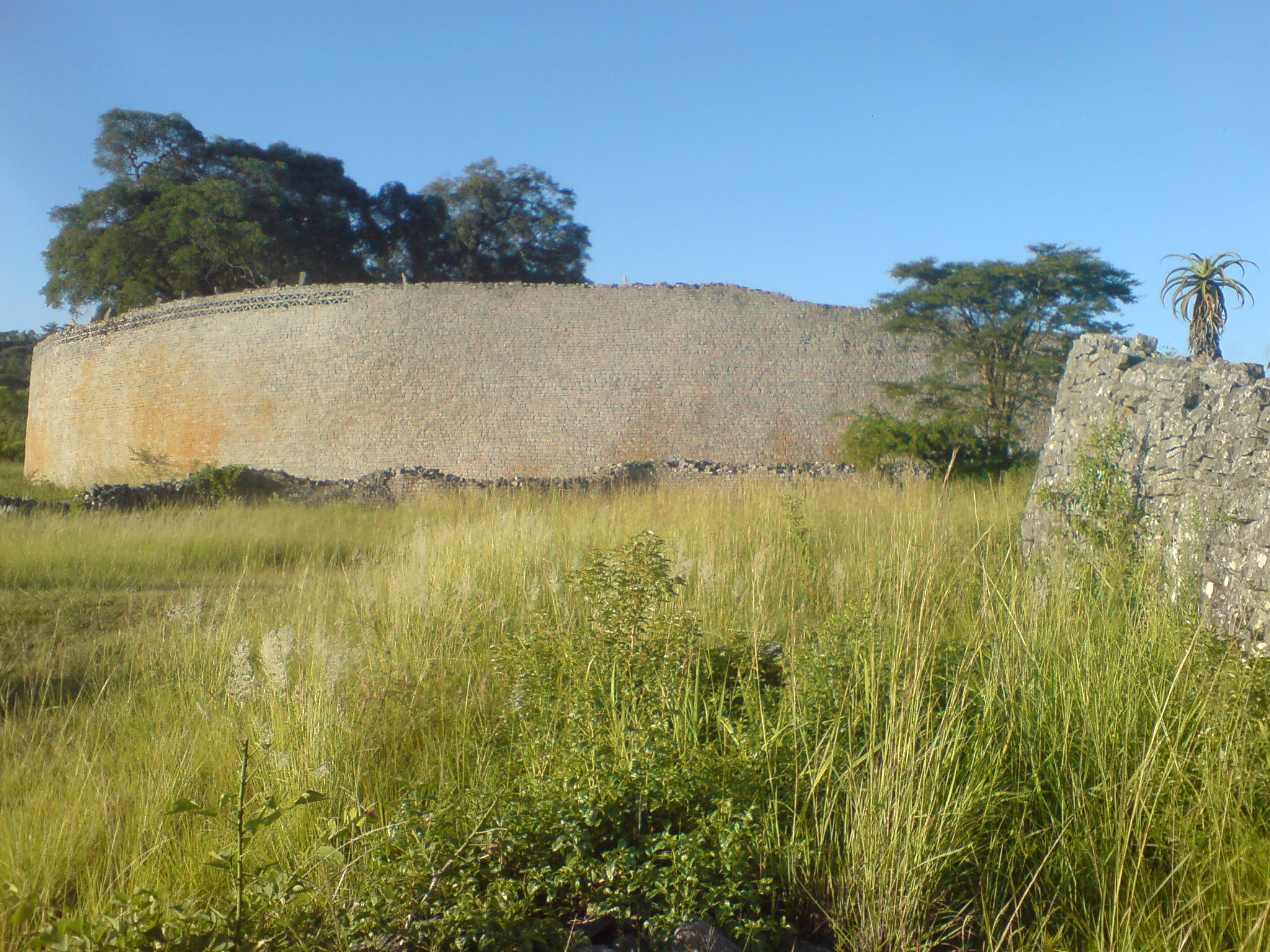
The Great Enclosure (far)

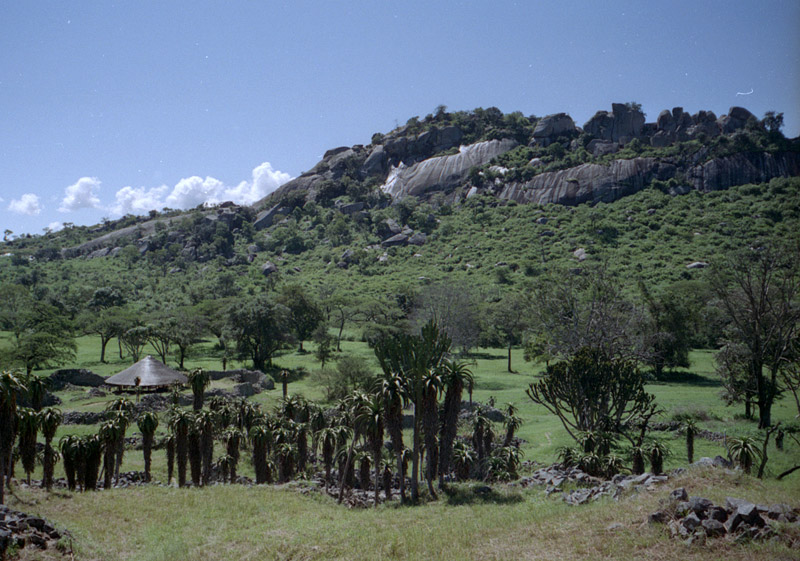
The Hill Complex from the Valley

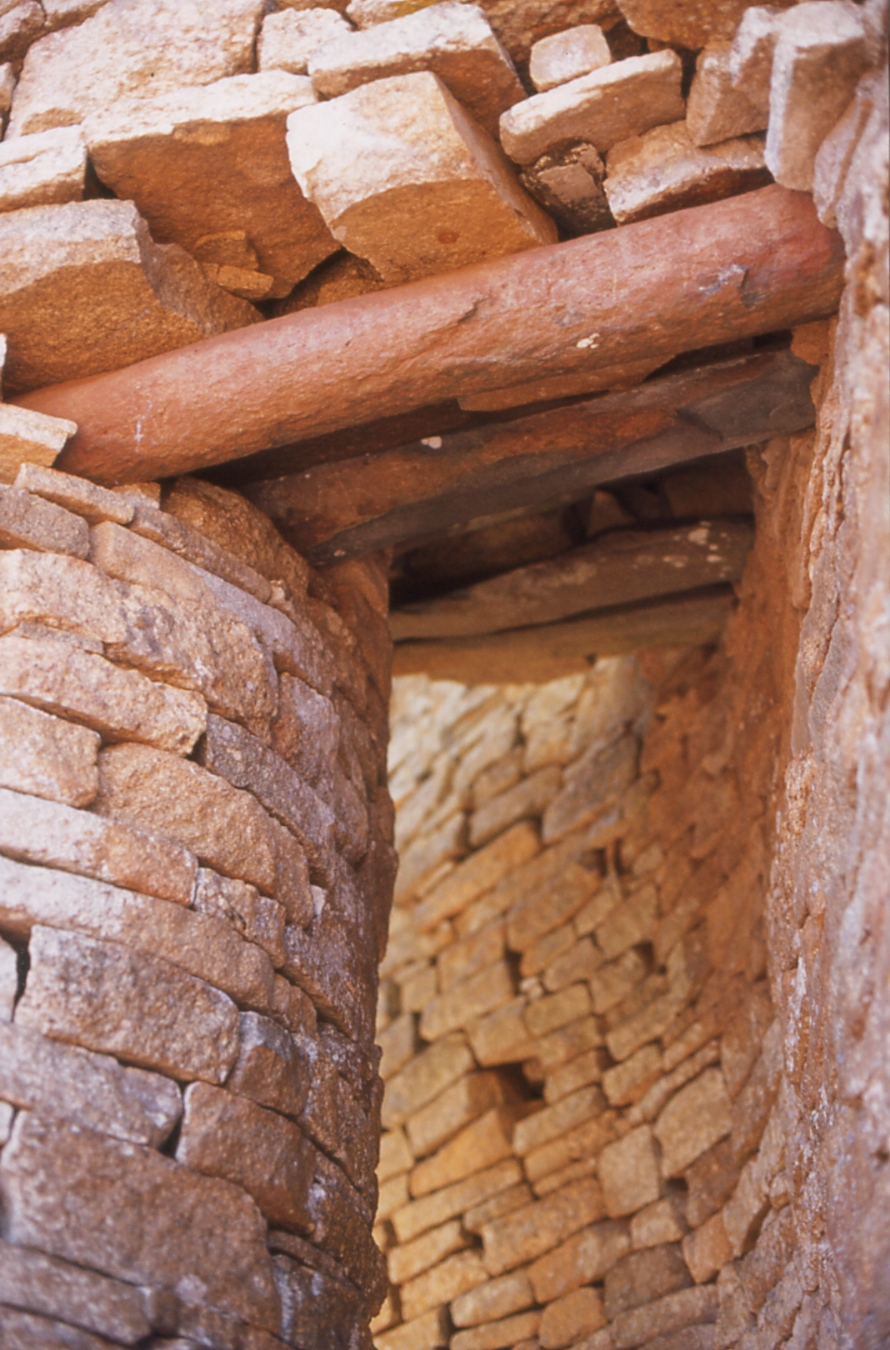
Wooden lintel in doorway

== See also ==
- Other ruins in Zimbabwe
  - Bumbusi
  - Danangombe
  - Naletale
  - Khami
  - Ziwa
  - Leopard's Kopje
  - Mapela, Zimbabwe
- Related ruins outside Zimbabwe
  - Manyikeni – a Mozambiquean archaeological site believed to be part of the Great Zimbabwe tradition of architecture
- Similar ruins outside Zimbabwe
  - Blaauboschkraal stone ruins in Mpumalanga, South Africa
  - Machadodorp baKoni Ruins in Mpumalanga, South Africa
  - Engaruka in Arusha Region, Tanzania
  - Kweneng' Ruins in Gauteng, South Africa
  - Mapungubwe in Limpopo, South Africa
  - Thimlich Ohinga stone ruins in Migori County, Kenya
- Megaliths
- Interregional caravan trade in East Africa

== Sources ==
- Garlake, Peter (1973). Great Zimbabwe: New Aspects of Archaeology. London: Thames & Hudson. ISBN 978-0-8128-1599-3.
- Garlake, Peter (1982). Great Zimbabwe. Harare: Zimbabwe Publishing House. ISBN 978-0-949932-18-1.
- Garlake, Peter (2002). Early Art and Architecture of Africa. Oxford: Oxford University Press. ISBN 0-19-284261-7.
- Matenga, Edward (2008). Soapstone Birds of Great Zimbabwe: Symbols of a Nation. Harare: African Publishing Group. ISBN 978-1-77901-135-0.
- Pikirayi, Innocent (2001). The Zimbabwe culture: origins and decline of southern Zambezian states. Rowman Altamira. ISBN 978-0-7591-0091-6.
- Summers, Roger (1970). "The Rhodesian Iron Age". In J.D. Fage; Roland Oliver (eds.). Papers in African Prehistory. Cambridge: Cambridge University Press. ISBN 978-0-521-09566-2.
- Ucko, Peter J. (1995). Theory in Archaeology: A World Perspective. Routledge. ISBN 978-0-203-97328-8.
