= Peter Garlake =

Zimbabwean archaeologist and historian (1934–2011)

- Born: 11 January 1934; Cape Town, Cape Province, Union of South Africa
- Died: 2 December 2011 (aged 77); London, England
- Spouse: Margaret Garlake
- Scientific career
- Fields: Archaeology; Art history

Peter Storr Garlake (11 January 1934 – 2 December 2011) was a South African-born Zimbabwean archaeologist and art historian, who made influential contributions to the study of Great Zimbabwe and Ife, Nigeria.

== Life ==
Peter Garlake was born in Cape Town in 1934. His father Dooley Garlake was an Major-General and the Commander of the Rhodesian Security Forces in the Federation of Rhodesia and Nyasaland. Peters mother Catherine was a South African of Scottish ancestary.

Garlake began his career in African art and archaeology as a Nuffield Research Student, British Institute in Eastern Africa from 1962 to 1964, carrying out excavations at Manekweni in Mozambique.

From 1964 to 1970, Garlake served as the Rhodesian Inspector of Monuments and was on faculty at the University of Rhodesia. During this time his research focused on the early history of Great Zimbabwe. He argued that Great Zimbabwe was constructed by the ancestors of the current inhabitants of the area, the Shona people, as opposed to being constructed by a non-African or outsider civilization. This research was opposed by the Rhodesian government, including the prime minister, Ian Smith, and Garlake was forced to leave the country in 1970.

Garlake relocated to Ife, Nigeria, and between 1971 and 1973, he was a senior research fellow at the University of Ife, where he researched the early art and archaeology of Ile-Ife. From 1976 to 1981, Garlake held an appointment as lecturer in the Department of Anthropology at University College London. Following Zimbabwean Independence, Garlake returned to Zimbabwe and spent the next ten years conducting his research on early Zimbabwean rock art.

Garlake was married to the British art historian Margaret Garlake.

== Works ==
- The Early Islamic Architecture of the East African Coast (1966)
- Great Zimbabwe (1973)
- The Kingdoms of Africa (1978)
- The Hunter's Vision (1995)
- Early Art and Architecture of Africa (2002)
