= Perth Zoo =

Zoo in Perth, Western Australia

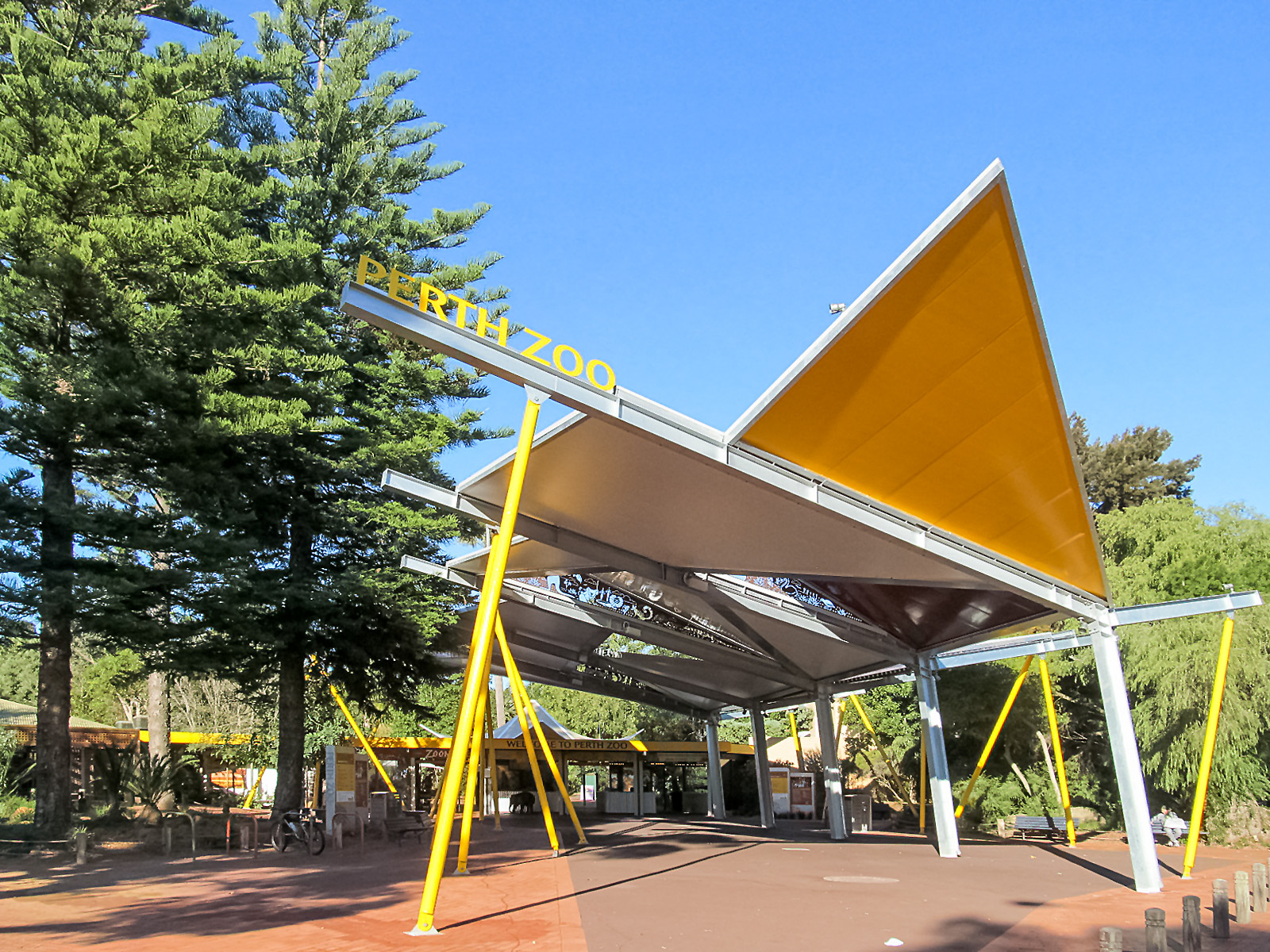
- Perth Zoo entrance in June 2013
- Interactive map of Perth Zoo
- 31°58′32″S 115°51′08″E
- Date opened: 1898; 128 years ago
- Location: Perth, Western Australia
- Land area: 17 ha (41 acres)
- No. of animals: 1258
- No. of species: 160+
- Annual visitors: 717,623 (2018-2019)
- Memberships: ZAA, WAZA
- Website: perthzoo.wa.gov.au

Perth Zoo is a 17-hectare (41-acre) zoological park in South Perth, Western Australia. The zoo first opened in 1898, and by 2011 housed 1258 animals of 164 species and an extensive botanical collection. It is a full institutional member of the Zoo and Aquarium Association (ZAA) and the World Association of Zoos and Aquariums (WAZA).

== History ==
The Perth Zoological Gardens (as Perth Zoo was originally called) were opened on 17 October 1898 by Gerard Smith, the Governor of Western Australia. Planning for the zoo had started in 1896 when the Acclimatisation Society first met, the original purpose of which was to introduce European animals to Australia and establish a zoo for conservation purposes. In 1897 this group invited the director of the Melbourne Zoo, Albert Le Souef, to choose a site. His son Ernest was chosen as the first director of the Perth Zoo, and work began in 1897.

The first exhibits built included two bear caves, a monkey house, a mammal house and a model castle for guinea pigs. The first animals on display included an orangutan, two monkeys, four ostriches, a pair of lions, and a tiger. At first there were only six staff members. The zoo had 53,000 visitors in its first nine months, and had not been closed for a single day since it was opened until it was temporarily closed from 24 March 2020 during the coronavirus outbreak.

From the start, Ernest Le Souef worked to create a botanical collection as well as an animal collection to preserve for the future. Work on the gardens started as soon as the site was chosen and finalised. Since the site was mostly sand and lacked nutrients and water, much manure needed to be brought in, and a well was bored in 1898 to allow irrigation. The zoo included rose gardens, lupin fields, tropical plants, and palms. The original palm collection still stands and boasts over 61 species including Canary Island date palms that are now over 110 years old. The zoo also grew crops for animals including lettuce, alfalfa, carrots, lucerne and onions. This tradition is still alive, with the zoo producing fodder including hibiscus, bamboo, Fijian fire plant and mirror plant.

In 1909, the zoo hosted the Australasian Championships in tennis, the precursor to the modern Australian Open. The Zoological Gardens Courts, now Perth Zoo's main lawn, were considered the state's best tennis facilities at the time.

In 2010/11, the zoo had a paid staff of about 248 (167 full-time equivalents), and about 300 volunteer docents.

Until her death in July 2022 aged 65, Tricia, a female Asian elephant, was one of the most famous animal residents at Perth Zoo, having lived at the zoo for 59 years since 1963. After living nearly twenty years on her own, she was joined by three rescued orphan three-year-old Asian elephants from Malaysia in December 1992 (of which male Putra Mas still resides at the zoo, until June 2025). Tricia was euthanised by zoo veterinarians due to ongoing age-related health issues. After a cremation, her ashes were placed under a forty-year-old 15-metre-tall (49 ft) jacaranda tree on the zoo's main lawn, a memory plaque to be unveiled in her memory. Additionally, a conservation guard hut in Sumatra was named in her honour. In January 2025, Perth Zoo sent their remaining female Asian Elephant Permai to Monarto Safari Park, who would be joined at the facility by the zoo's male elephant, Putra Mas, that November, which ended the zoo's housing of elephants after 125 years.

Additionally, the zoo has had several other noteworthy individual animals in both record longevity and significant contribution to global endangered species captive breeding programs. Puan, a female Sumatran orangutan born in 1956, was gifted to the zoo by Ismail of Johor in 1968 along with three other orangutans. She had 11 offspring, and at the time of her death in 2018 aged 62 (a world record for her species) had 54 living descendants in various zoos around the world and even some released into the wild. Northern white-cheeked gibbon Phillip lived at Perth Zoo from September 1974 to July 2023 and is the record holder of longevity for the males of his species, and had fathered many offspring who in turn have been significant members of the global captive breeding program for the critically endangered species.

=== Governance ===
The head managers of Perth Zoo have from its opening to the present been:

- 1897–1935: E.A. Le Souef – as director
- 1932–1941: L.E. Shapcott – as president of the Zoological Gardens Board
- 1950–1967: W.K. Lyall – as superintendent of the zoo
- 1967–1984: Tom Spence – as zoo director
- 1984–1994: John De Jose – as zoo director
- 1995–1998: Ricky Burges – as zoo CEO
- 1999–2003: Brian Easton – as zoo CEO
- 2004–2017: Susan Hunt – as zoo CEO
- 2017–2018: Maria Finnigan – as zoo acting CEO
- 2018–present: Wendy Attenborough – as zoo CEO

The Zoological Parks Authority has been known as:

- 1896–1967?: Western Australian Acclimatization Committee
- 1967–2002: Zoological Gardens Board

== Exhibits ==
Perth Zoo's largest three precincts are the African Savannah, the Asian Rainforest and the Australian Bushwalk, with other precincts including the Australian Wetlands, Nocturnal House, Penguin Plunge, Primate Trail, Reptile Encounter and the zoo's Main Lake. All the exhibits are designed to mimic the animals' natural habitats and utilise passive barriers where possible, to improve the well-being of the animals.

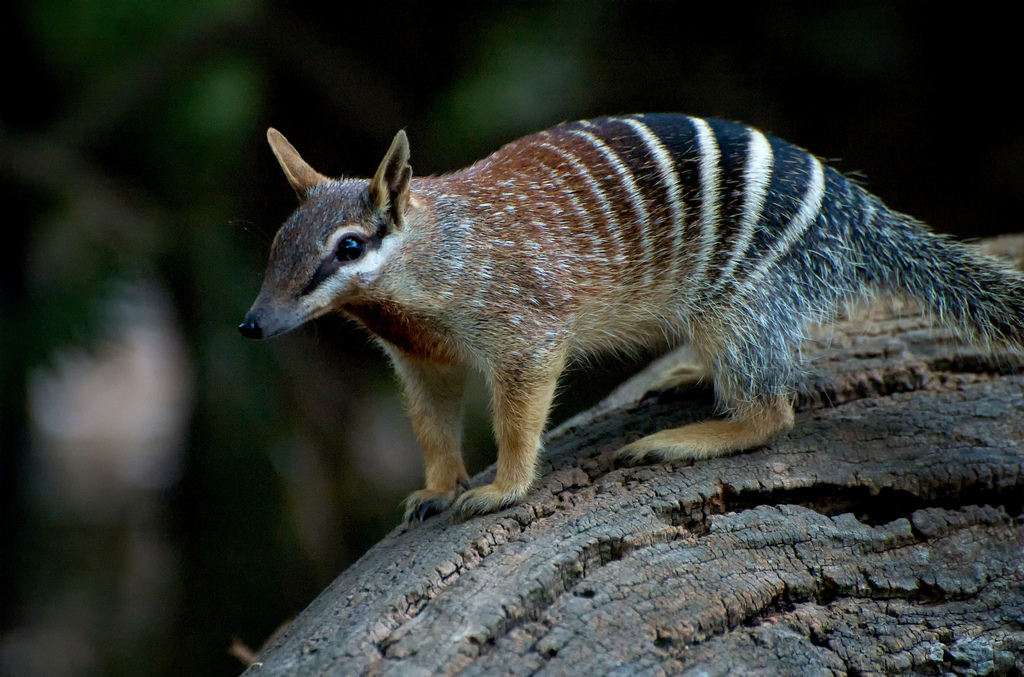
Numbat at the zoo, an ocal vulnerable species and one of a hundred that the zoo bred for captive rewilding efforts

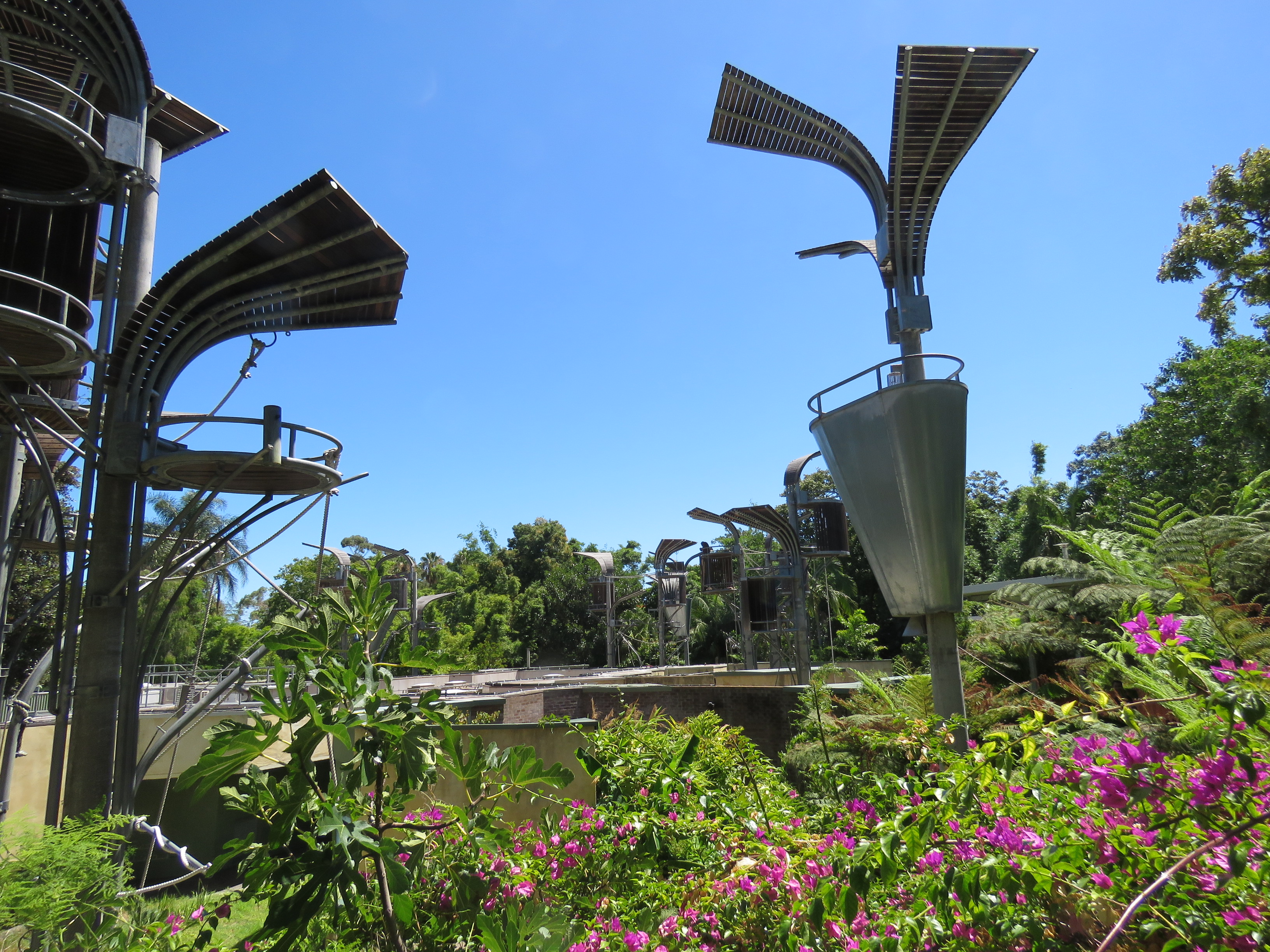
Panoramic view of some of the zoo's Sumatran orangutan's climbing towers

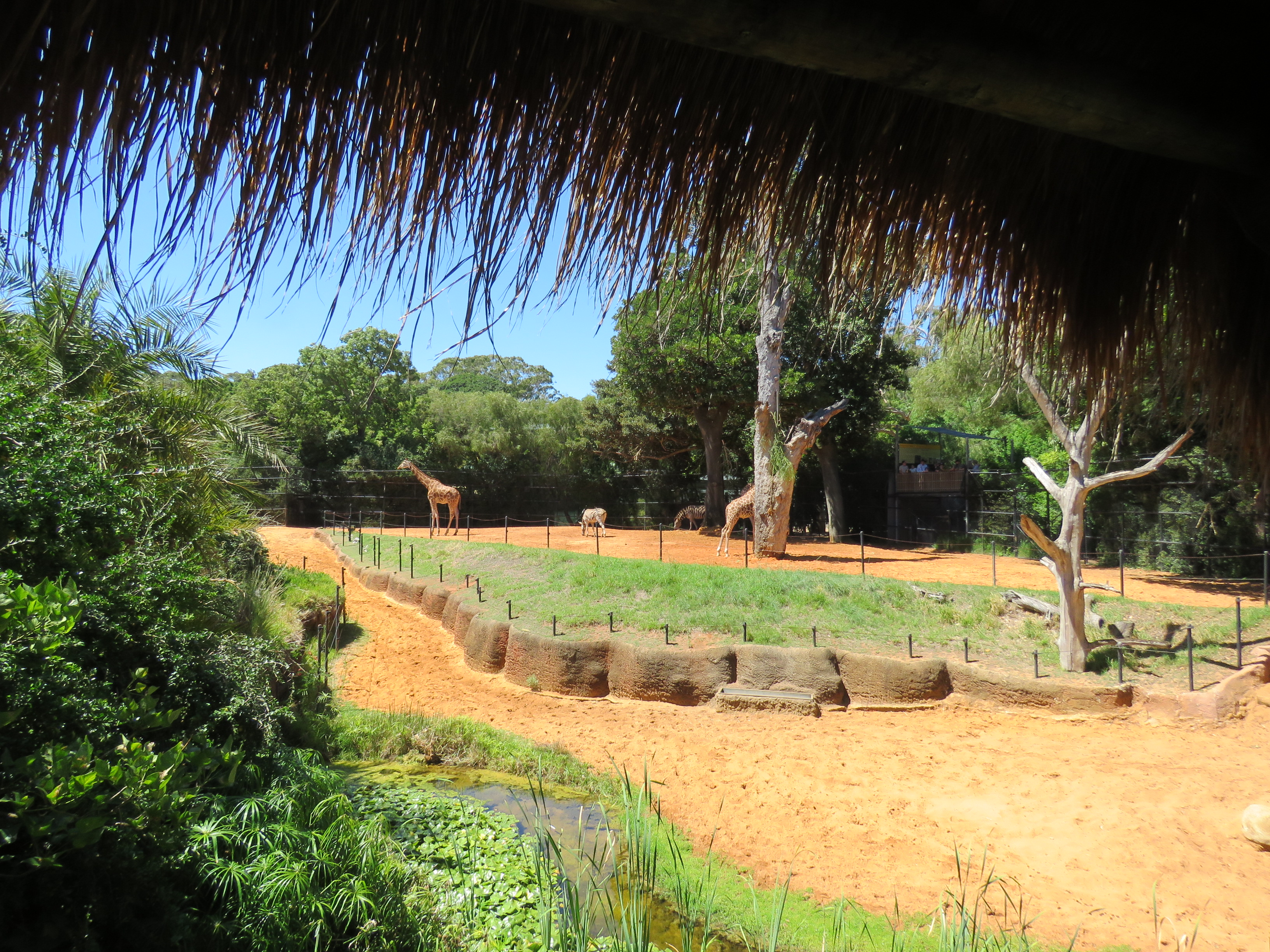
Plains zebra and Rothschild's giraffe in their shared exhibit seen from viewing hut

=== African Savannah ===
The African Savannah opened in November 1991 and replaced a variety of barred cages, as well as an old public oval at the zoo. It was the largest construction project undertaken at the zoo when it was created, and the exhibit recreates the African savannah. Visitors view the animals from a path that simulates a dry riverbed running through the savannah. The resident animals are:

- African lion
- African painted dog
- Cape porcupine
- Meerkat
- Plains zebra
- Radiated tortoise
- Ring-tailed lemur
- Rothschild's giraffe
- Southern white rhinoceros
- Spotted hyena
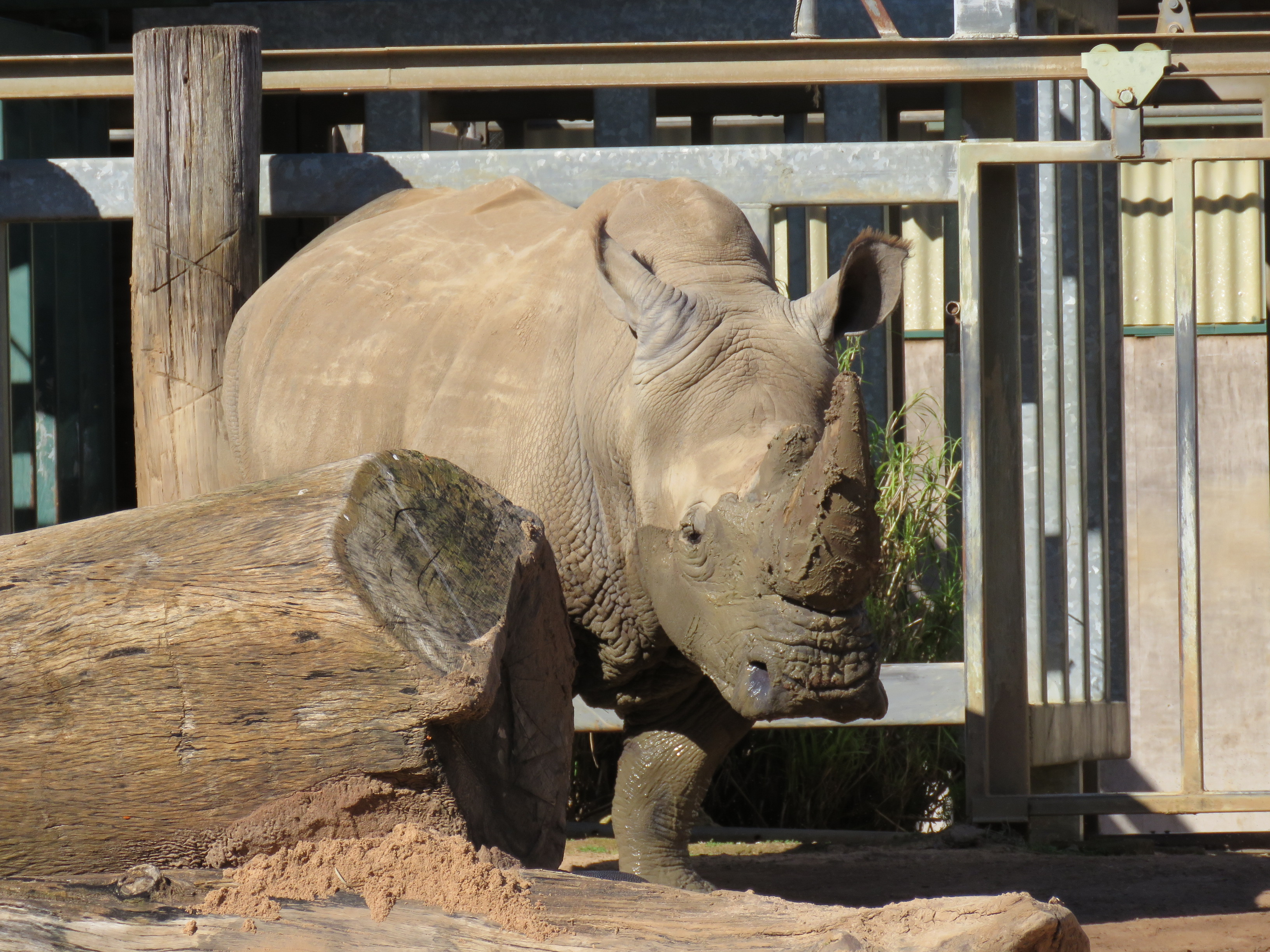
Southern white rhinoceros male Memphis, who has lived at Perth Zoo for over 35 years

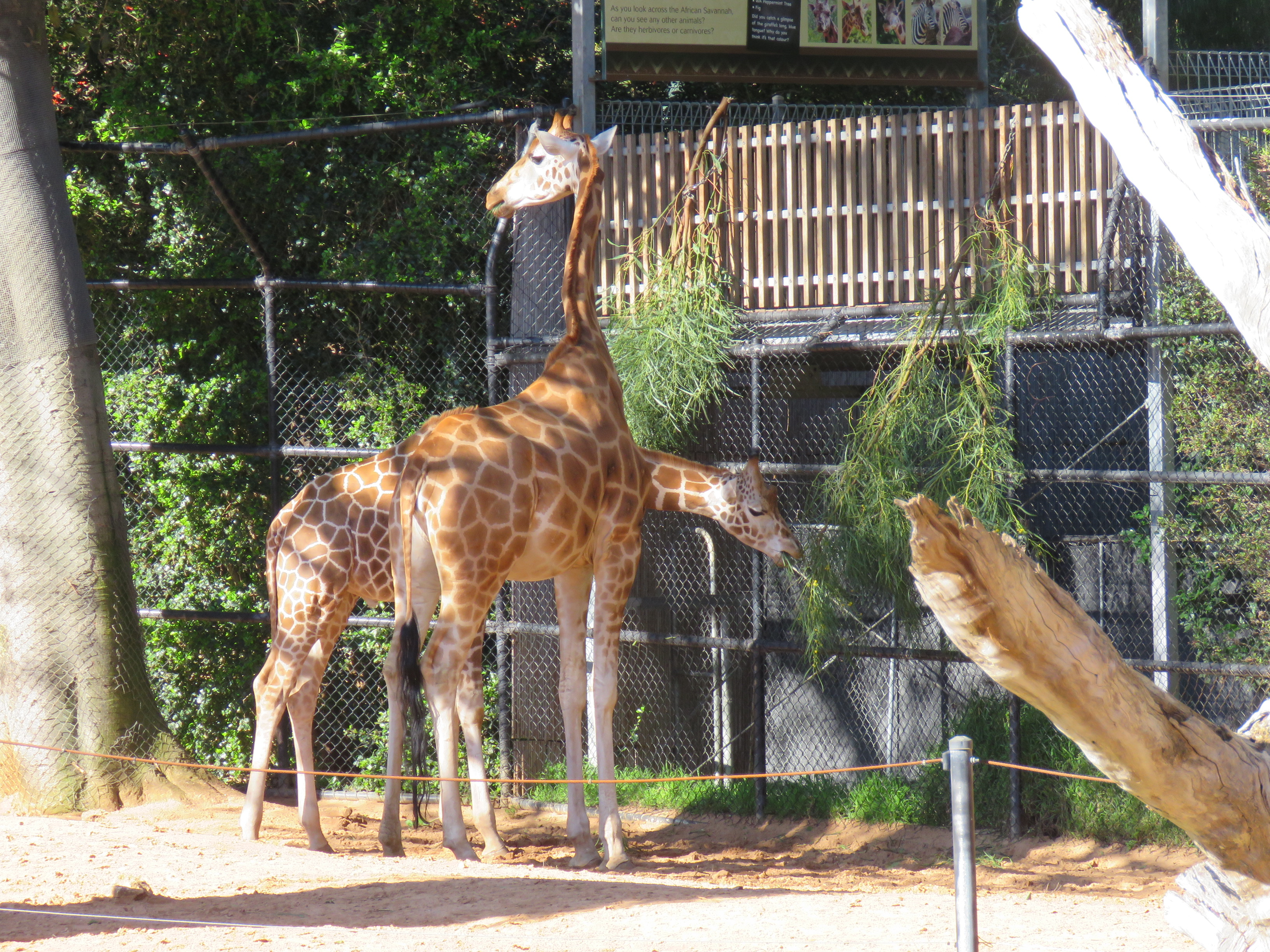
Rothschild's giraffes

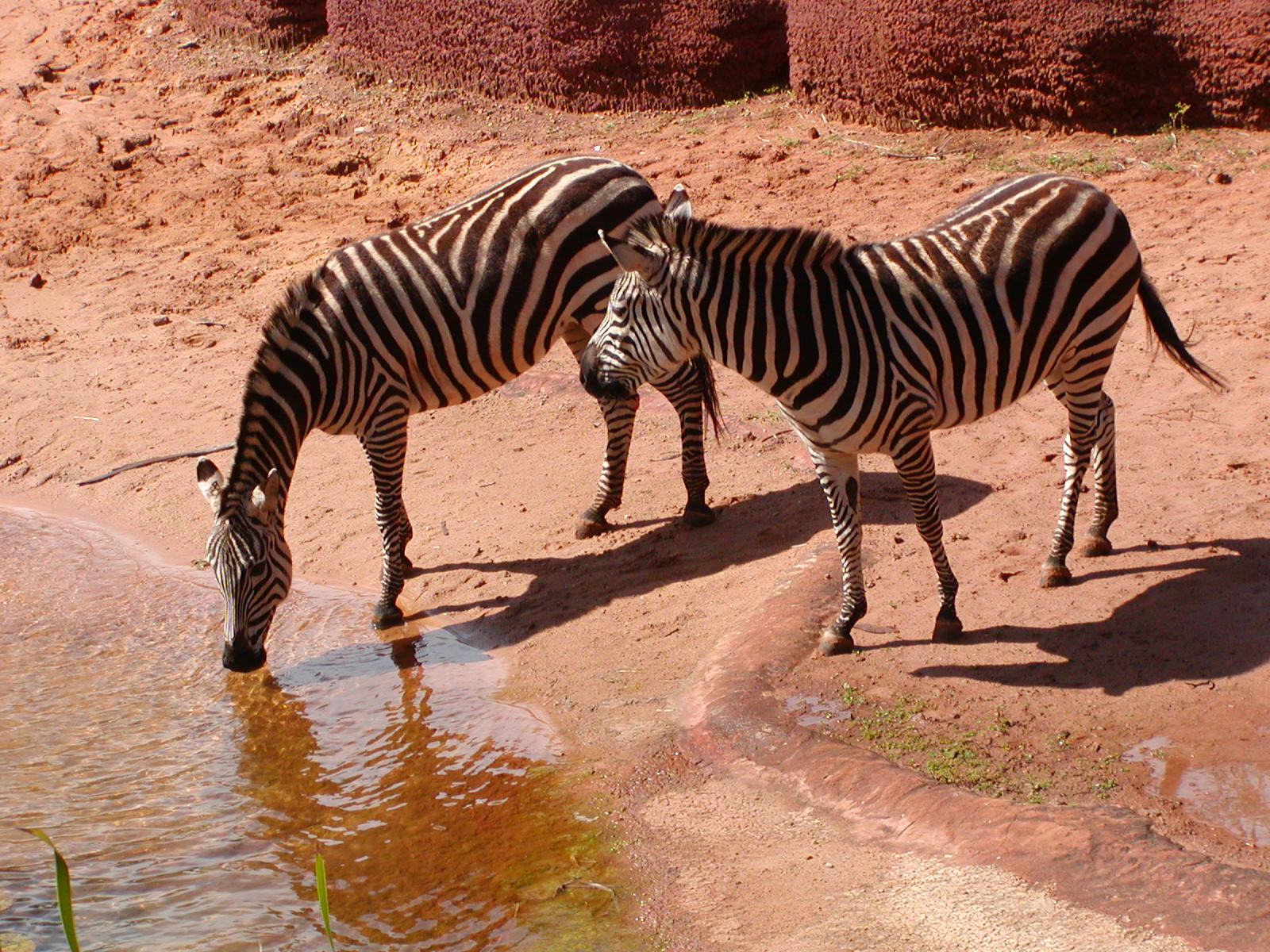
Plains zebras drinking at their waterhole they share with Rothschild's giraffes

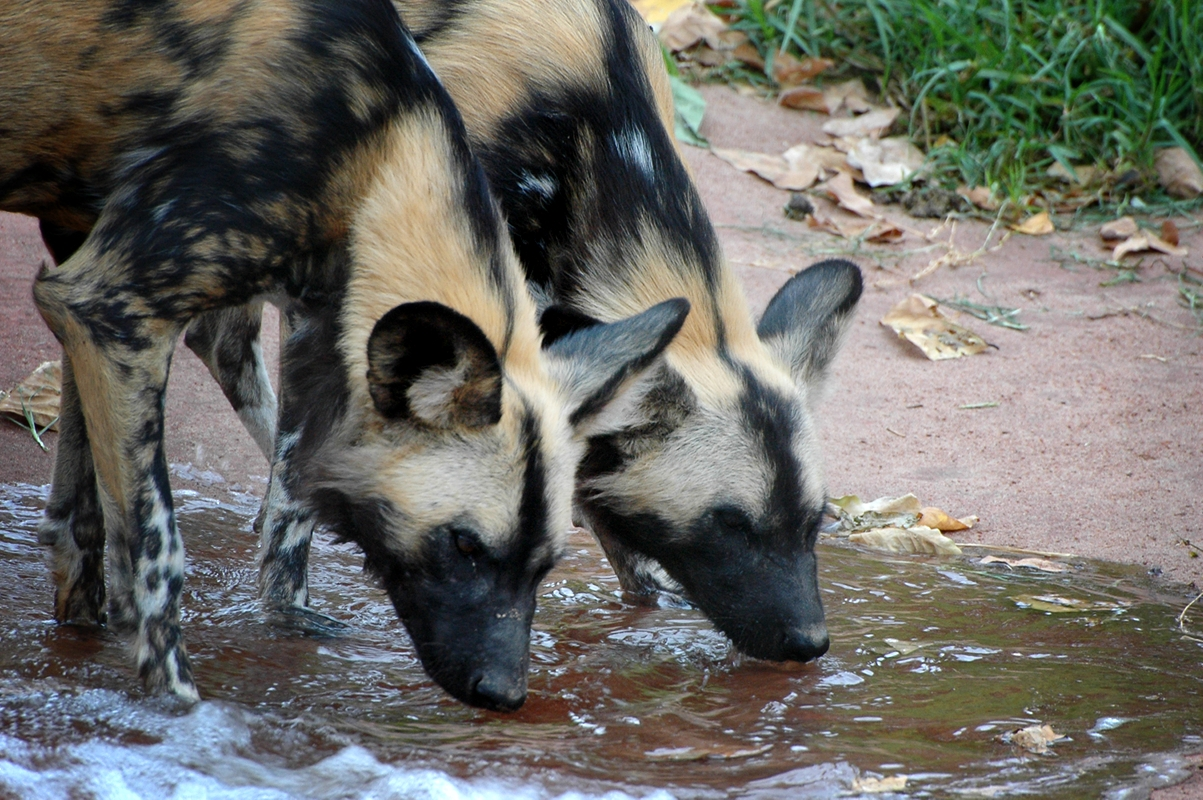
A pair of African painted dogs

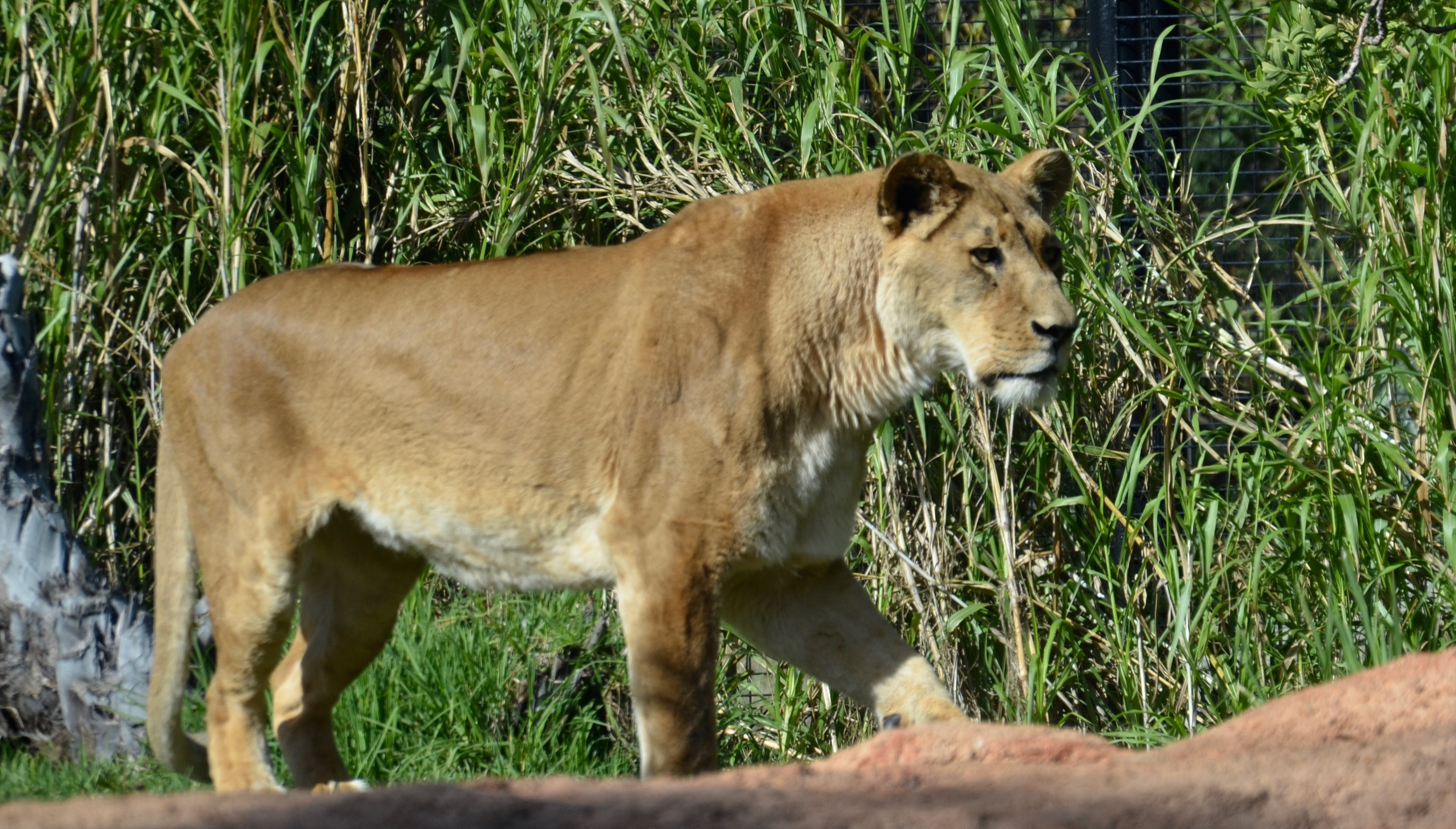
A female African lion (often referred to as a lioness)

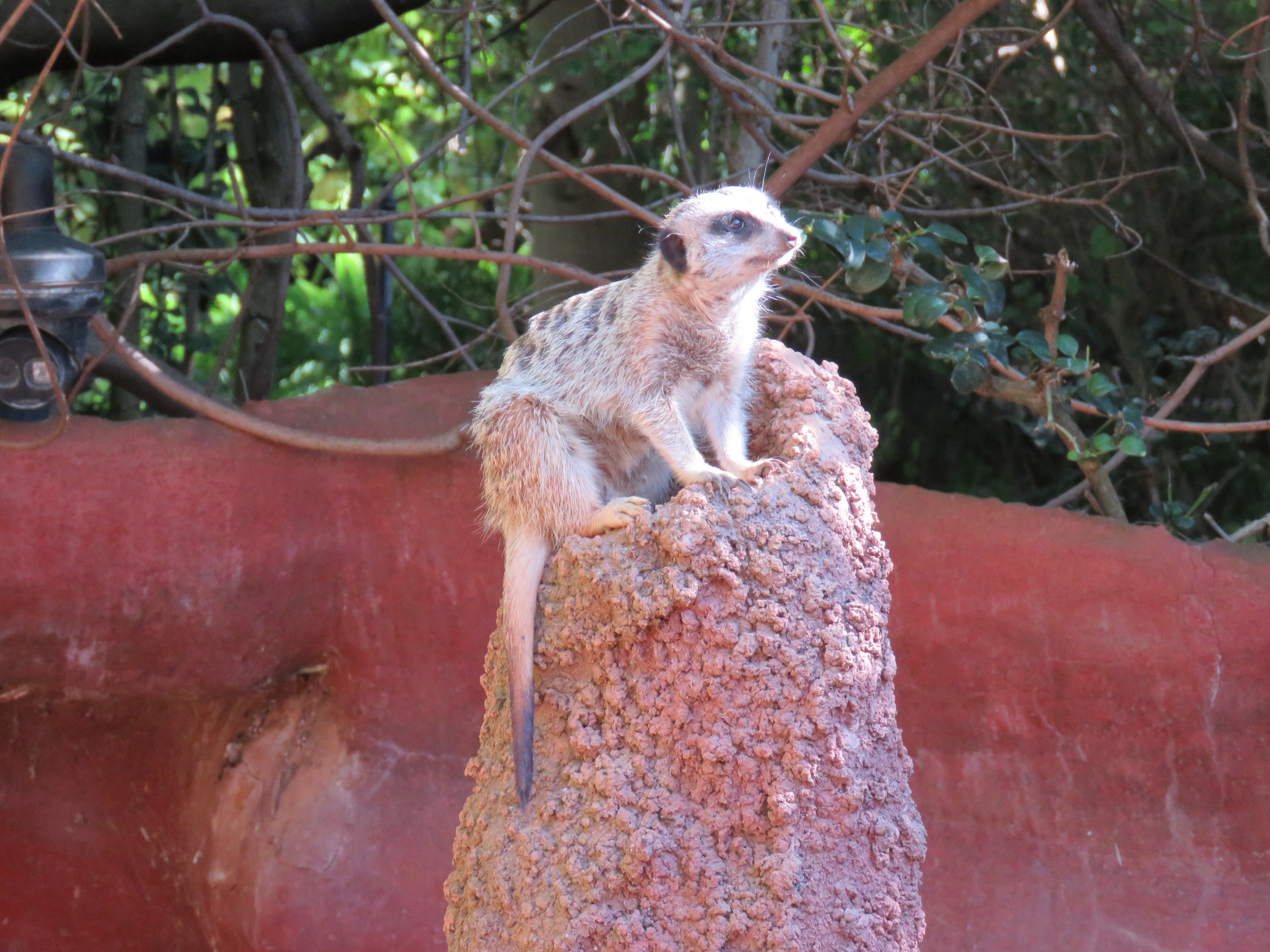
Meerkat on "sentry duty" in exhibit at the zoo

Additionally natives to the continent and islands of South America are housed in an area nearby in the zoo. This area has:

- Bolivian squirrel monkey
- Galápagos tortoise

=== Asian Rainforest ===
The Asian Rainforest opened in phases between 1984 and 2007 (officially named Asian Rainforest however in 1999), and is home to a number of threatened Asian species. These include:

- Asian small-clawed otter
- Binturong
- Komodo dragon
- Northern white-cheeked gibbon
- Sumatran orangutan
- Sun bear

The zoo contributes to the conservation of many of these species in the wild.

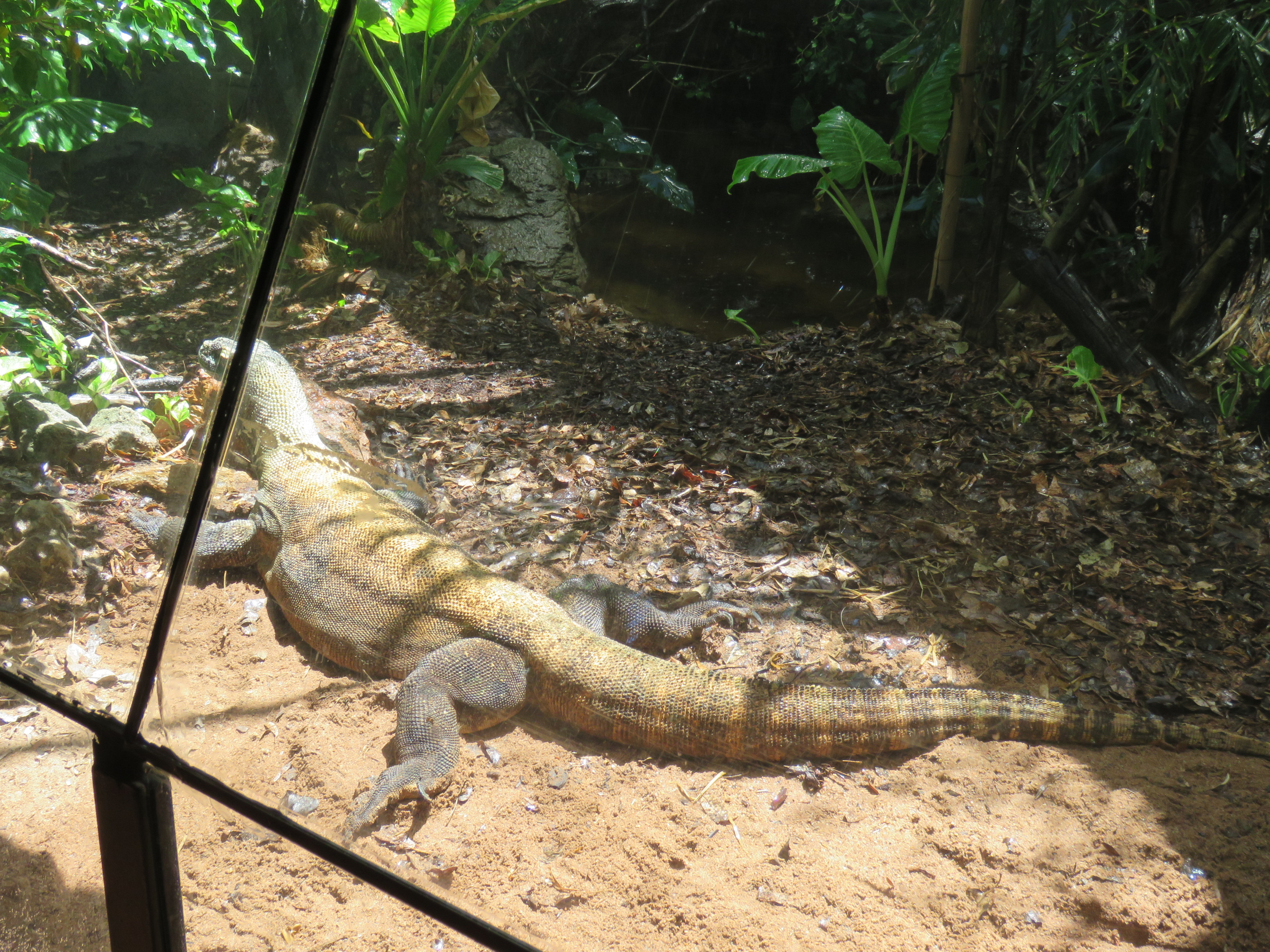
Raja the zoo's Komodo dragon seen behind visitor viewing glass into his exhibit

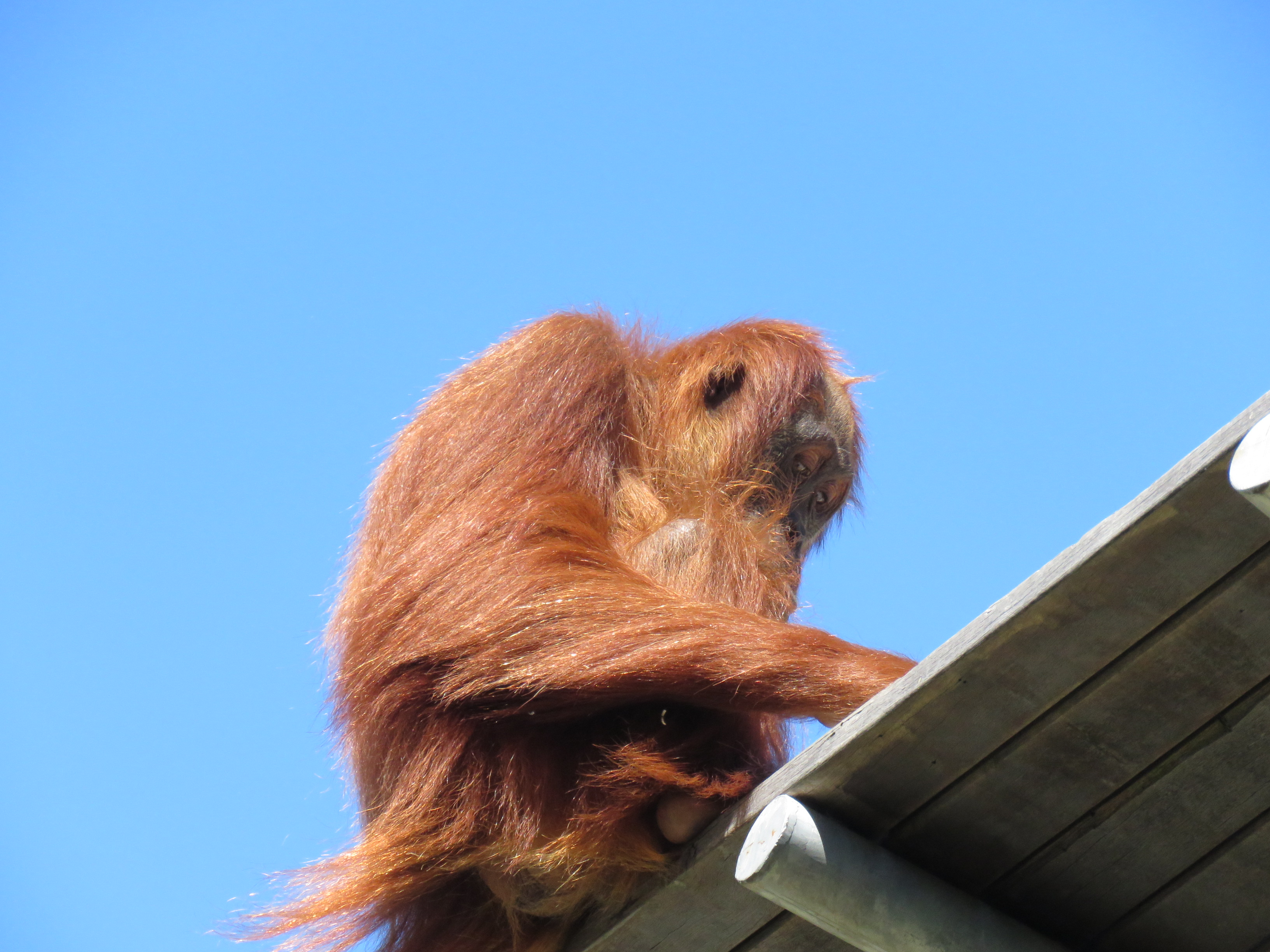
One of the zoo's Sumatran orangutans at the top of one of their climbing towers

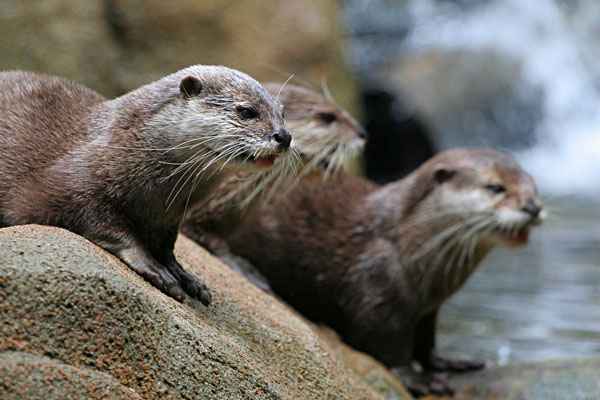
Family of the zoo's Asian small-clawed otters

=== Australian Bushwalk ===
The Australia Bushwalk opened in its current setup in 1997, and takes visitors on a journey through the Australian landscape where they can see:

- Bush stone-curlew
- Dingo
- Emu
- Koala
- Red kangaroo
- Short-beaked echidna
- Tammar wallaby
- Tasmanian devil
- Western brush wallaby
- Western grey kangaroo

A specially designed exhibit in this area visitors can access on a slight detour is the 'Numbats Under Threat' exhibit, which showcases the endangered Western Australian marsupial and several other species in both the large main enclosure and the walkthrough exhibit fronting the entrance. The species in this area are:

- Numbat
- Quokka
- Rufous whistler
- Splendid fairy-wren
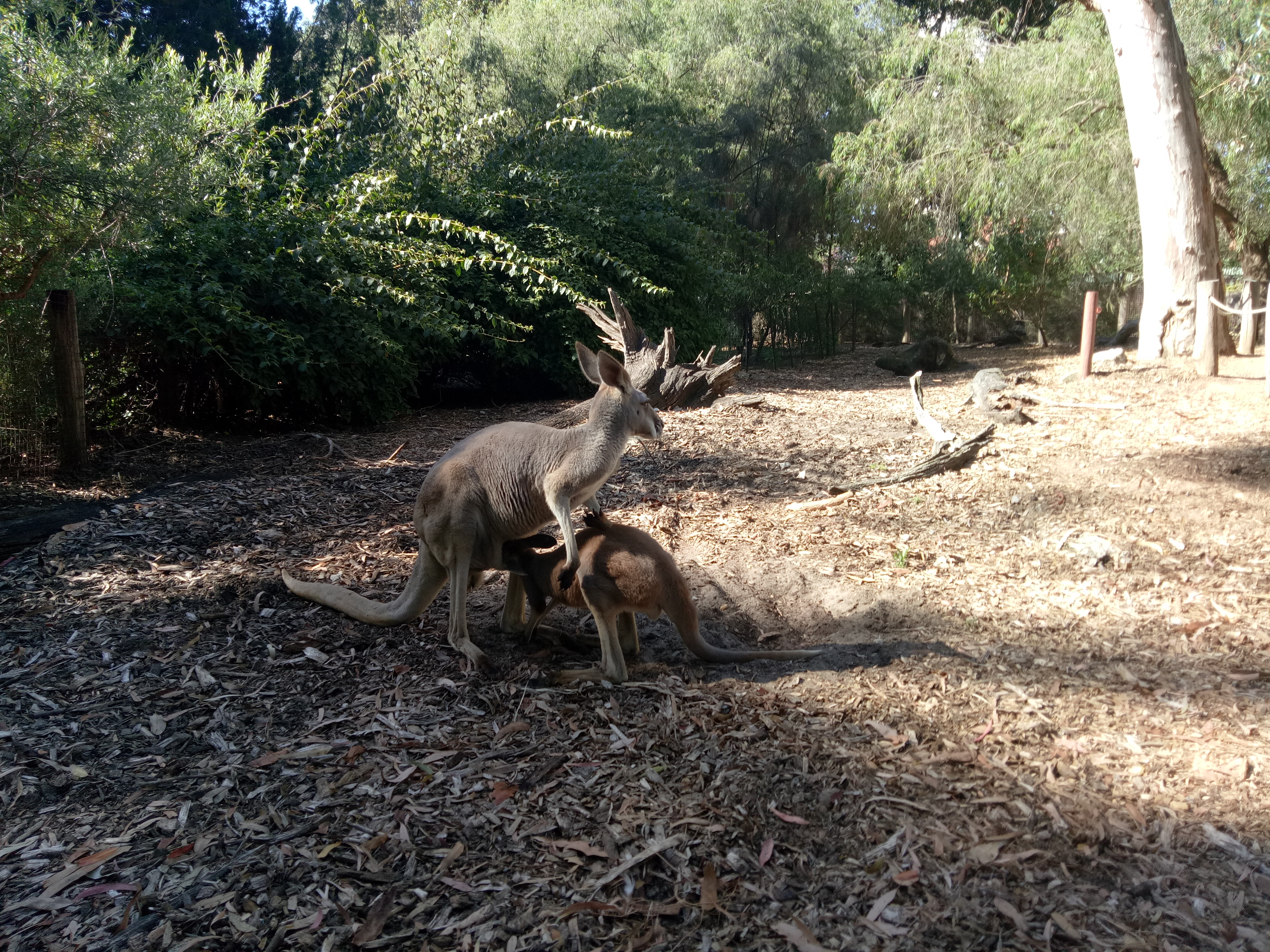
Red kangaroo female with her teenage joey at the zoo

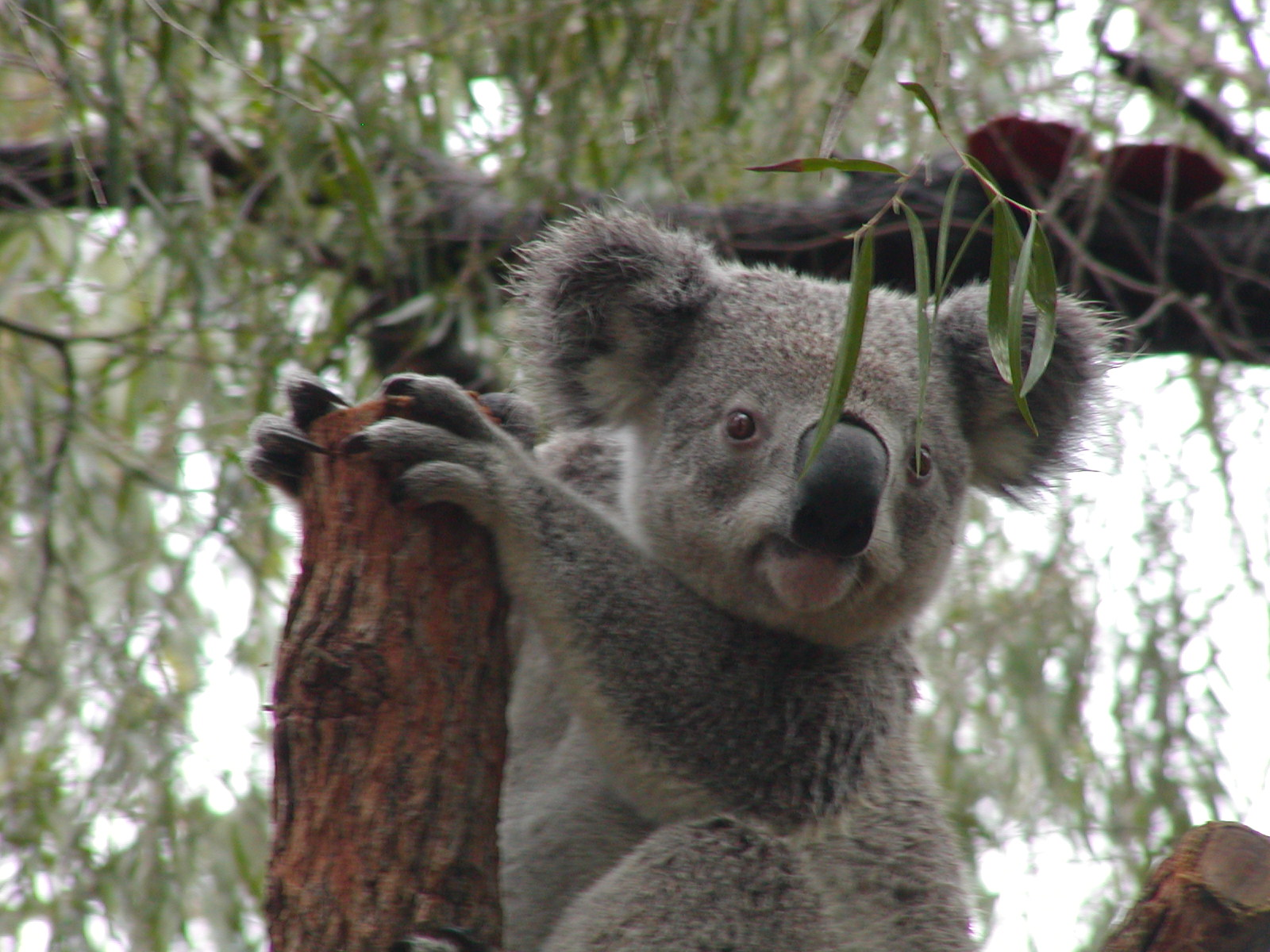
Koala at the zoo

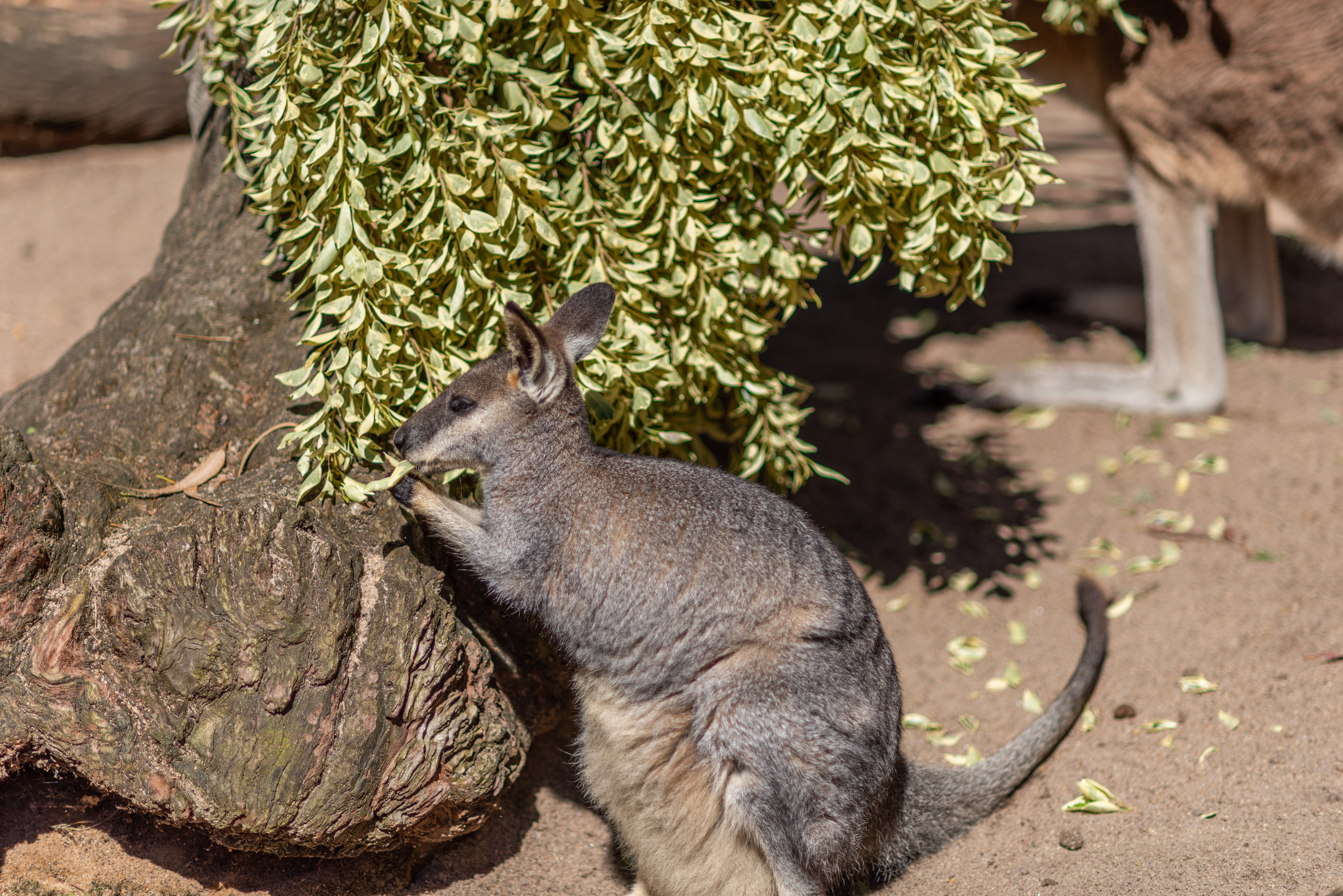
Western brush wallaby at the zoo

Another detour takes visitors to the 'Western Australian Black Cockatoo' exhibit aviaries, planted with cockatoo food trees and home to:

- Baudin's cockatoo
- Carnaby's black cockatoo
- Forest red-tailed black cockatoo

A walk-in aviary is located close in the 'Australian Bushwalk' area of the zoo and is home to:

- Black-winged stilt
- Blue-and-yellow macaw
- Brush bronzewing
- Elegant parrot
- Indian peafowl
- Purple-crowned lorikeet
- Sun conure

=== Australian Wetlands ===
This exhibit begins with an entrance building which exhibits:

- Green tree frog
- Splendid tree frog
- Western swamp turtle
- White-lipped tree frog

The Australian Wetlands main area is a 2,750-square-metre (29,600 sq ft) wetlands habitat which houses:

- Australasian shoveler
- Black swan
- Black-necked stork
- Black-winged stilt
- Blue-billed duck
- Brolga
- Bush stone-curlew
- Eastern great egret
- Freckled duck
- Glossy ibis
- Green pygmy goose
- Little pied cormorant
- Pied heron
- Plumed whistling duck
- Radjah shelduck
- Royal spoonbill

The main exhibit walkway leads to an area (built in 1998 and upgraded 2015) which exhibits for:

- Estuarine crocodile
- Freshwater crocodile

=== Penguin Plunge ===
Penguin Plunge opened in 1998 and includes a 50,000-litre (13,000 US gal) pool of filtered salt water with underwater viewing, a beach, a reef, and a rookery. The exhibit is home to:

- Australian little penguin
- Bridled tern
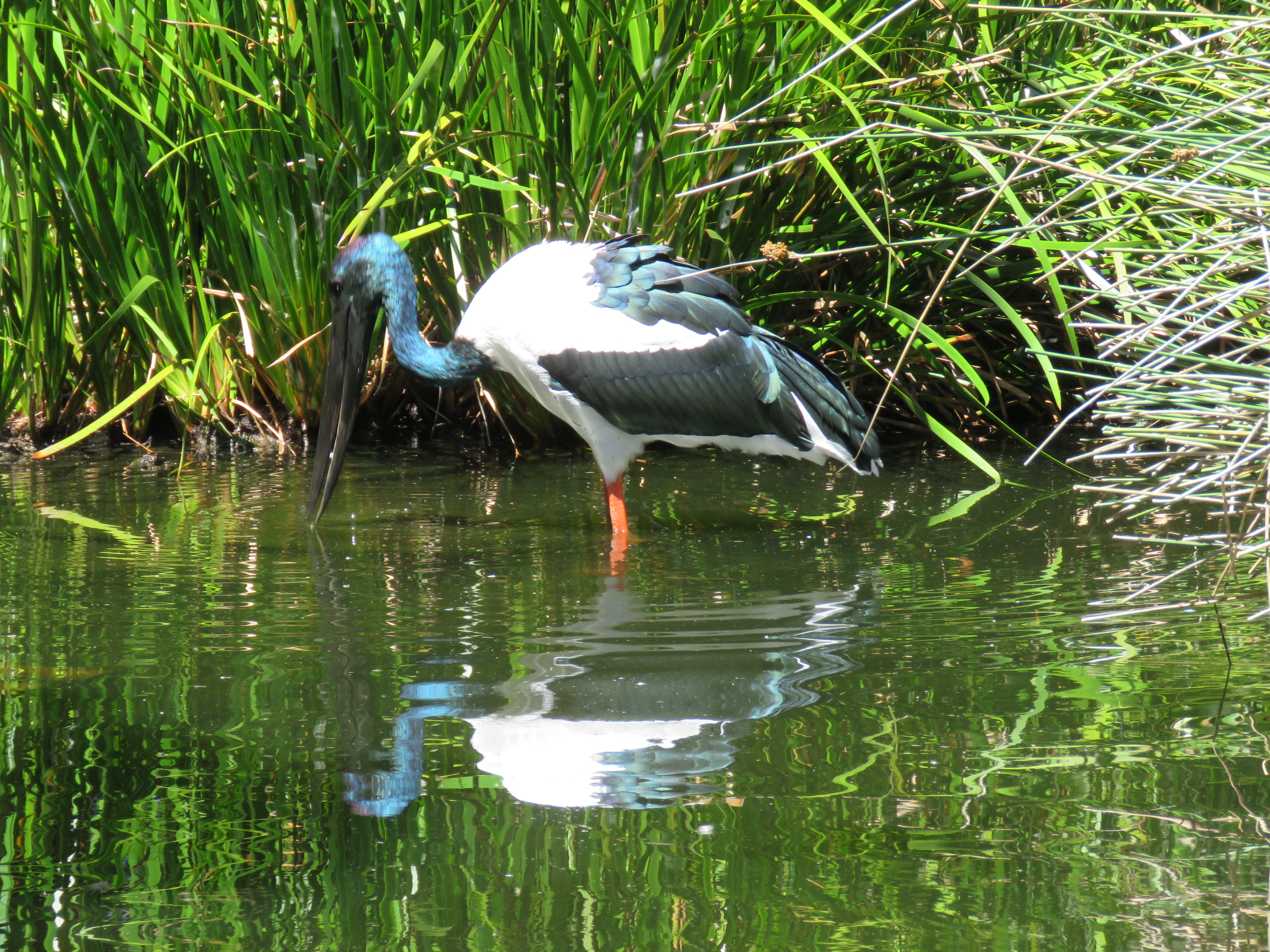
Black-necked stork in Wetlands walk-through exhibit

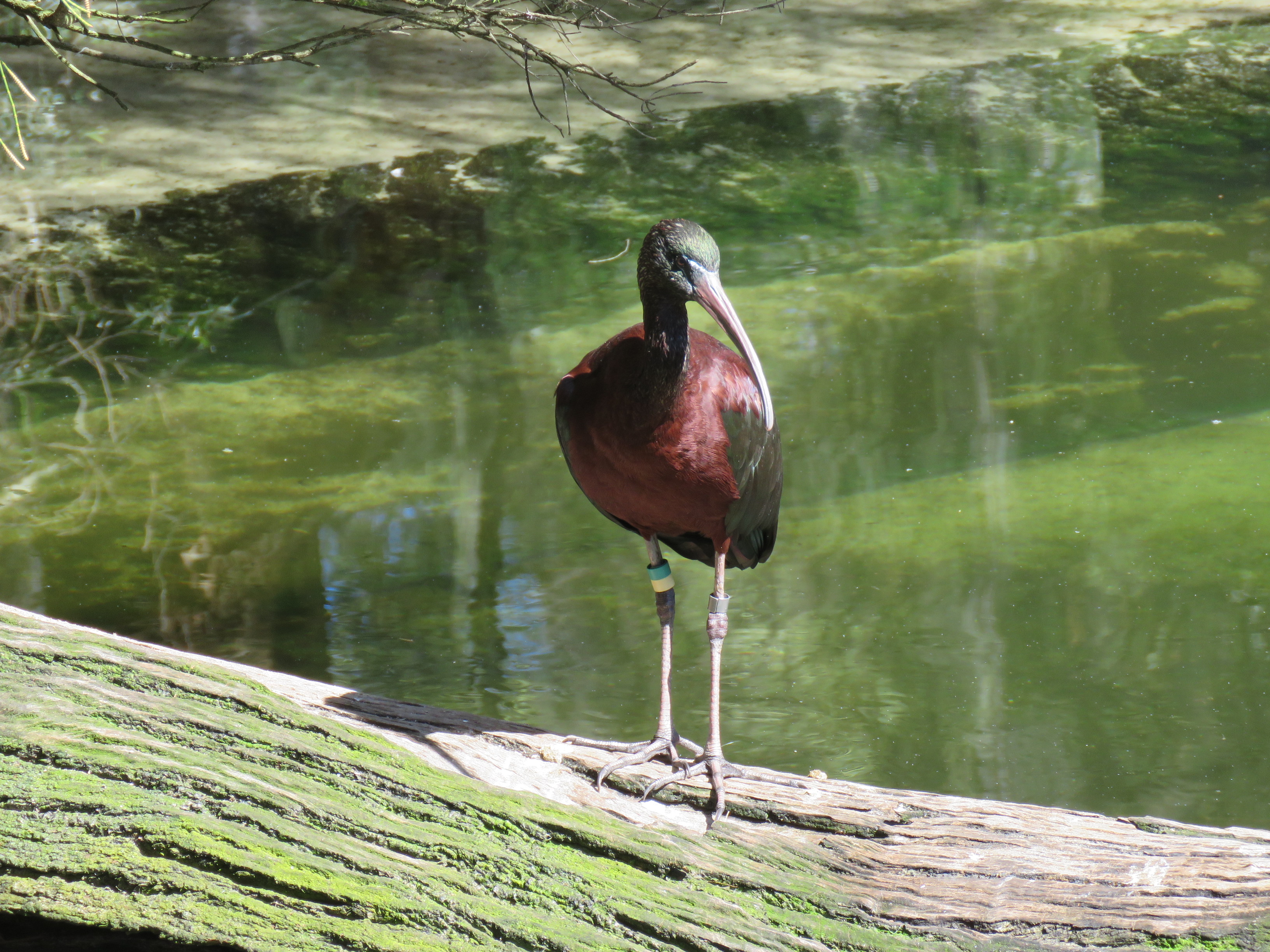
Glossy ibis in the Australian Wetlands habitat at the zoo

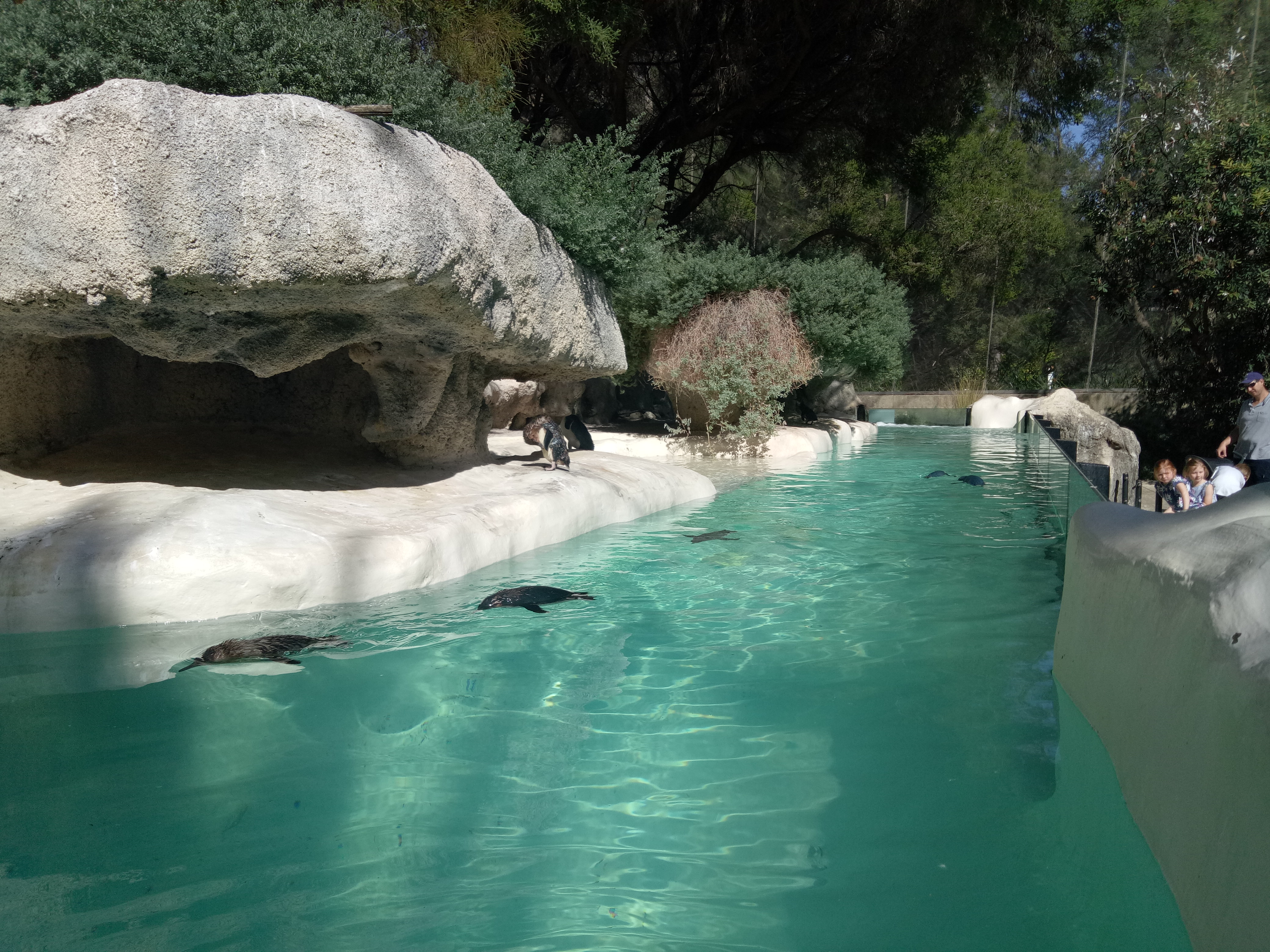
Little penguins in their Penguin Plunge exhibit

=== Nocturnal House ===
The Nocturnal House was opened in 1977 and is designed in a circular viewing layout that lets visitors circumnavigate the interior of the building while viewing nocturnal animals (mainly Australian-native species) under simulated moonlight. Species kept in this building include:

- Bilby
- Black-footed tree-rat
- Cane toad
- Chuditch
- Dibbler
- Feathertail glider
- Ghost bat
- Hide beetle
- Jungle carpet python
- Margaret River hairy marron
- Monteith's leaf insect
- Pilbara olive python
- Quenda
- Rough-scaled python
- Savannah glider
- Spiny leaf insect
- Sunda slow loris
- Tawny frogmouth
- Western ringtail possum

=== Primate Trail ===
The Primate Trail exhibit opened in 1985 and is home to lemurs and monkeys including:

- Black-and-white ruffed lemur
- Common marmoset
- Cotton-top tamarin
- Emperor tamarin
- Pygmy marmoset
- Ring-tailed lemur
- Red-rumped agouti (a pair are also housed in an exhibit in this part of the zoo)

=== Reptile Encounter ===
The Reptile Encounter reptile-house was opened on World Environment Day in June 1997. It contains 17 exhibits designed to match the animal's natural habitat. The building is climate controlled, and displays reptile species from around the world including:

- Bell's hinge-back tortoise
- Black-headed python
- Centralian blue-tongued skink
- Common death adder
- Corn snake
- Dugite
- Inland bearded dragon
- Madagascar giant day gecko
- Merten's water monitor
- Pebble-mimic dragon
- Perentie
- Pygmy spiny-tailed skink
- Rough-scaled python
- Southwestern carpet python
- Tiger snake
- Veiled chameleon
- Western blue-tongued skink
- Woma python

=== Gibbon Crossing ===
Opened in July 2025, the two large tropical islands on the zoo's main lake with tall trees are connected with hundreds of metres of aerial pathway ropes 14 metres (46 ft) high connected to a climbing tower base. The ropes extend out to the trees on the zoo's main lawn so the gibbons can climb along the rope pathways and back to the island habitats.

- Javan gibbon
- Northern white-cheeked gibbon

=== Main lake ===
Near the entrance to the zoo is the main lake, completed in 1972. Many different species of native water birds freely flock to the lake including:

- Australasian darter
- Australasian shoveler
- Australian pelican
- Australian shelduck
- Australian white ibis
- Black swan
- Black-faced cormorant
- Cattle egret
- Dusky moorhen
- Eurasian coot
- Gray teal
- Great cormorant
- Little black cormorant
- Little pied cormorant
- Nankeen night-heron
- Pacific black duck
- Silver gull
- White-eyed duck

A nearby tropical forest with a boardwalk through the centre is home to:

- Goodfellow's tree-kangaroo
- Southern cassowary

=== The Rainforest Retreat ===
The zoo's Rainforest Retreat was planted between 1994 and 1996, and is a 4,350-square-metre (46,800 sq ft) area of the zoo which showcases botanical flora of the tropical zones of the world through a winding rainforest path. Additionally, several species of threatened frogs have been bred and raised in this area of the zoo for wild release, including sunset frog, orange-bellied frog and white-bellied frog.

== Additional Photo Gallery ==
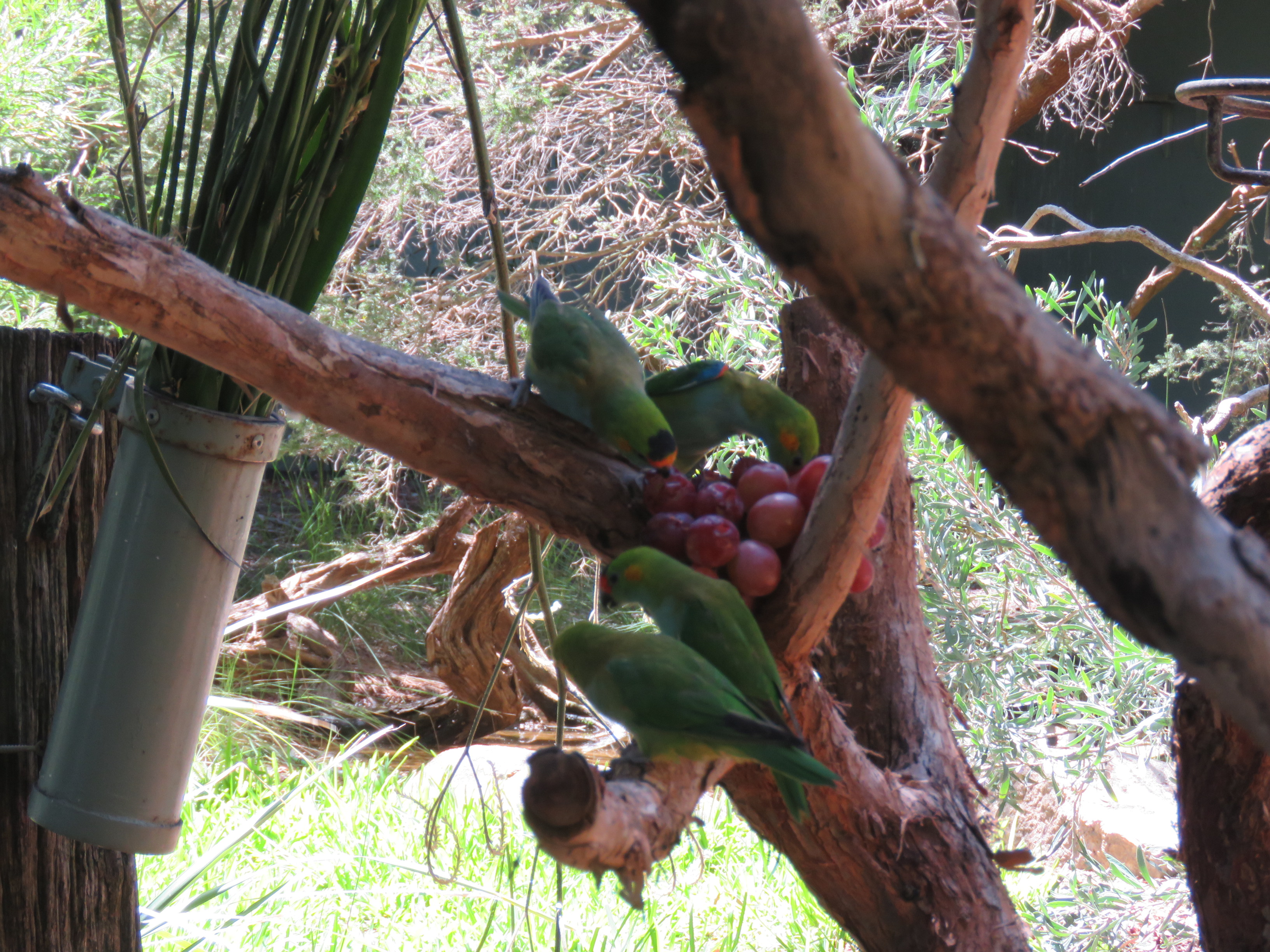
Purple-crowned lorikeets at the zoo

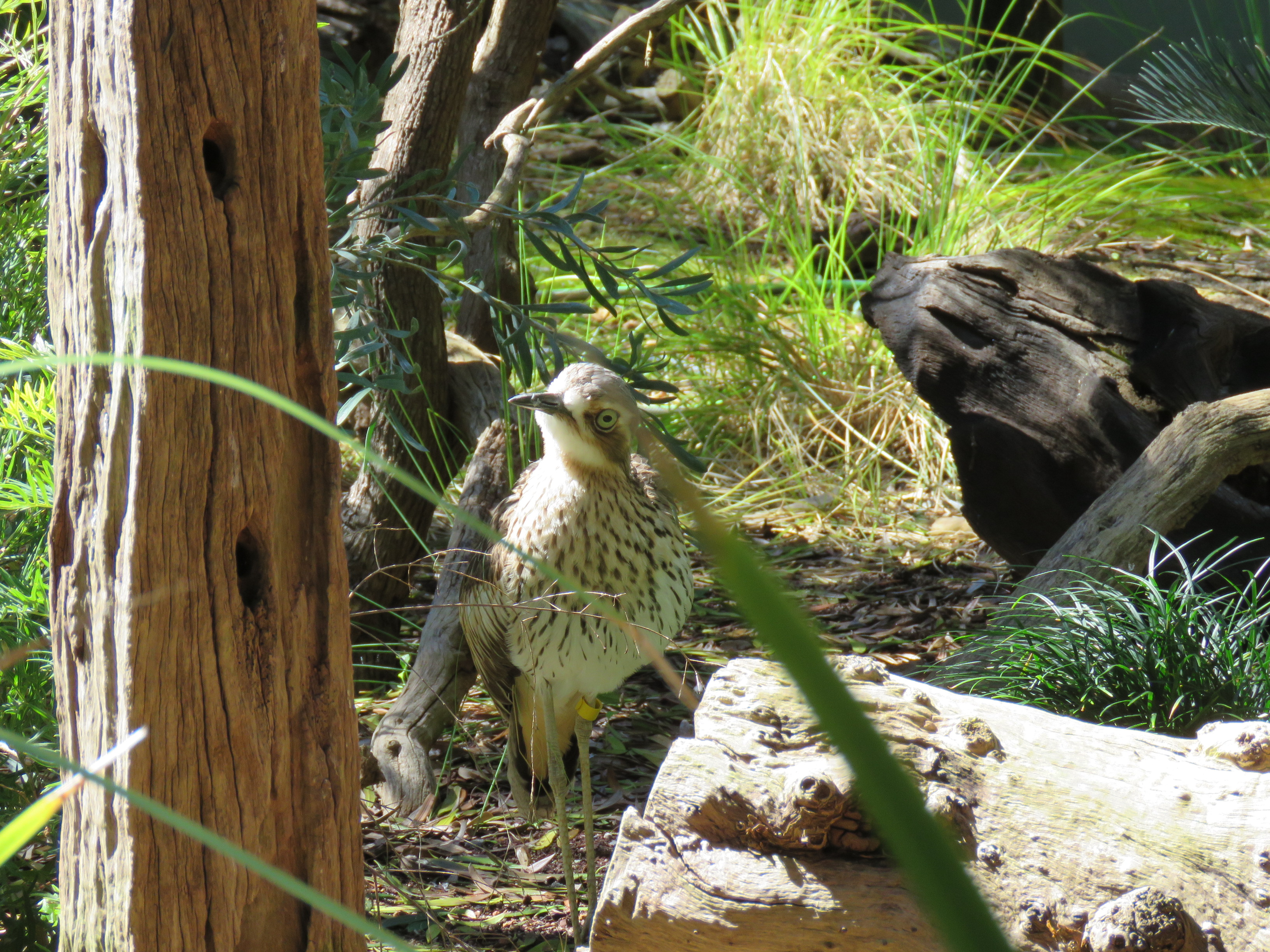
Bush stone-curlew in Bushwalk exhibit

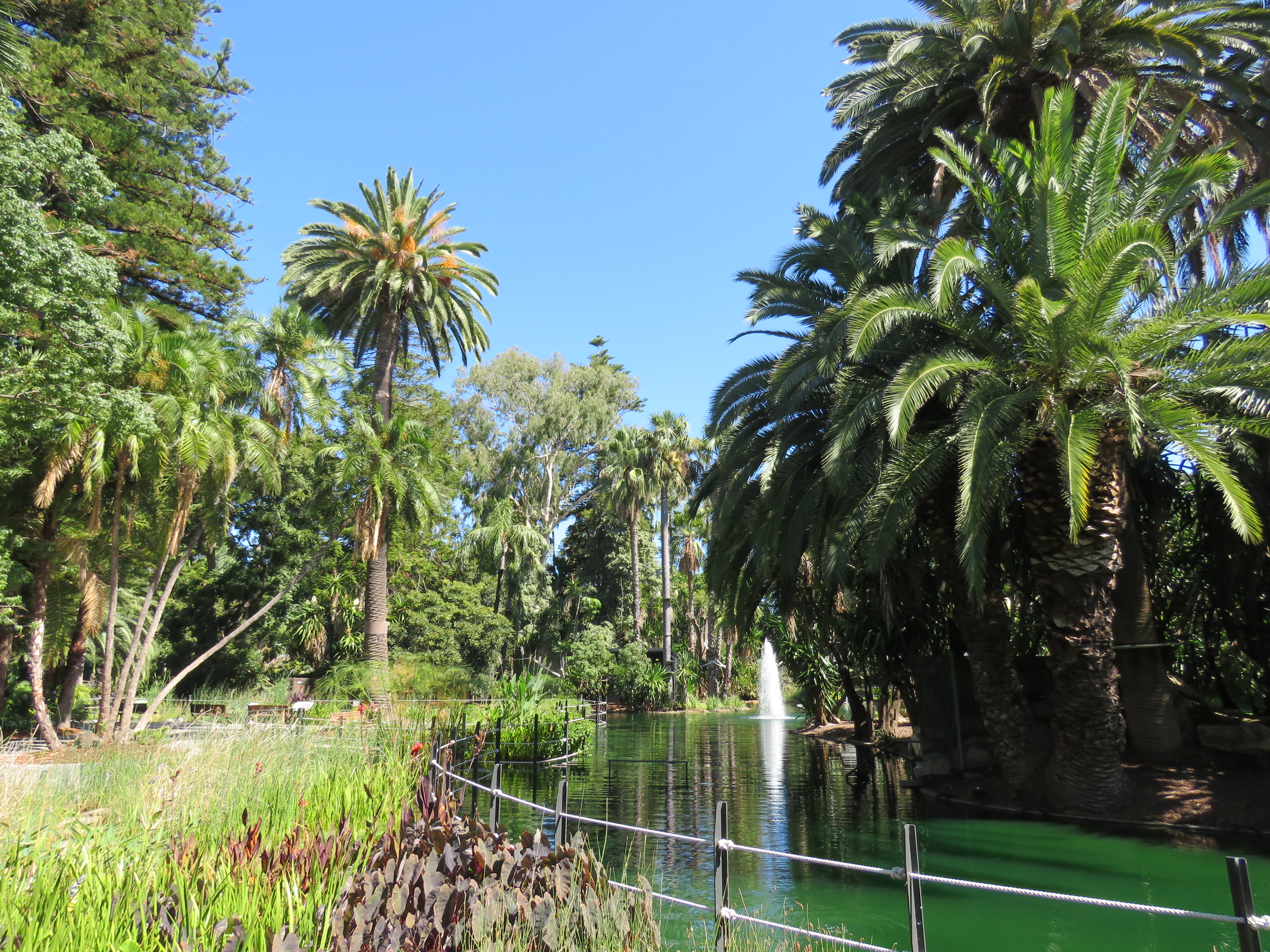
The zoo's Main Lake

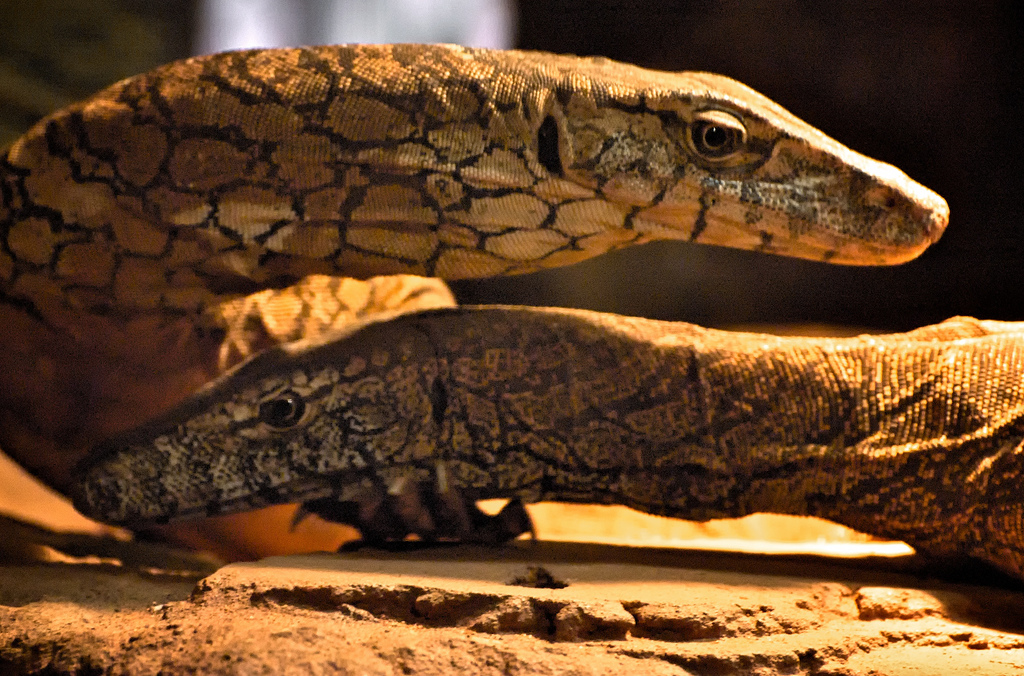
Perenties in the zoo's Reptile Encounter reptile-house

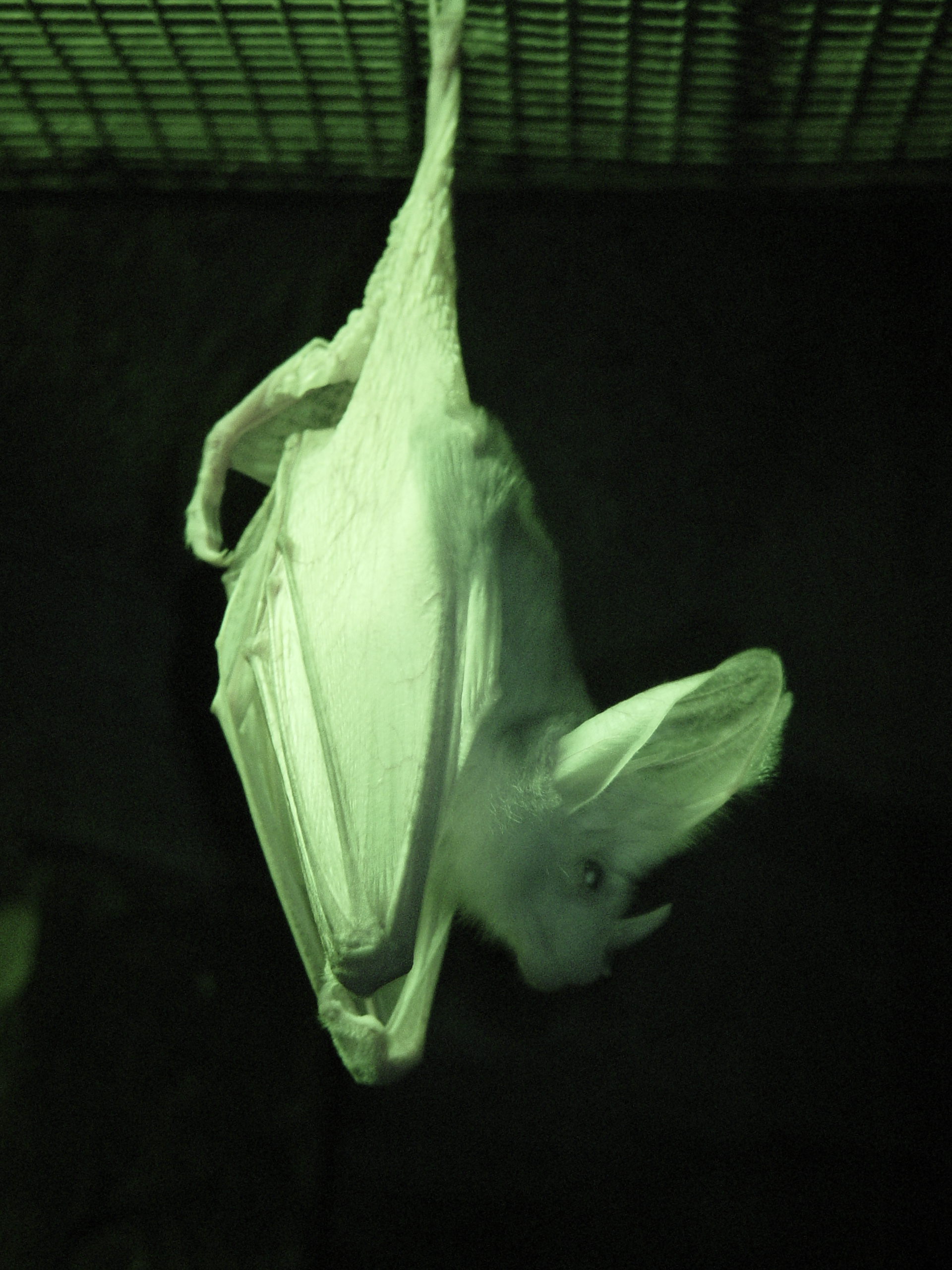
Ghost bat in the Nocturnal House

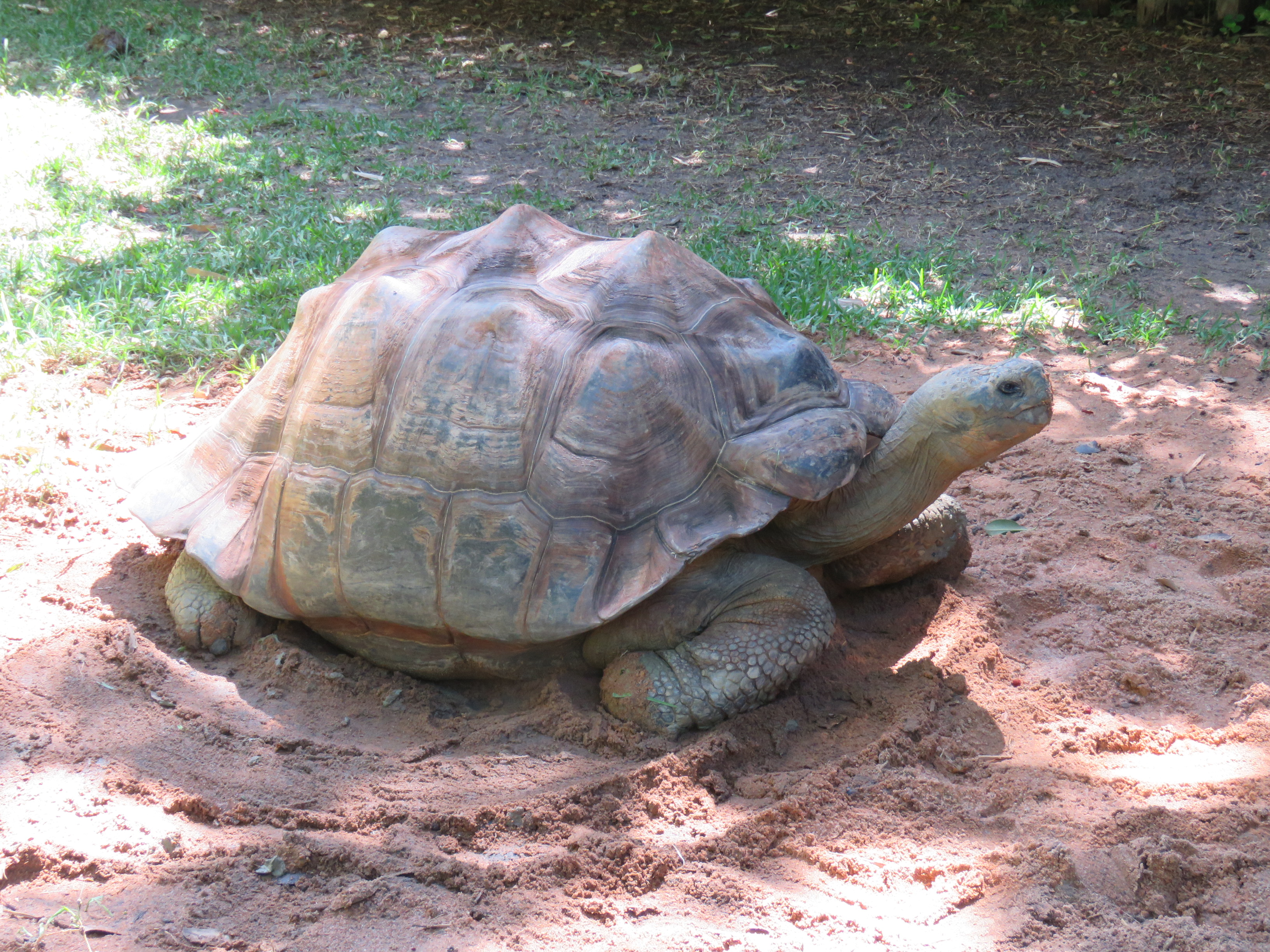
Cerro the zoo's Galápagos tortoise

== Scenic Heritage Trail ==
The Scenic Heritage Trail is a self-guided walk that takes visitors around the zoo and shows off its historical buildings. (Note: A map of the trail is available online, but may also be obtained from the Information Centre.) Buildings included in this walk are the bird feed shed, kite cage, bear caves, hay shed, mineral baths from 1898, replicas of tennis shelters from 1903, the Scout Hall built in 1931, the 1947 carousel that is still in use, and the Gate Zoo Residence that was built in the 1960s.

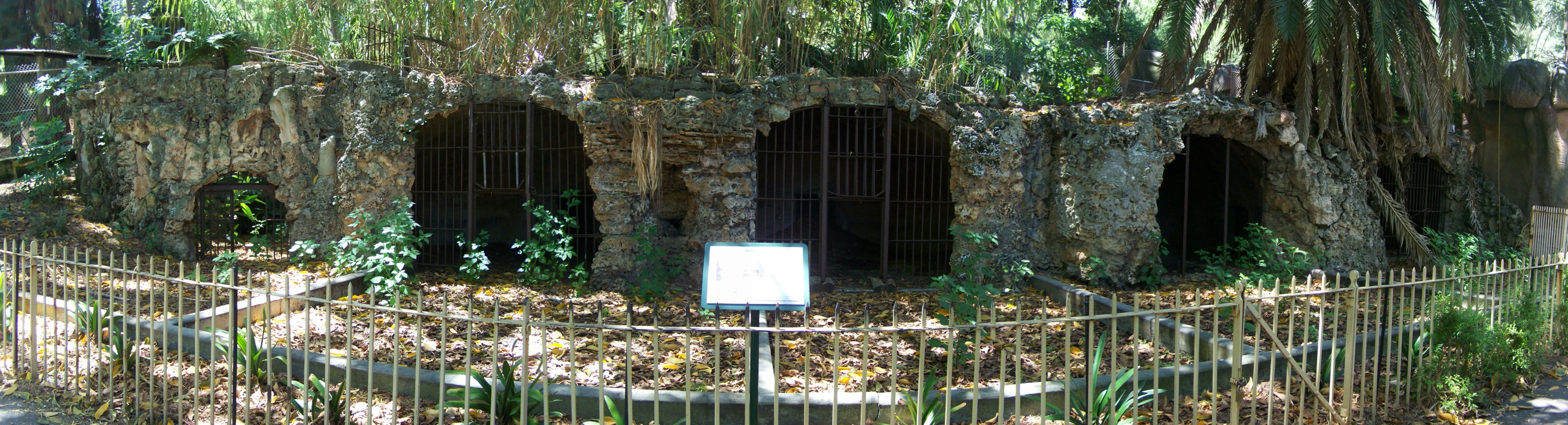
The zoo's former Bear Caves; a bygone era of the zoo, are kept as historical reminder of vast animal care improvements

== Conservation ==
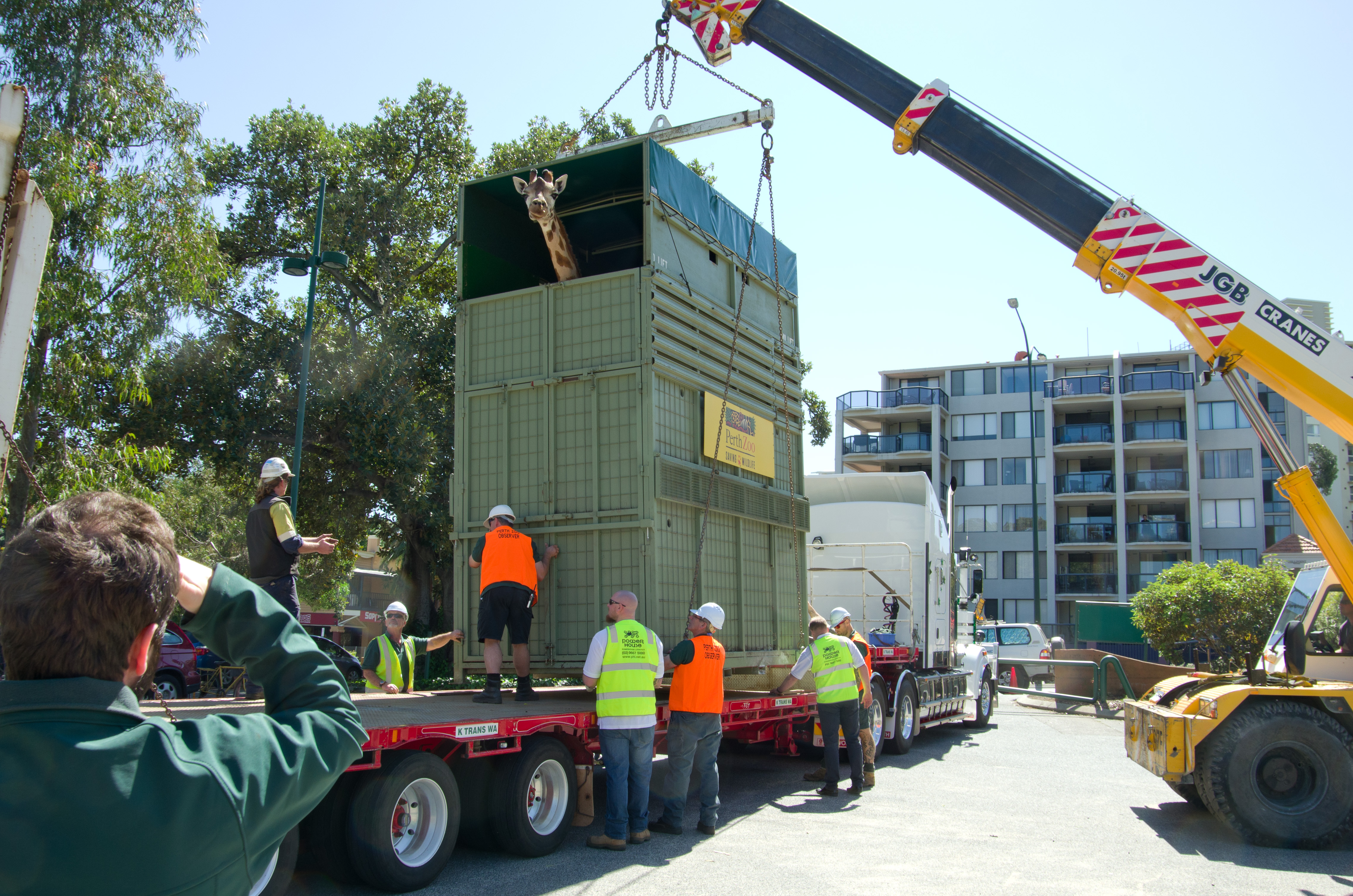
Asali, a Rothschild's giraffe, leaving Perth Zoo for Monarto Safari Park after being part of the breeding program

The zoo participates in a number of breeding programs for endangered species, both native Australian and non-native species. Some Australian species are bred for release into managed habitats in Western Australia, whereas the non-native species are for increasing genetic diversification in zoo population.

=== Exotic species ===
Perth Zoo contributes to the conservation of threatened species in the wild through its fundraising program. Started in 2007, funds raised have been used for the conservation of African painted dogs, Asian elephants, Goodfellow's tree-kangaroos, Javan gibbons, northern white-cheeked gibbons, Rothschild's giraffes, southern white rhinoceroses, Sumatran orangutans, and sun bears; and from 1994-2025 Sumatran tigers (plan to again in near future). More than A$881,000 has been raised since the program began.

Many individuals of these species have been born at the zoo and later contributed to further generations of international and regional captive-breeding programs.

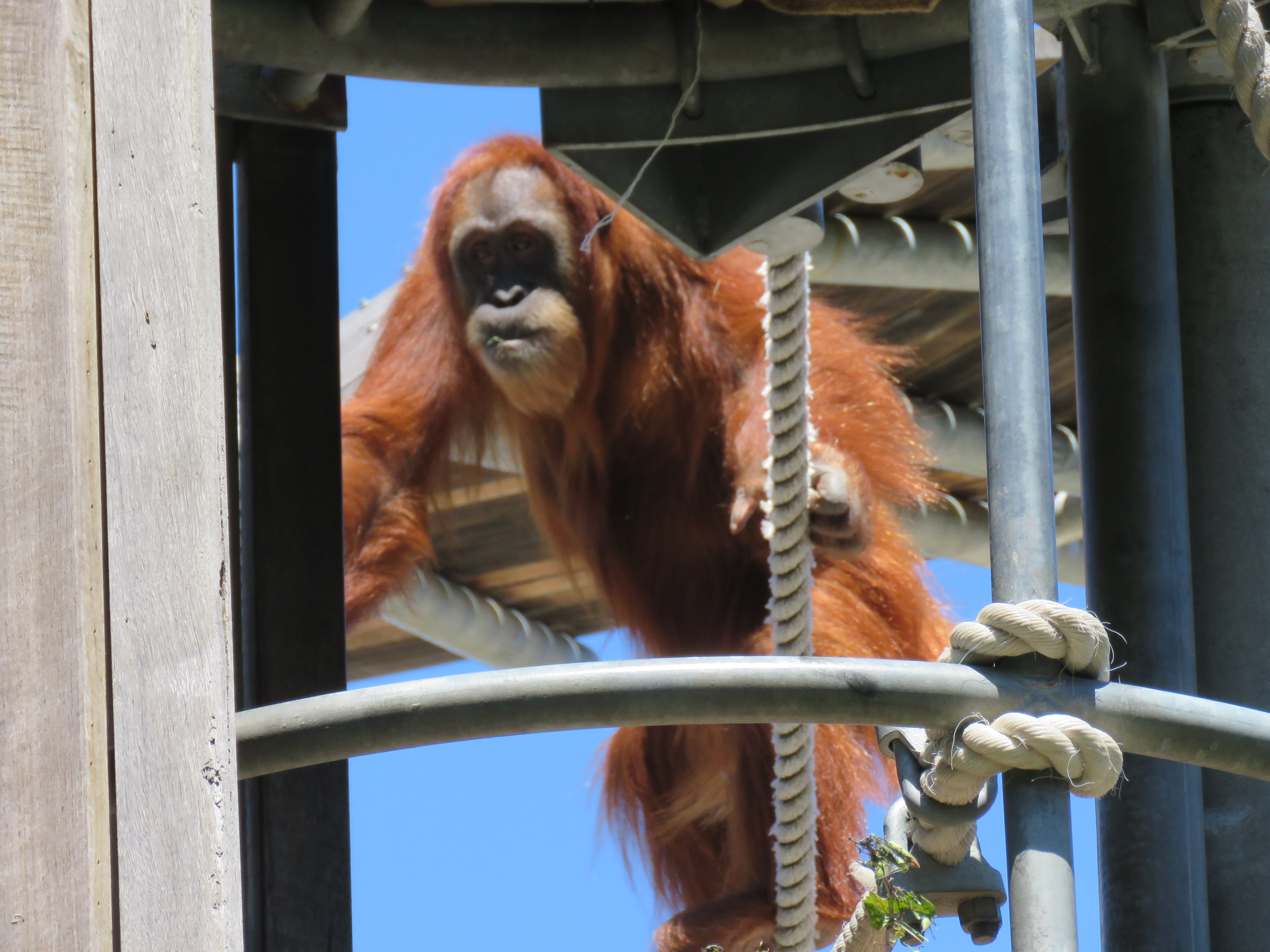
The zoo has had a long successful conservation program with endangered Sumatran orangutans, breeding twenty-three individuals from 1970–2012. Three individuals born at Perth Zoo have been released into the wild in Sumatra in 2006, 2011 and 2016 respectively.

The zoo's Sumatran orangutan breeding program is one of the most successful in the world, having bred twenty-three Sumatran orangutans between 1970 and 2012 (and additionally eight hybrid Bornean-Sumatran orangutans in the 1970s before its different species status was known; the hybrid orangutans were later sent to zoos in India). In 2006, 2011 and 2016, zoo-born Sumatran orangutans were released into the wild in Bukit Tigapuluh National Park in Sumatra as part of an international program to re-establish a wild population of the critically endangered ape.

Since 2006, Perth Zoo has made a significant contribution to conservation projects in the Bukit Tigapuluh National Park and the surrounding forested areas which support a rich diversity of life including a new colony of orangutans. These orangutans are part of an international program to reintroduce rescued ex-pet and orphaned Sumatran orangutans into the wild to establish a new population of this critically endangered species. More than 139 orangutans have been released into the area and some have bred.

In November 2006, Perth Zoo released 14-year-old, Perth Zoo-born Sumatran orangutan Temara into Bukit Tigapuluh as part of the reintroduction program. Temara was the first zoo-born orangutan in the world to be released into the wild. This was followed in 2011 with the release of the first male zoo-born orangutan, Semeru, into the wild, and in 2016 by another male Nyaru in the wild of Sumatra. Perth Zoo works with the Frankfurt Zoological Society, the Indonesian Government and the Australian Orangutan Project on this program and other conservation activities in Bukit Tigapuluh.

Puteri (born 1970) is the first of the Sumatran orangutan to be born at the zoo. She has lived at Perth Zoo her entire life, and birthed six second-generation Sumatran orangutans (including Temara).

=== Native species ===
The zoo's fundraising program has also contributed towards native Australian species under threat in the wild.

Working with the Department of Environment and Conservation, Perth Zoo breeds threatened Western Australian animal species for release into managed areas of habitat in the wild as part of its Native Species Breeding Program. As of 2011, Perth Zoo breeds species including dibblers, numbats, western swamp turtles, woylies and threatened Western Australian frog species.

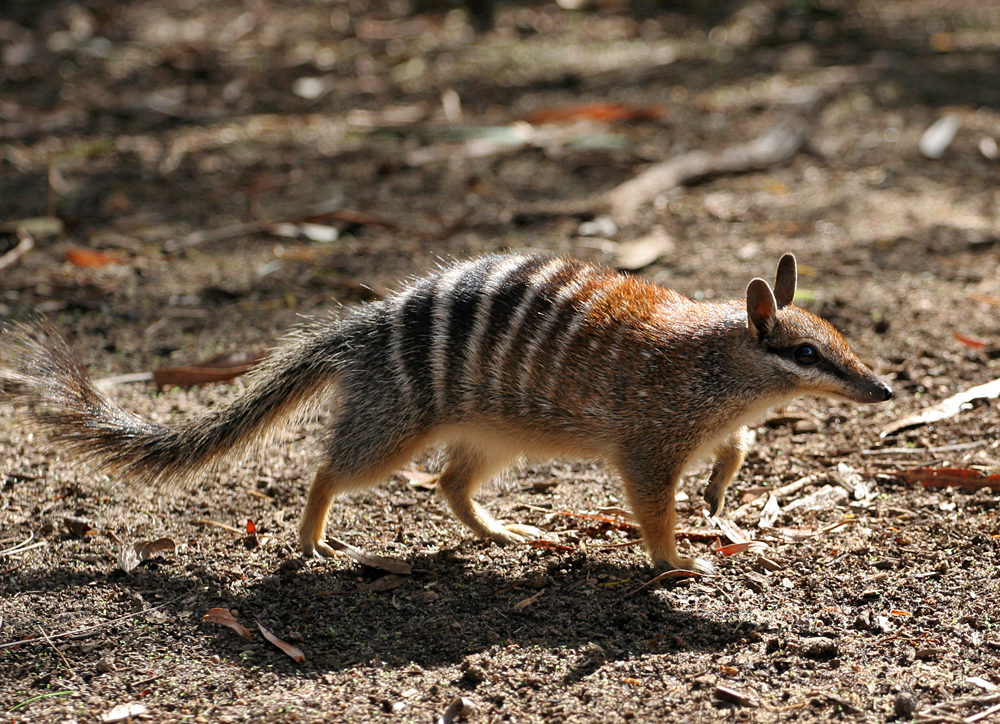
A numbat, one of the many species to benefit from Perth Zoo's involvement.

The numbat (Myrmecobius fasciatus), Western Australia's mammal emblem and one of only two diurnal marsupials, is the only Australian mammal to feed exclusively on termites. Despite the establishment of several populations by the Department of Environment and Conservation, it is still classified as endangered by the IUCN. Perth Zoo has been breeding numbats for release into the wild since 1986. The first successful birth was in 1993. By early 2011, 165 numbats had been provided by the zoo for release into protected habitat. In 2022, Perth Zoo bred 13 numbat joeys, and released 10 of them (and a wild rescued female) into Mallee Cliffs National Park in New South Wales.

The western swamp turtle (Pseudemydura umbrina) is a short-necked freshwater turtle and Australia's most critically endangered reptile. The western swamp tortoise has only been recorded at scattered localities in a narrow, three-to-five-kilometre (1.9 to 3.1 mi) strip of the Swan Coastal Plain. Since 1988, Perth Zoo has bred more than 500 western swamp tortoises. The main barrier to the further recovery of the species is the lack of suitable habitat. Despite this barrier, in 2022 Perth Zoo released 191 western swamp turtles into Scott National Park and bush around Moore River area.

The dibbler (Paranthechinus apicalis) is a small carnivorous marsupial found on two islands off the coast of Jurien Bay (island dibblers) and on the south coast of Western Australia within the Fitzgerald River National Park (mainland dibblers). It once had a much wider distribution, but is now classified as endangered by the IUCN. Perth-Zoo-bred dibblers were used to establish a new population on Escape Island in Jurien Bay. The focus has now changed to breeding dibblers from Fitzgerald River National Park for release on the mainland. By early 2011, over 500 dibblers had been provided by the zoo for release into protected habitat. Additionally between 2019 and 2023, 203 dibblers bred at Perth Zoo have been released into Dirk Hartog Island National Park. The Dibbler conservation breeding program was completed in 2023 after 26 years (beginning 1997) with 1,173 captive bred individuals born and released into protected wilderness areas during the program.

The frog breeding program is seeking to increase populations of threatened species, including those listed as vulnerable Spicospina flammocaerulea (sunset frog) and Geocrinia vitellina (orange-bellied frog), and the critically endangered Anstisia alba (white-bellied frog), the latter species being one example of the zoo's success with its captive breeding programs, having bred and released 1,250 white-bellied frogs back into the wild.

=== Previous breeding programs ===
The chuditch (Dasyurus geoffroi) or western quoll, is one of four quoll species in Australia and is the largest marsupial predator in Western Australia. At the time of European settlement, chuditch occurred in approximately 70% of the continent. By the late 1980s, they had become endangered, with less than 6,000 remaining in the south-west of Western Australia. Perth Zoo has bred more than 300 chuditch for release in the last decade. Since the breeding program began, the status of chuditch has been modified from endangered to vulnerable. This breeding program is now complete.

Shark Bay mouse (Pseudomys fieldi) also known as djoongari, prior to 1993 the only known population of djoongari was on Bernier Island in the north-west of Western Australia, adjacent to the Shark Bay region and was considered to be one of Australia's most geographically restricted animals. Over 300 Perth-Zoo-bred djoongari have been released to sites on the mainland and on islands in the north-west of Western Australia. This breeding program is now complete.

The central rock rat (Zyzomys pedunculatus) is a critically endangered rodent that was presumed extinct until it was rediscovered in the MacDonnell Ranges in 1996. The last of the zoo's central rock rats were sent to Alice Springs Desert Park in 2007 and the breeding program closed.

== General references ==
- The Handbook of the Zoological and Botanical Gardens, South Perth, Western Australia. Perth, Western Australia: F. W. Simpson, Government printer. 1937 [1934]. OCLC 220620216.
- Jenkins, Clee Francis Howard (1966) [1962]. Illustrated guide, zoological gardens, Labouchere Road, South Perth, Western Australia. Perth: Zoological Gardens Board. OCLC 222016107.
