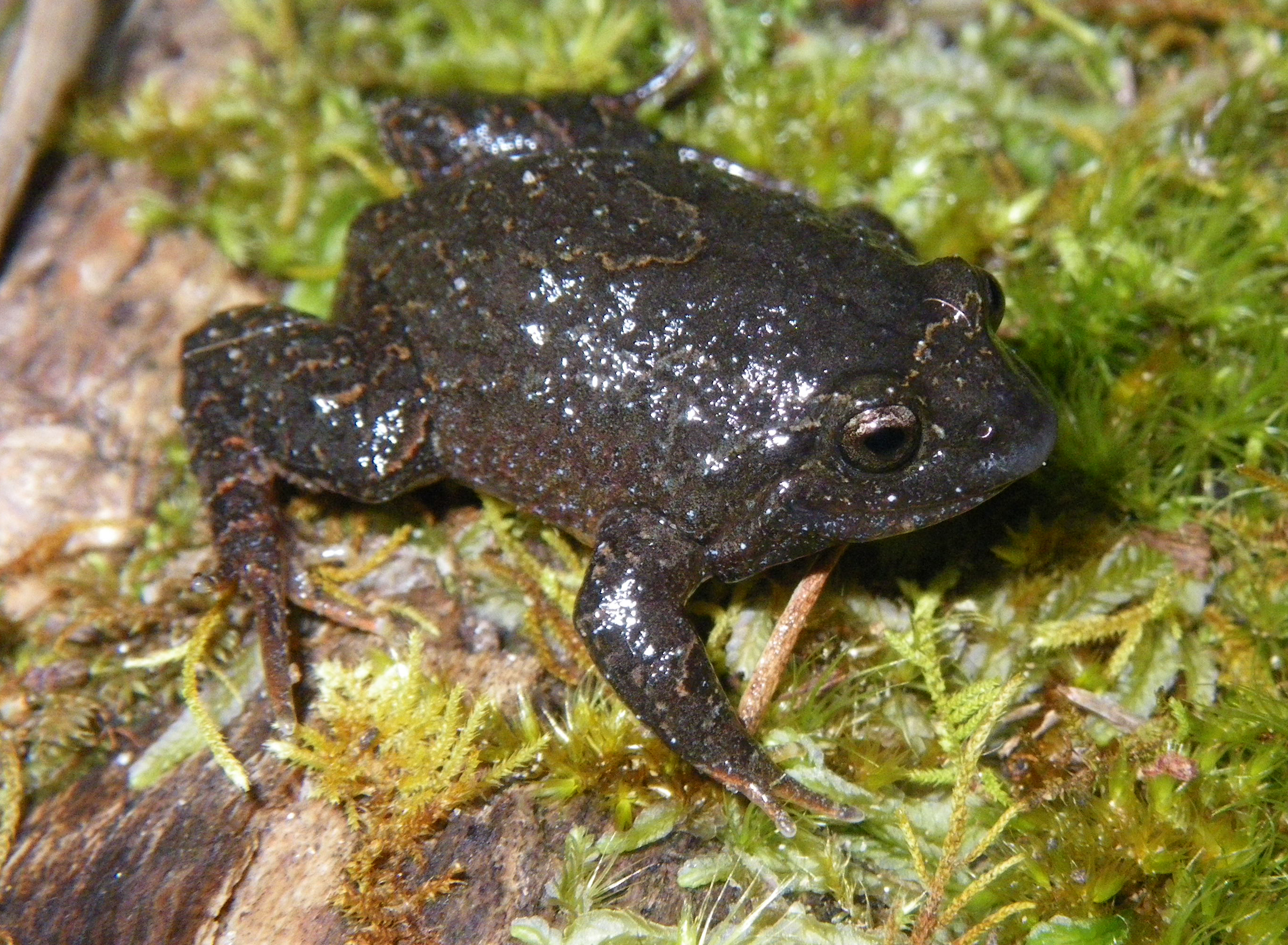

Conservation status
- Least Concern (IUCN 3.1)

Scientific classification
- Kingdom: Animalia
- Phylum: Chordata
- Class: Amphibia
- Order: Anura
- Family: Myobatrachidae
- Genus: Anstisia
- Species: A. rosea

Binomial name
- Anstisia rosea (Harrison, 1927)

Synonyms
- Geocrinia rosea

= Anstisia rosea =

Karri frog

Species of amphibian

Anstisia rosea, the karri or roseate frog is a species in the family, Myobatrachidae. It is endemic to Southwest Australia.

== Taxonomy ==
It was formerly classified in the genus Geocrinia, but was reclassified into the new genus Anstisia in 2022. The Geocrinia roseate frogs were previously placed in the genus Crinia by Harrison. It is most easily distinguished from the 5 congeners of the region (3 Anstisia and 1 Geocrinia species) by the rosy glow of the belly, as indicated in the name.

== Description ==
Anstisia rosea is very similar in appearance to three other Anstisia species; A. alba, A. lutea and A. vitellina. The usually discrete vomerine teeth of the species are evident in this species. Its colouring, largely brown, perhaps mottled, reveals another distinction between the species. The smooth skin of the creature, slightly tubercular on the upper parts, is a rosy pink below. This may also be flecked or mottled. The male has a dark to black throat, and the discrete darker markings are shared by both species. It is generally 25 mm long when adult.

== Habitat and distribution ==
The frog is restricted to the higher rainfall karri forests of the Warren bioregion at the southwest tip of the continent. Streams flow into and by the Warren River, and the permanent moisture found there is the haven and restraint. The high rate of endemism in the result of the lack of motility in the species.

== Reproduction ==
Spring and summer bring drive to form amplexus, and the poorly travelled males will cry for a mate with four beats of the generic 'tk'. Here the frog remains amongst the depressions and recesses, the female leaving her eggs amidst the fallen timber and dense vegetation of the lush forests. The young will emerge from the degrading gelatinous spawn as complete froglets, never swimming in more than the damp floor of their abode.
