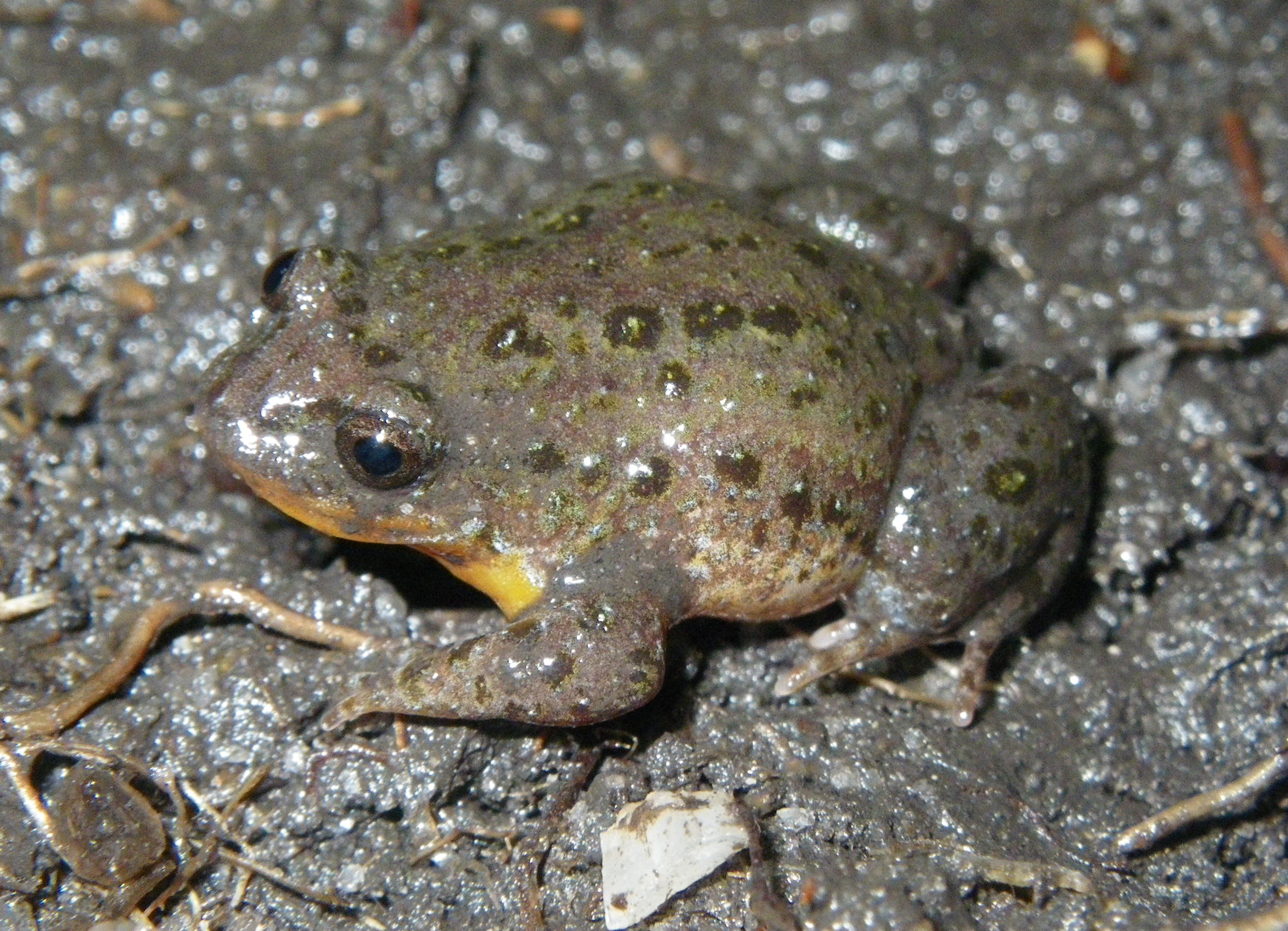
- Anstisia vitellina from Witchcliffe, Western Australia

Scientific classification
- Kingdom: Animalia
- Phylum: Chordata
- Class: Amphibia
- Order: Anura
- Family: Myobatrachidae
- Subfamily: Myobatrachinae
- Genus: Anstisia; Webster and Bool, 2022

Species
- See text

= Anstisia =

Genus of amphibians

Anstisia is a genus of frogs in the family Myobatrachidae. These frogs are endemic to southern Western Australia.

Prior to 2022, these species were classified in the genus Geocrinia. However, a study split four Geocrinia species into their own genus, noting major phylogenetic divergence and striking differences in life history and larval morphology between two groups within the genus. This new genus was named Anstisia in honor of Australian herpetologist Marion Anstis.

The major differences in life history between Anstisia and Geocrinia have long been noted, even before it was split as a distinct genus. Members of Anstisia have entirely terrestrial tadpoles that are nourished by yolk until metamorphosis, while members of Geocrinia have land-developing embryos that develop into aquatic tadpoles.

Anstisia alba is considered critically endangered, due to habitat loss from expansion of the wine industry in Western Australia.

== Species ==
Common name	Binomial name
White-bellied frog	Anstisia alba (Wardell-Johnson & Roberts, 1989)
Walpole's frog	Anstisia lutea (Main, 1963)
Karri frog	Anstisia rosea (Harrison, 1927)
Orange-bellied frog	Anstisia vitellina (Wardell-Johnson & Roberts, 1989)
