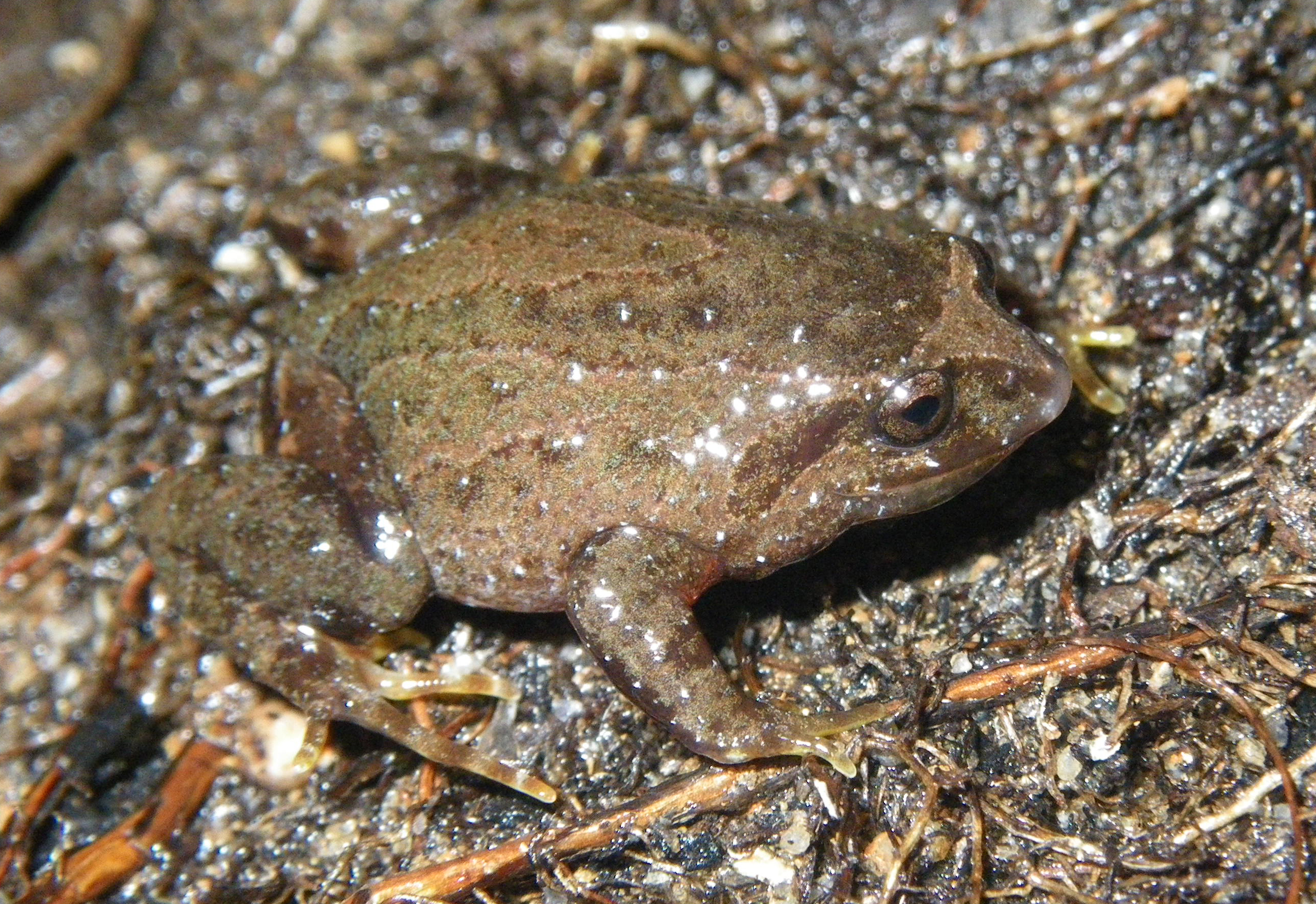

Conservation status
- Least Concern (IUCN 3.1)

Scientific classification
- Kingdom: Animalia
- Phylum: Chordata
- Class: Amphibia
- Order: Anura
- Family: Myobatrachidae
- Genus: Anstisia
- Species: A. lutea

Binomial name
- Anstisia lutea (Main, 1963)

Synonyms
- Geocrinia lutea

= Anstisia lutea =

Nornalup frog

Species of amphibian

Anstisia lutea is a species of frog in the family Myobatrachidae. It is sometimes named for the nearby towns, thus the Nornalup or Walpole frog. It is endemic to Southwest Australia, along with the other members of the genus Anstisia. It was formerly classified in the genus Geocrinia, but was reclassified into the new genus Anstisia in 2022.

It is threatened by habitat loss and an altered fire regime, this and other factors contributed to the 2004 reassessment as Near Threatened (NT). The habit, appearance and ecology is similar to that of the karri frog (A. rosea).
