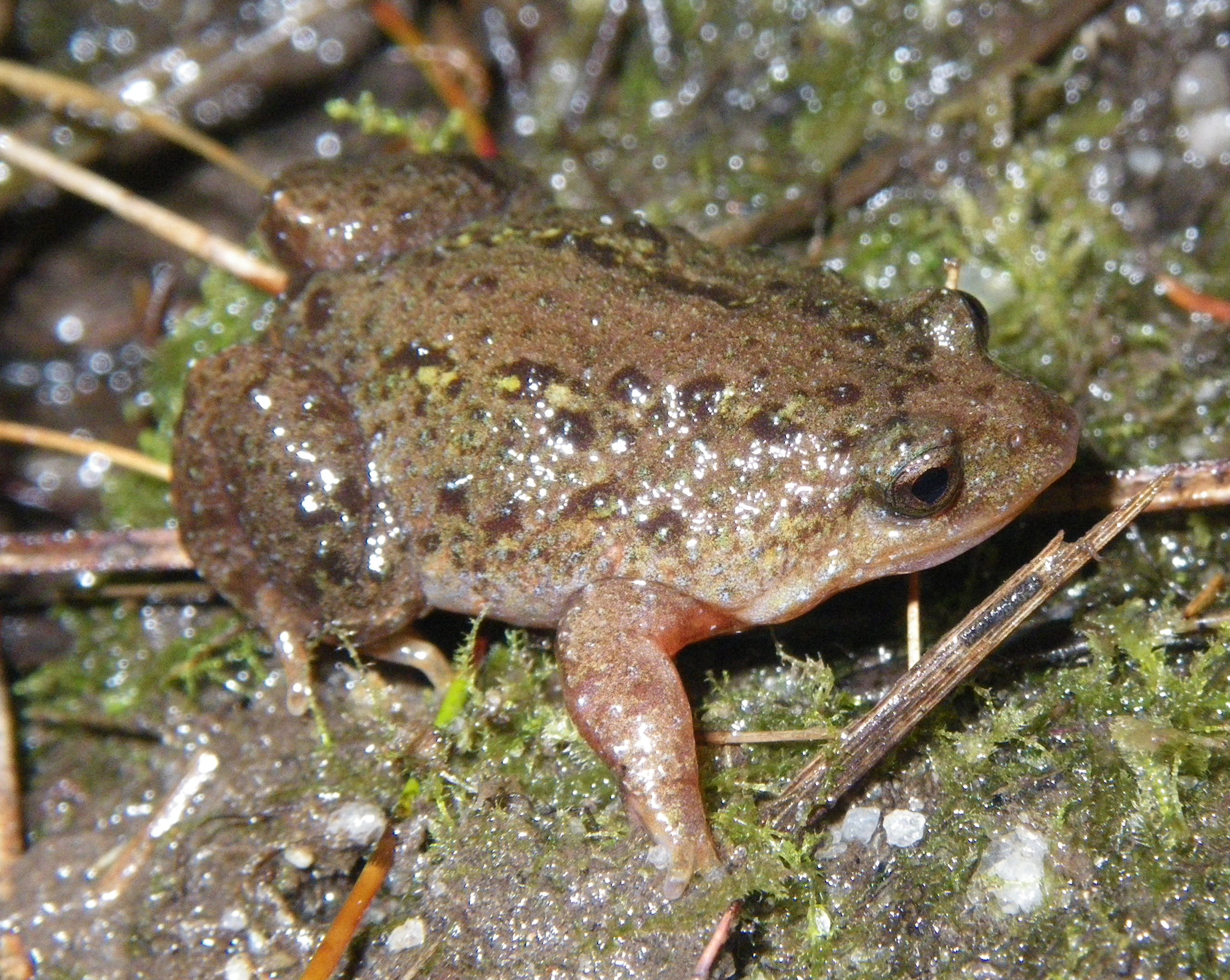

Conservation status
- Critically Endangered (IUCN 3.1)

Scientific classification
- Kingdom: Animalia
- Phylum: Chordata
- Class: Amphibia
- Order: Anura
- Family: Myobatrachidae
- Genus: Anstisia
- Species: A. alba

Binomial name
- Anstisia alba (Wardell-Johnson & Roberts, 1989)

Synonyms
- Geocrinia alba Wardell-Johnson & Roberts, 1989

= Anstisia alba =

White-bellied frog

Species of amphibian

Anstisia alba, commonly known as the white-bellied frog, is a small frog in the family Myobatrachidae. It occupies an area near Margaret River in swampy depressions adjoining creeks. Threats from altered ecology have made this a critically endangered species of south-western Australia.

== Taxonomy ==
It was formerly classified in the genus Geocrinia, but was reclassified into the new genus Anstisia in 2022.

== Description ==
G. alba is very similar in appearance to the orange-bellied frog (A. vitellina); having spots of dark brown on a light brown or grey back and a snout-vent length of 17–24 mm. The underparts, however, are white. It is part of the Geocrinia rosea frog complex.

== Environment and ecology ==
The species occupies an area of 193 ha, across a range of 101 km² around the Witchcliffe-Karridale area of Southwest Australia. This narrow range is confined to swampy areas near creeklines. 56 sites have been found in research conducted by the Sch. Animal Biology (UWA). The species resides and breeds in small depressions under dense vegetation giving a discrete series of 11–18 barely resolvable pulses. Unusually for frog species G. alba has little migratory behaviour and reinvasion of disturbed habitat is not recorded.

== Threatened status ==
Altered ecology and changing land use have led to a status of 'critically endangered' of extinction. Populations occur on 'private property', exposing the habitat to cattle grazing and—since the 1990s—viticulture and eucalypt plantations. Threats such as fire and cattle can degrade vegetation surrounding the frog's habitat; damming and land clearing for viticulture or planting of introduced tree species alters the hydrology. Research has been undertaken by UWA and CALM. Funding has been allocated to provide fencing to land owners and a reserve connecting the Forest Grove and Blackwood River National Parks to assist the protection of the riparian habitat.
