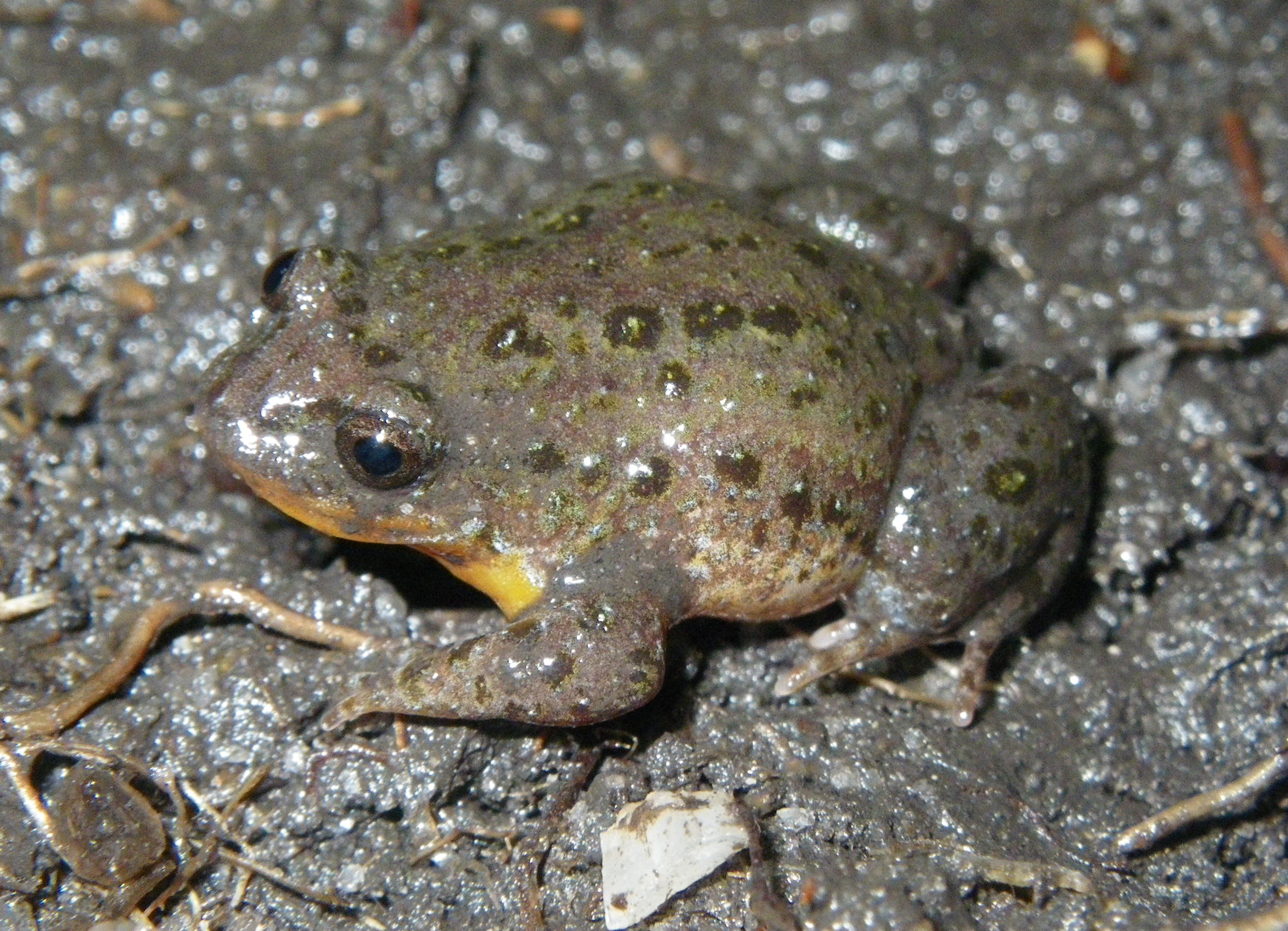

Conservation status
- Vulnerable (IUCN 3.1)

Scientific classification
- Kingdom: Animalia
- Phylum: Chordata
- Class: Amphibia
- Order: Anura
- Family: Myobatrachidae
- Genus: Anstisia
- Species: A. vitellina

Binomial name
- Anstisia vitellina (Wardell-Johnson & Roberts, 1989)

Synonyms
- Geocrinia vitellina Wardell-Johnson & Roberts, 1989

= Anstisia vitellina =

Orange-bellied frog

Species of amphibian

Anstisia vitellina, commonly known as the orange-bellied frog, is a species of frog in the family Myobatrachidae. It is endemic to a 20 hectare area near Margaret River in Southwest Australia. It is vulnerable to extinction due to fire and the destruction of habitat caused by feral pigs.

== Taxonomy ==
It was formerly classified in the genus Geocrinia, but was reclassified into the new genus Anstisia in 2022.

== Description ==
G. vitellina is very similar in appearance to the white-bellied frog (A. alba); having spots of dark brown on a light brown or grey back, with has a snout–vent length of 17–24 mm. The underparts, however, are paler and vivid orange in the front.

== Environment and ecology ==
The species occupies an area of 20 ha, the smallest of any Australian mainland vertebrate, across a range of 6.3 km^{2} around Witchcliffe. This narrow range is confined to swampy areas near creeklines. Six creeks on the Blackwood River, Western Australia have been found to provide appropriate habitat.

Populations are isolated due to breeding behaviour and a small individual range—unusual for frog species. A call is given in spring and early summer with a series of 9–15 pulses only just discernible. Eggs are laid in depressions, surrounded by a jelly mass. Without feeding or swimming, the tadpoles progress to an adult stage.

== Threatened status ==
The small range of this species has made it vulnerable to threats such as fire and 'wild pigs', water solutionism through agricultural runoff, and changes to the hydrology of the riparian habitat through land-use.
