= Ellis Stanley Joseph =

American collector and wildlife trader (1872–1938)

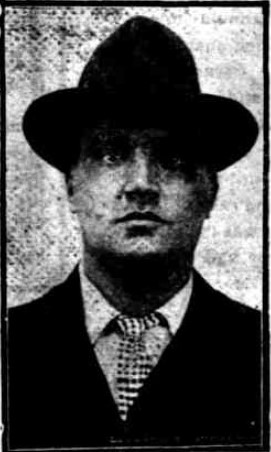
- Born: Bombay, India
- Died: 16 September 1938 (aged 65–66); Bronx, New York, United States
- Occupations: Wildlife collector and trader
- Years active: 1887-1933
- Height: 6 ft 6 in (198 cm)

Ellis Stanley Joseph (also known as Ellis Joseph or Ellis S. Joseph) was a collector and trader in wildlife in the early part of the 20th century. An animal trainer of remarkable ability, he also trained some of his captive wildlife to perform in public.

== Biography ==
Much of what is known of Ellis Joseph's childhood and early adult years comes from three lengthy interviews that he gave to newspapers—the Barrier Miner in April 1910, the Sunday Times (Perth) in July 1912, and the Sun (Sydney) in September 1912.

In the interview for The Barrier Miner in April 1910, Ellis Joseph said that he was born in Bombay (now Mumbai), India to Welsh parents of Jewish religion. Joseph is a Jewish surname, although not exclusively so and, amongst others, it is a Welsh name. He was recognised as being Jewish in the U.S.A. Despite Joseph's own statement on his Welsh ethnicity, it is very likely that he actually was of Indian-Jewish origin, but hid that Indian origin due to the then prevailing racial policies in Australia. Evidence supporting that hypothesis is that his surname 'Joseph' was common in some Indian communities (particularly the Baghdadi Sephardic Jewish community, but also the Syriac Christians); he was born at Bombay in India (a city with a significant local Jewish population and history); he was described as having "dark-tanned skin", and his physical appearance in newspaper photographs. By the time that Ellis Joseph was born, many Baghdadi Jews were engaged in colonial commerce, were western-educated, and used English first names or English variants of Jewish first names. 'Ellis' may have been an anglicized version of Elias / Elijah, derived from the Hebrew name Eliyahu; Elis is its Welsh form.

Ellis Joseph said that the family moved to San Francisco in the United States when he was nine months old. In 1912, he said that he had lived near Van Ness Avenue and attended the Geary-street Public School. An obituary—published in the U.S. after his death in 1938—stated that he was educated at an English school in Shanghai. However, Ellis Joseph himself stated that he had an American upbringing and schooling, and that seems far more consistent with his adult personality and that, in later life, he chose to live in the United States.

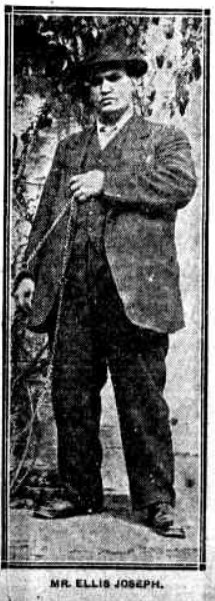
Ellis Joseph - Photograph from the Sun (Sydney), 30 September 1912.

Joseph gave this account of how he left home in the 1912 newspaper interview.

It was intended that I should be a doctor, but parents propose and boys dispose. I had no liking for carving human animals; I wanted to get out amongst the beasts and birds. It was the call of the wild, I suppose.

So one day when I was 15 and had two dollars I let out from as good a home as there was around Los Angeles. I spent one dollar on traps and half a dollar on birdlime, and I had half a dollar left as capital. Then I worked through to 'Frisco' and when I realised, I had 50 dollars. That is how fate decides.

Well, I was away four years, and my people found I was at Seattle, and they sent my brother up to capture me, which he did, and I had to put in another year at school. But it was no use. You know, some men are just like lichens they stick on one bit of rock; others are like seed that is blown about the world, and perhaps never stay long enough anywhere to germinate.

This 1912 account is similar to an earlier one given in 1910.

In adulthood, Ellis Joseph was a physically large man—six feet six inches (1.98 m) tall and 21 stone (294 lb or 134 kg) in weight—who was renowned for his seemingly boundless energy. For most of his adult life, he made his living by the import, export and sale of living creatures, capturing many of them himself on expeditions.

There is no doubt of his genuine enthusiasm for wildlife of all kinds. In an interview he stated, reportedly with a sigh, "If I were a wealthy man, I'd have people collecting animals, for my zoo, instead of me collecting for other people's zoos." He had a real gift for relating to and training animals but he was unsentimental about selling even pet animals, and he made large sums of money by trading in wildlife. By the standards of today, his methods of capturing and handling of living creatures would be seen as causing unacceptable suffering, too high an environmental impact, and an excessive death rate.

From some time prior to 1901 up to 1923, he lived in Australia, when not travelling which he frequently did. His travel during these years took him to North America, South America, India, West Africa, and South Africa. From November 1918 to 1926, Joseph owned a 17-acre estate called 'Highfield Hall', which was located in what was then part of Granville but is now within the suburb of Guildford in Sydney. As well as being Joseph's home, 'Highfield Hall' became both a private zoo and a temporary home for animals in transit to or from other countries.

No mention has been found of Joseph ever marrying. He returned to the United States in 1923. He suffered bad health in his final years and died on 16 September 1938, of a heart attack aged 66 years old, at his home at 179 Mosholu Parkway, the Bronx.

== Wildlife trading ==
=== Early years ===
At the age of 13, Joseph discovered that there was money to be made in trading birds. While on a holiday trip with his father to Panama, he bought some green parrots at Central American ports and sold these at a profit when he returned to San Francisco. He left home at 15 and made his living trapping and selling birds on the US West Coast, also making a trip to Corinto, in Nicaragua to obtain birds. After a brief interlude during which he was returned to his home and to school, he once again left home at 17 years of age and traded—by his own account—birds from Mexico to Seattle and Tacoma.

It seems that it was trading in birds from the Americas that brought him to Australia but, during an interview in 1910, he said that he also had held other jobs during those early years, including as a fireman in Melbourne (1901) and a railway yard foreman in Auckland, New Zealand. Once familiar with his new environment, he began exporting Australian birds to Europe.

By 1904, Ellis Joseph appears to have based himself in the Western Australian Goldfields Region. In December 1904, he was in Boulder near Kalgoorlie in Western Australia selling caged birds, when one cage containing two 'Californian parakeets' was stolen from him. In September 1906, 'Ellis Josephs' was operating 'a newly-opened bird shop' in Maritana Street Kalgoorlie, was charged with 'cruelly treating a large number of birds by over-crowding them into cages', and fined £1 with 2s costs. In his defence, he stated that the birds had been shipped from Durban in the same cages, and had been inspected upon arrival in port by the 'Chief Stock Inspector and the manager of the Zoological Gardens'. Soon afterwards Ellis Joseph decided to leave Western Australia. In an advertisement for his Kalgoorlie bird shop on 14 September 1906, he announced that "I am leaving for the Eastern States" (of Australia). Hundreds of birds and other items were sold at auction in Perth on 25 September 1906 in preparation for his move.

It is likely that, while in Western Australia, Ellis Joseph had made the acquaintance of Ernest Albert Le Souef, first director of the Perth Zoo from 1898 to 1935. He then began making larger scale expeditions and trading in larger animals.

=== Early expeditions to capture wildlife and trained animal exhibits ===
Ellis Joseph's first venture into the 'big game' animal market was in India, as he stated in a lengthy interview as reported by the Barrier Miner newspaper in April 1910,

"I embarked on the British India liner Mombassa at London for East India, and landed at Bombay. From there I travelled on to Poona, and thence onward to Surat. On arrival at Surat I bought two tigers, and caught two leopards, three spotted deer, and a large number of birds, including vultures. These I took to Europe, and eventually disposed of the lot at Marseilles."

By 1908, his attention turned to Africa, and he stated in the Barrier Miner interview that he had worked there alongside a big game hunter of the time.

"My next journey was to Africa. I landed at Durban, and went to Bulawayo in company with a man named Van Ruyen, who at the present time is the greatest hunter in Africa, next to Sleus, the man who accompanied ex-president Roosevelt on his hunting tour. At Bulawayo we captured four lions, a number of elands, antelopes, water and spring bocks, sable antetopes, crown cranes, secretary birds, and a large number of other species. These were also taken to Europe, and I disposed of the lot to Carl Hagenback [sic], the great Hamburg animal trainer and dealer."

Joseph's companion on this expedition—the hunter reported as 'Van Ruyen'—almost certainly, was Cornelius van Rooyen (1860-1915), big game hunter and first breeder of the Rhodesian Ridgeback (previously known as 'Van Rooyen's lion dog'). The hunter reported as 'Sleus' is almost certainly the famous big game hunter, Frederick Selous (1851-1917), who was a friend of Cornelius van Rooyen, and who accompanied Theodore Roosevelt on the Smithsonian–Roosevelt African Expedition in 1909.

In April 1908, about 80-miles away from Bulawayo, Joseph was injured on the forearm by a lioness that he had captured during this expedition.

It seems that, between his 1908 and 1911-1912 expeditions outside Australia, Joseph made a living exhibiting trained chimpanzees—ones he captured in Ashanti (now Ghana)—while travelling in Australia and, very likely, capturing or buying Australian animals and birds for export as he went along.

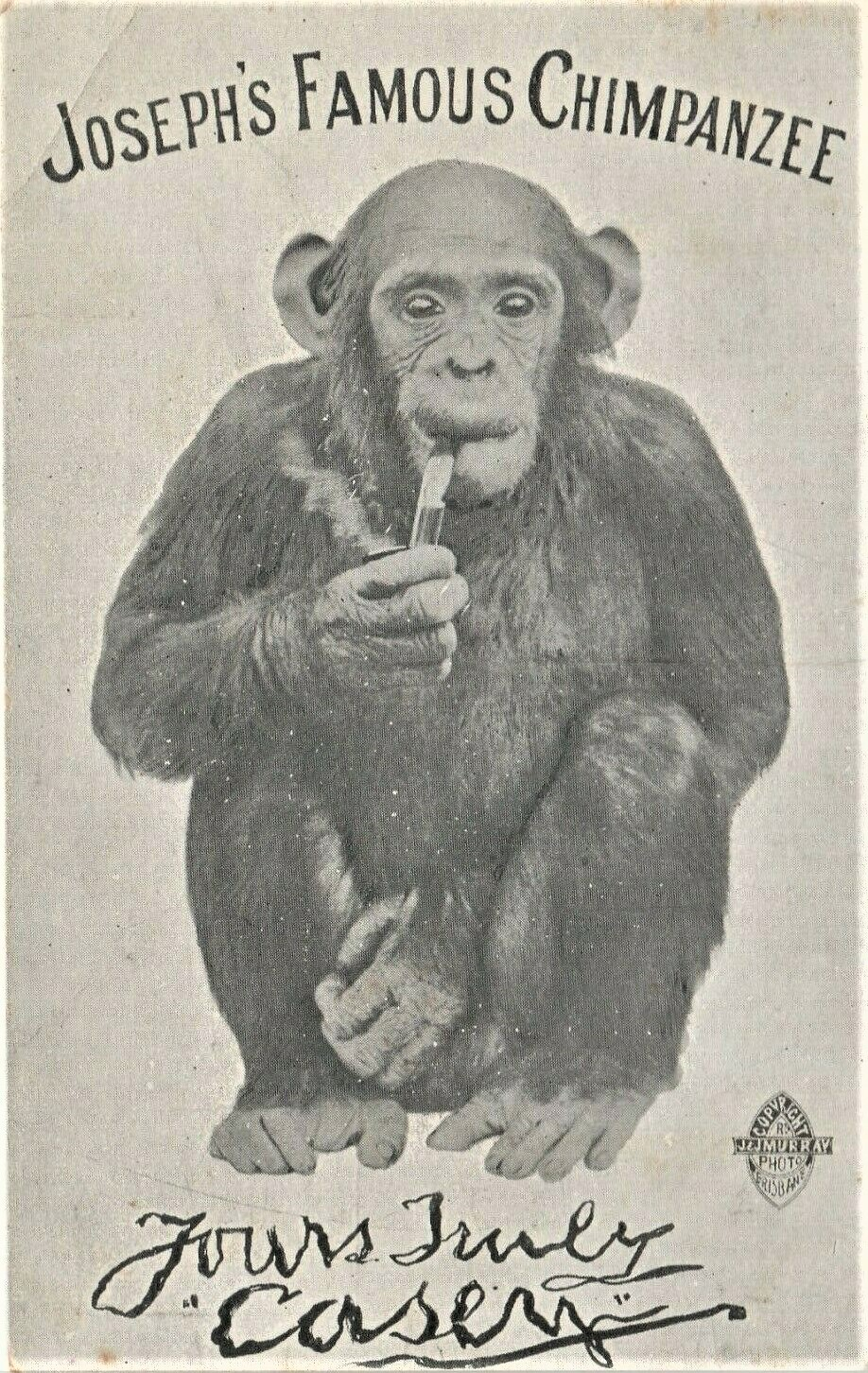
'Casey', c.1910, and his autograph.

In May 1909, Ellis Joseph was in Brisbane exhibiting two chimpanzees that had been trained to perform, but when he gave his long interview to the Barrier Miner in April 1910, was at Broken Hill with just one called 'Casey'. The second chimpanzee 'Baldy' had died in Queensland, in May 1909, of pneumonia, and its body had been sold by Joseph to a Brisbane museum for use as an exhibit. A third chimp, 'Joseph' (or 'Joe'), had died in Melbourne, of marasmus—suggesting loss of appetite and a miserable end—before 'Baldy' had died, and his body had been turned into an exhibit at the museum in Melbourne. In June 1909, 'Casey' was performing in Mackay and Charters Towers, before heading to Townsville and Cairns, keeping to the warmer parts of Queensland, during the winter of that year, probably with Casey's health in mind.

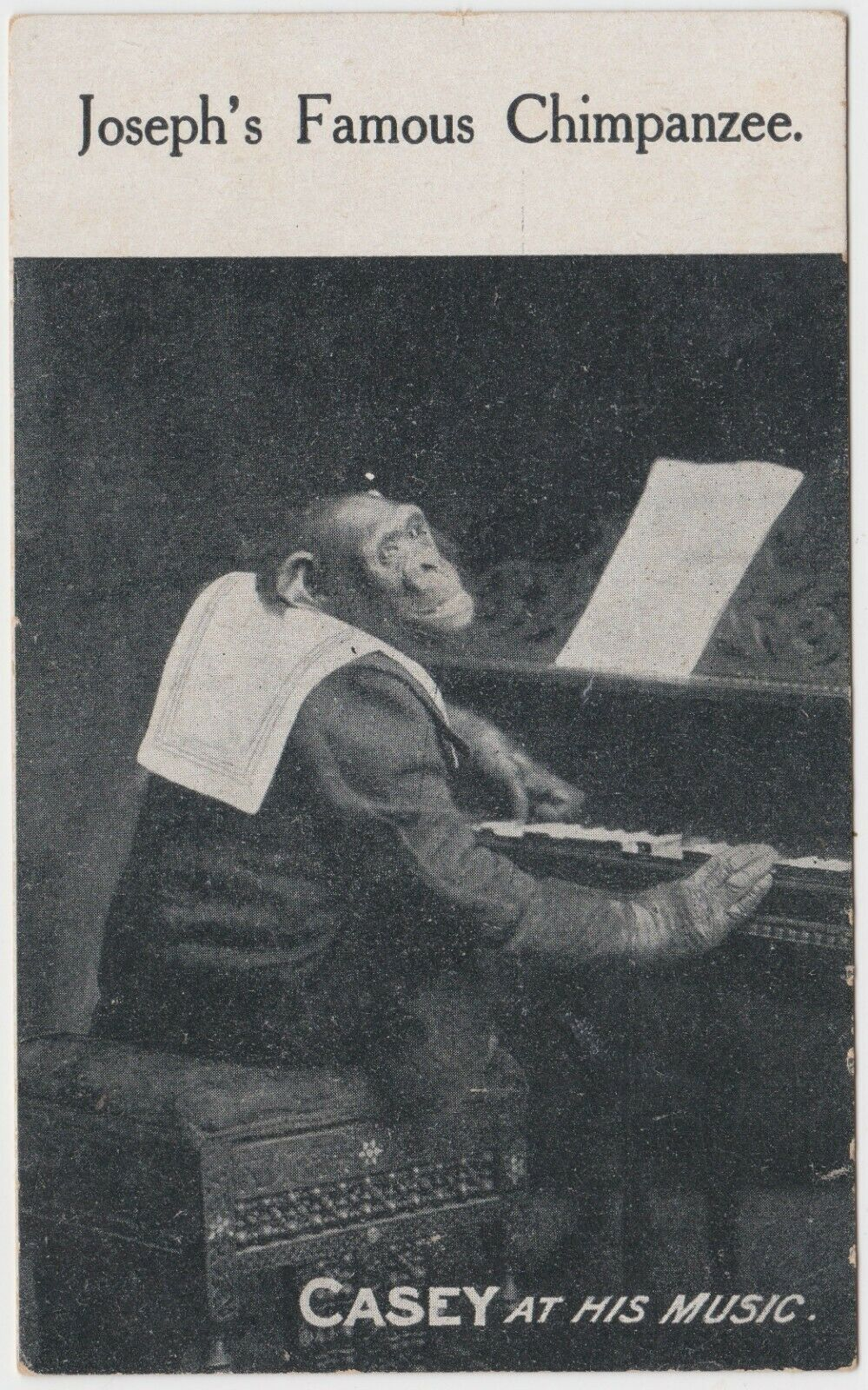
'Casey at his music' c.1910

In May 1910, 'Casey' was performing in Broken Hill, where it was reported that his "utterly human behaviour has astounded the city", and later that month in Adelaide. In August of the same year, Casey performed in Kalgoorlie, and in November in Hobart. 'Casey' had been trained in various human-like behaviours and, as well as performing acrobatic displays, would shake hands with onlookers, drink milk from a glass, use a pencil to scrawl an autograph on paper, wind a watch, smoke a cigarette or pipe, play music including on the mouth organ, sweep with a broom, and "nurse any babies handed to him with wonderful care".

The range of trained behaviours demonstrated Joseph's considerable skill and achievement as an animal trainer, and hints at a level of attachment between 'Casey' and his owner. However, Joseph was not above putting a monetary value upon 'Casey'; he was first and foremost an animal trader. In a newspaper interview, in May 1910, he explained that, before he could obtain two hippos for Melbourne Zoo, he would need to sell 'Casey'. He apparently did sell 'Casey' to Thomas Fox. ('Casey' escaped in December 1914 and was shot in the foot by police in Marrickville, Sydney, after allegedly frightening a woman to death. Fox lost an eye in the same incident and, after being fined £2 and paying £300 in compensation to the dead woman's estate, he took 'Casey' to the U.S.A. Casey died at Tampa, Florida in January 1917.)

During the long interview of April 1910, Ellis Joseph stated that he had supplied animals to the Adelaide, Melbourne, Perth, and Sydney Zoos, zoos in Europe and America, and the Pretoria Zoo in South Africa. He also stated that he had made an expedition to Argentina to capture wildlife including pumas, as well as several expeditions to Africa.

By late 1911, he was making another expedition to West Africa to collect specimens, some of which he sold to the Perth Zoo upon his return in 1912, and was shipping significant numbers of birds and animals.

Once the connection with zoos had been made, Joseph had customers ready to take creatures he captured and his reputation as a major dealer in wildlife grew. He also sold animals to private wildlife collectors, among others Walter Rothschild, who himself had zoological training and was renowned for his carriage drawn by four zebra.

By 1913, Eliis Joseph was in Sydney and had a 'vivariaum' at Moore Park, the then location of the Zoological Gardens. In that year, he met Harry Burrell and began to take a keen interest in Burrell's attempts to exhibit platypuses at zoos.

The outbreak of World War I and Germany's subsequent loss of her overseas colonies, together with the untimely death of Carl Hagenbeck in 1913, created an opportunity for Joseph, as Germany's hitherto dominant position in the trading of animals for zoos became vacant.

=== Capturing larger animals ===
Joseph was interested mainly in capturing live animals for profit, not in hunting big game or collecting dead specimens for museums. But in trying to capture young animals alive, the deaths of older wild animals and animals used as bait did occur. Captured animals also often died; getting the captured animals to eat was seen by Joseph as a major challenge. In the April 1910 interview, he outlined the problem with larger animals such as chimpanzees, as follows.

"The next thing is to get them to eat after they are placed in captivity. You certainly, do succeed at times, but in most cases the animals sulk or die. The same trouble is experienced with the gorilla, a full size specimen of which has not been possible to rear. Even after years of captivity the gorilla becomes savage, sulks, and dies."

In the April 1910 interview, he described three of the methods he used to capture African animals.

"The best and most effective method I have found to be is the building of a trap, something like a large room, with a picket partition. This would have a door in the front, which would be self-acting, and close down by means of a spring, being released by the weight and vibration caused by the rustling movement of the beast. In this cage or room would be placed a donkey, which is used as a bait. Lions are fond of donkey flesh, and prefer it to the flesh of horses or bullocks."

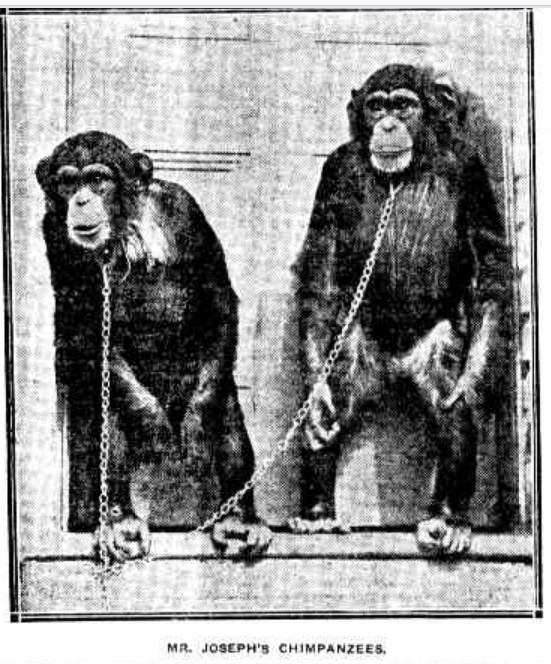
Ellis Joseph's chimpanzees, presumably captured during his 1911-1912 expedition - Photograph from Sun (Sydney), 30 Sept 1912.

"The best time to catch the hippopotamus is on moonlight nights and in the dry season. As is well known, the hippo, is an amphibious animal, and when the moon is clear and bright it comes out of the creeks to graze. The hunter has then to discover the favorite spot or breeding places of the beast, and, having done that, build a barricade there. The next move is to get at a point about a mile away, and erect another barricade, and the hippo is thus enclosed in a kind of pound. The express rifle is next brought into use to shoot the old hippos, and the securing of the young animals is then a comparatively easy matter. The full-grown ones are too ferocious and too weighty to handle, weighing from two to four tons each."

"Where the casava grows is to be found a creeper called by the natives ti-ti. The stem of this creeper is about the thickness of an ordinary penholder with the strength and pliability of wire. Of this creeper the chimpanzee takes no notice, and thus an almost natural trap is made for him. The natives plait the stems of the ti-ti and make snares. Having completed the snares, 'boys' are placed a few hundred yards away with nets and lassoos. In due time the 'chimp.' comes along and digs for the [casava] root. lt gets caught in the snare, and begins to make a noise. Action has to be at once taken to secure the animal, otherwise it will either liberate itself or its fellow 'chimps.' will do so. The lassoo, which is a double-ended one, is thrown, the chimpanzee is caught in the centre of it, and eventually it is placed safely in a box waiting for its reception, where it is freed."

In an interview with The Sun in September 1912, he disclosed a fourth method.

"In many cases a favorite watering place of the animals was charged with bromide or cyanide of potassium, which had the effect of stupefying the beasts. Then, of course, they were easy to handle and stored away."

By the standards of today, these methods cause unacceptable suffering, too high an environmental impact, and an excessive death rate.

=== Association with Le Souef family and zoos ===
Joseph formed an association with three Australian zoo directors, the brothers Ernest Albert Le Souef (first director of the Perth Zoo from 1898 to 1935), Albert Sherbourne Le Souef (secretary of the Zoological Gardens at Moore Park, Sydney, up to 1916 and then first director of Taronga Park Zoo, from 1916 to 1939) and William Henry Dudley Le Souef (an ornithologist and second director of Melbourne Zoo from 1902 to 1923). Their father was Albert Alexander Cochrane Le Souef, who until his death in 1902 was—like his sons—a zoologist and was involved in the establishment of the Perth Zoo and the Melbourne Zoo, of which he was its first director.

Some saw Ellis Joseph's association with the Le Souef family and the Australian zoos as both unduly advantaging Ellis Joseph over other exporters of Australian wildlife and allowing the zoos themselves to profit, from a large-scale export of Australian animals and birds, against the intent of statutes governing such exports.

Leading the demands for greater transparency were the Daily Telegraph and the Wild Life Preservation Society. In 1922, as a result of their efforts, it became known publicly that Ellis Joseph had earlier entered into an exclusive arrangement for a period of five-years, under which he was to receive a half-share of profits from sales (net of transport and other costs) but was guaranteed a minimum of £1000 per annum. Around this time, Ellis Joseph had a falling out with the Le Soueth brothers, losing access to their influence.

=== Deliveries to Australian zoos ===
The scale of Ellis Joseph's operations is apparent from the large shipments he made to Australia during the period from 1912 to 1921. Some of the animals were sold to Australian zoos and some—after November 1918—would be kept at Joseph's estate "Highfield Hall" unless sold or while awaiting trans-shipment to zoos in the U.S.A or other countries.

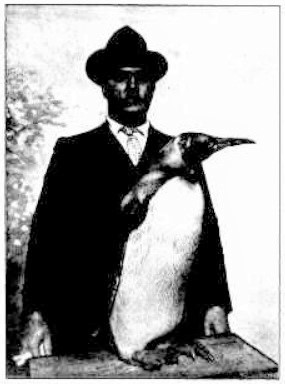
Ellis Joseph with king penguin (from Western Mail (Perth), 3 August 1912)

==== 1912 shipment ====
By November 1911, Eliis Joseph was in West Africa. He advised from Sierra Leone that he was going to leave 'Koko Beach' in the south of Nigeria in search of more animals, having already captured some at that time.

Ellis Joseph arrived in Perth on 22 June 1912 with a collection of animals mainly from West Africa. He had failed to obtain a rhinoceros for the Perth Zoo. He described what he had found as follows:

This trip I captured 73 monkeys of various kinds, 16 deer, chimpanzees, eagles, ostriches, a mermaid, a servalina, two bush pigs, 964 grey parrots, and those other things I mentioned previously. But here is the pride of the lot, a king penguin, from Kerguelen, on the way to the South Pole.

What was reported as a 'mermaid' was an African manatee that later died while being transported to England. Several of the animals in this 1912 shipment were purchased by Perth Zoo.

Ellis Joseph was selling grey parrots from the 1912 shipment to the public, advertising in Perth and Kalgoorlie. In 1913, he was exporting birds to Vancouver.

==== 1914 shipments ====
In March 1914, Ellis Joseph brought a cargo of animals to Sydney on the RMS Niagara from Vancouver, Canada. The shipment was reported as follows

"Bulking largest are two magnificent bull bison, captured in Montana; and next in size are two elk, the latter pair and some of the other animals being for the Sydney Zoological Gardens."

"The other inhabitants of this floating menagerie ...... are 14 bears black, brown, and cinnamon - several deer, eight peccary (Mexican wild boar), five coyotes (prairie wolves), three beavers, several minx, a number of squirrels, raccoons, porcupines, lynx, four badgers, and a leopard cat. Among the birds are four American baldheaded eagles, Canadian "honker" goose, blue jays, snow birds, and variegated thrushes. There are also a number of snakes. The whole collection is native of either the States or Canada, and took over four months to get together. They are destined for various Zoological Gardens."

In March 1914, Joseph sold one of the bull bison and some of the other animals to the Adelaide Zoo. The bison had been in a crate, in which it could not turn, for four months and so had marks on its skin.

In late December 1914, Ellis Joseph had another cargo of animals on board ss Nordic en route from Durban to the eastern states of Australia. There was a rhinoceros on board and Ellis stated that this was only the fourth one to be captured alive, There were also two African elephants and many other animals on board. The inventory was described as follows.

"a brown hyena, two lions, four leopards, two zebras, two South American llamas, Moufflons, Barbary sheep, blesbok, springbok, ducker bok, impalla, and sable antelopes, jackals, lemurs, two South African elephants, a Livingstone eland, Patagonian hares, a rhinoceros, 40 apes and baboons of different kinds, an Aldebarra tortoise from the Seychelles Islands, pythons and birds of all descriptions."

Some of these animals were destined for the Melbourne Zoo.

In August 1915, Ellis Joseph assisted a fundraising day in Sydney by providing the use of one of the African elephants, a four to five year old 'baby' elephant called 'African Daisy'. Joseph said that he had captured the elephant in Southern Rhodesia in October 1914 and had trained it for a fortnight for the fundraising activity. During the fundraising, the baby elephant was ridden by a little girl. It was reported that the zoos in Australia could not pay him enough for this 'baby' elephant, and that Joseph sent it to Honolulu.

==== 1916 shipment ====
In 1916, Eliis Joseph brought three young polar bears—one male and two female—from New York for the Taronga Park Zoo in Sydney. The cost was £450. By 1919, the zoo was planning to attempt to breed bear cubs from these bears.

The content of the shipment was reported as follows.

"The most interesting animal of the consignment is a monster grizzly bear, which was captured after a hard fight in his Rocky Mountain home. This animal is destined for the new bear pit at Taronga Park. The other animals include three polar bears, two grizzly bears, a todiac [sic] bear, two Mongolian wild horses, monkeys, beavers, raccoons, 14 elks, and black and cinnamon bears. There are also a number of parrots, buzzards, Virginian wild turkeys; white cross pigeons, alligators, and various varieties of snakes."

One of the snakes was a boa-constrictor. Two elks and a bison died during the voyage.

Ellis Joseph hoped to dispose of the wildlife to the Taronga Park Zoo in Sydney and to the Adelaide Zoo.

==== 1921 shipment ====
In 1921, Ellis Joseph was a passenger on the first part of the last voyage of the SS Canastota. After the ship left New York and passed through the Panama Canal, it called first at Suva, Fiji, where numerous birds, animals and reptiles were transferred to the A.U.S.N. Co. steamer Levuka (bound for Sydney), along with Ellis Joseph, who had been on the ship as a passenger. The transfer between ships was made so as to reduce the time it would take to deliver the live cargo to Sydney, as Canastota was to call at several ports prior to arriving in Sydney.

The wildlife in the shipment were as follows.

"8 bears (polar and grizzly), 3 buffaloes, 14 racoons, 2 wolves, 8 foxes, 50 monkeys,. 2 mountain lions, 5 skunks, 100 snakes, 100 parrots, 100 finches, 2 llamas, 20 white swans, 7 possums, 40 alligators, 21 tortoises,.2 gilla monsters, 1 woolley monkey".

A hyena and a llama died during the voyage.

On 18 April 1921, Mr. Joseph and his menagerie reached Sydney safely. The cargo of creatures was divided between Taronga Park Zoo in Sydney and Melbourne Zoo.

On Anzac Day (25 April) 1921, he was reunited - in front of a hundred or so onlookers - with his former pet chipmazee 'Casey', whom he had sold to the Taronga Park Zoo before leaving for America in 1920. (This chimpanzee was the second 'Casey', not the one with whom he had travelled Australia in 1909-1910.) In Casey's excitement to see him again—or so it was reported at the time—'Casey' embraced Joseph but, in doing so, delivered a bite to Joseph's jaw that resulted in a large wound to his cheek and another below his chin. Joseph, who had one arm in a sling at the time, was rescued by a zoo keeper and sent to hospital for treatment. The second 'Casey' lived at the zoo, until his death in January 1936.

=== Deliveries to American zoos ===
==== 1916 & 1917 shipments (thylacine or 'Tasmanian tiger', elephant & 'Hawaiian wallabies') ====
Thylacines at Hobart Zoo - 1911, 1928 and 1933 (compilation of silent films).

Joseph played a small part in hastening the extinction of the thylacine or 'Tasmanian tiger', by providing two of the animals to the Bronx Zoo, in New York in 1916 and 1917. The first animal died after only seven days at the zoo, while the second lived until September 1919.

On a visit to the Bronx Zoo, the director of the Melbourne Zoo, Mr. Le Souef, said upon seeing the last animal, "I advise you to take excellent care of that specimen; for when it is gone, you never will get another. The species soon will be extinct". The last known thylacine died at the Beaumaris Zoo in Hobart in 1936.

In 1916, Joseph delivered a young African elephant to Honolulu's Kapiolani Park Zoo. Named 'Miss Daisy'—almost certainly the same elephant as 'African Daisy' who was used for fundraising in Sydney in 1915—she was at the zoo until March 1933, when she went on a rampage. She killed her keeper George Conradt, got loose, and was then shot dead.

Two brush-tailed rock wallabies sold in 1916 by Ellis Joseph to Richard Henderson Trent, for his private zoo, are believed to be the ancestors of the wild population of wallabies in the Kalihi Valley on the Hawaiian island of O'ahu.

==== 1920 shipment ====
Using his estate 'Highfield Hall' to accommodate the creatures, Joseph accumulated a consignment of over 4,000 Australian birds, animals and reptiles for the New York Zoo. This live cargo was shipped from Sydney on the steamer Bellbuckle, which arrived in New York on 29 October 1920. Mr. Joseph accompanied his live cargo as a passenger. (Prior to leaving Sydney, in August 1920, he sold his pet chimpanzee—the second one that he owned called 'Casey'—to the Taronga Park Zoo.)

The shipment included a lung-fish, from the Burnett River in Queensland, for the New York Zoo. This was unusual for Ellis Joseph, who was interested in all animals but did "not deal in fishes, except on his breakfast plate".

Some of the creatures were sent to the US under an agreement between American zoos and Australian zoos, to cooperate by providing specimens endemic to each country, and some belonged to Mr. Joseph himself. The exact role of Ellis Joseph was controversial; he appeared to be both a wildlife dealer and simultaneously acting as an 'agent' for the Australian zoos.

While in New York, Joseph assembled a shipment of creatures destined for Australian zoos. He left New York, together with his new live cargo, aboard the ss Canastota on 6 March 1921.

==== Koala or 'koala bear' ====
Speaking in April 1921, about Ellis Joseph, the master of the ss Canastota (Captain Andrew J. Lockie) said in a newspaper interview.:

I remember one cute little bear he sent to New York. That poor little bear was landed there, but there were no gum leaves, for him to eat. None could be found in the city, and efforts were made to get some, but the dear little thing would not eat anything else, and he fretted and died after a week.

==== Platypus (1922) ====
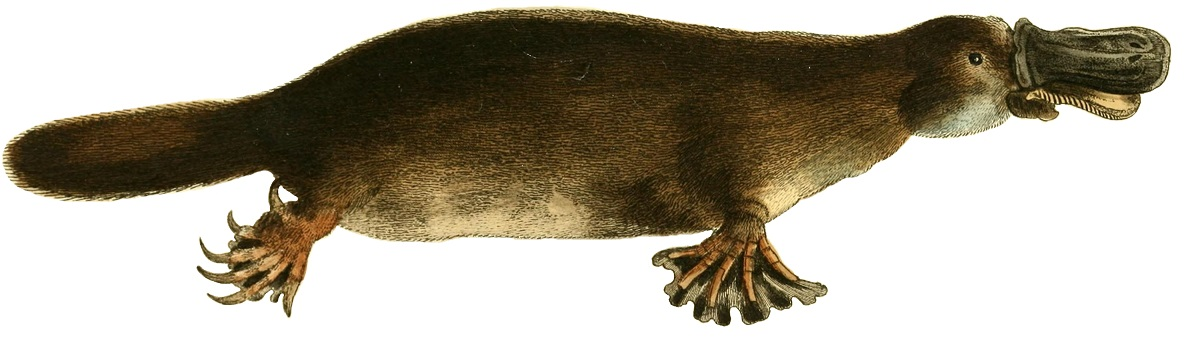
Platypus

With the assistance of the Australian naturalist and expert on monotremes, Henry Burrell, Ellis Joseph took the first live platypus to be seen outside Australia to the United States in 1922.

Five platypuses were shipped from Sydney on 12 May 1922 to San Francisco, from where they were sent by train to New York, at all times accompanied by Mr. Joseph. Ellis Joseph had been assisted by his local member of the NSW Parliament, Mr A.K. Bowden, MLA, to obtain an export permit for the platypuses.

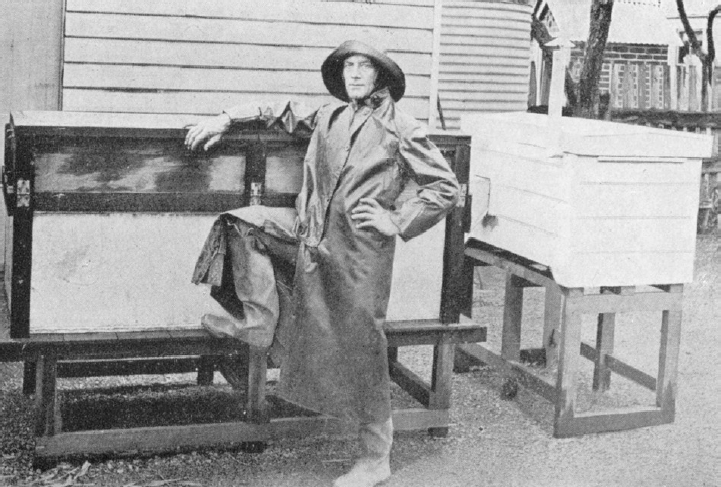
Henry Burrell with his 'portable platypusary'.

The animals were transported in an enclosure designed by Burrell—with some input from Joseph—that was known as a 'portable platypusary'. It consisted of five compartments leading from the water to the sand, and in each of the internal walls there was a narrow, rubber-lined doorway. Joseph explained the secret of the 'portable platypusary', in an interview:

It's quite simple. When the platypus wants to change from water to sand, he has to crawl through those rubber-Iined doors. This gradually drains the moisture from its fur, and by the time it reaches the sand it is dry. It seems a curious notion, but it's the whole secret. Before I put those doors in the platypus used always to get pneumonia through never being able to get properly dry whilst In the tank.

Despite the special enclosure and the great care taken, after the long journey of over fifty days, only one platypus was alive and it survived at the New York Zoological Park for only seven weeks. Burrell wrote later, "I am glad to say that good fortune eventually favored me, since on June 30, 1922, I landed in San Francisco with the first living platypus ever brought to America." After staying in San Francisco to secure a supply of fresh worms to feet the platypus ("and this I can assure the reader was not an easy matter"), he and the platypus took a lengthy trip by train to New York, arriving finally on July 14, 1922, to ensure "that the New York Zoological Park had the honour of being the first institution to place before its visitors a living platypus.... The animal lived at the Park for 49 days."

Ellis Joseph wrote about the events of the long journey and his efforts—from 1916 onward—to export a platypus, in an article for Bulletin of the New York Zoological Society that was quoted in The Journal (Adelaide) of 7 April 1923. The export of a live platypus was the pinnacle of Joseph's career and he was proud to have achieved it. It remained the event for which he was most renowned, for several decades.

==== 1923 shipments (camels, birds and kangaroos) ====
In July 1923, Ellis Joseph made a large shipment to the United States using two separate ships.

He bought 55 camels, from a camel depot of the government of South Australia and shipped these to America on the steamer Eastern. (or Easterner). The camels were destined for American zoos. Camels are not native to Australia but were imported as a means of transport in arid areas. By the time of the shipment, such camels were being replaced by motorised transport. Feral camels still exist in Australia, in large numbers.

Ellis Joseph also sent a shipment of birds and 150 kangaroos to New York on the steamer Medic. He had been advertising to purchase live kangaroos in June 1923.

==== 1924 shipment ====
In September 1924, Ellis Joseph imported several elephants on board the SS American Trader, which were unloaded at Hoboken.

=== End of Australian operations ===
==== Opposition to wildlife exports and regulatory changes ====
In 1923, although still exporting Australian animals in that year, Ellis Joseph was not allowed to reattempt the export of live platypuses to the United States. Influencing that decision was that three platypuses destined for export had died while in captivity in Australia. After having spent much time and effort since 1916 pursuing this aim, it must have been a great disappointment.

Public and expert opinion was changing in favour of animal welfare and conservation of wildlife in its natural environment, and it is likely that Joseph's reputation had suffered some damage due to the revelations about his contractual arrangements in 1922. He had also had a falling out with the Le Soueth brothers, losing access to their influence.

Changing attitudes and a growing conservation movement led to increased regulation of the wildlife trade in Australia. In 1923, almost at the same time as Joseph's 1923 shipment to the United States, a prohibition was placed by the Minister of Customs on the export certain species from Australia. From that time on, export of such wildlife would be guided by recommendations to the Collector of Customs by an advisory committee in each state of Australia but no export permit would be granted for 'purely commercial reasons'.

For a commercial dealer in rare and exotic animals such as Joseph, the consequences of the new Australian regulatory arrangements were enormous; it effectively would end his ability to export many Australian animals and birds. Joseph's 1923 shipment included only wildlife that he claimed had been captured prior to the prohibition, that he claimed he had purchased from 'public gardens'—presumably zoos—or from private owners. It seems that Ellis Joseph's Australian-based wildlife import and export operations ceased after 1923.

==== Sale of Highfield Hall ====
Ellis Joseph's 17.75 acre estate 'Highfield Hall', with its 12-room house and offices, had been his home since November 1918. Its extensive grounds housed his personal menagerie and were used as a holding location for animals prior to their shipment and sale. Highfield Hall probably had a small farm, and it had been used, before it was owned by Ellis Joseph, to run cattle and raise poultry. The estate probably was at least partially self-sufficient in providing food for the animals and birds Ellis Joseph kept there.

In October 1925, an auction was held at 'Highfield Hall' for 'building materials' including a large quantity of hardwood timber, a 60-foot long shed, 170 bird cages, incubators, a brooder and a tip-dray with horse and harness, on the "instructions from Mrs. Moore, who is acting for Mr. Joseph". Mrs Moore was Hannah Moore, who like her husband Arthur Moore was an animal keeper. The pair had looked after the estate during Ellis Joseph's absence.

Ellis Joseph's house and estate, its luxurious furnishings, his possessions—including a "Magnificent collection of valuable Skins"—and his motor car—a 1920 Buick— were put to a second auction on 5 December 1925, "under instructions from and for and on account of Mrs. H.J. Moore, in consequence of her early departure for abroad." The inventory of the auction, which was advertised as "The sale of the season", indicates that Ellis Joseph was by that time a very wealthy man.

By 1926, 'Highfield Hall' had been sold for £6,500, Joseph having been based in the United States from 1923.

==== Legacy in Australia ====
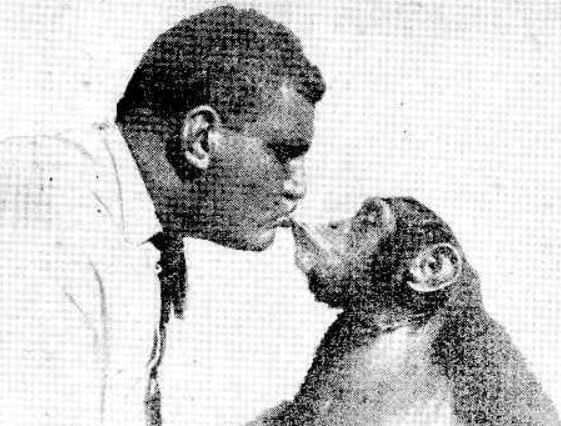
Ellis Joseph & 'Mike' (Daily Telegraph (Sydney) 4-Oct-1927)

Ellis Joseph's main legacy was the extensive animal collections at the Perth, Sydney, Melbourne and Adelaide zoos.

A newspaper photograph in the Daily Telegraph of 4 October 1927, suggests that he may have made a visit to Sydney in that year. The caption read "Kiss and be friends — Ellis Joseph, the animal dealer, "makes up" with his friend Mike the chimpanzee, after slight difference."

"Molly the orangutan", an animal who was said to have been captured by Ellis Joseph in Borneo, and who belonged to the same Mr Thomas Fox of Marrickville who had bought the first 'Casey', toured Australia into the early 1930s. By 1931, Ellis Joseph's Australian home "Highfield Hall" had become a boarding school. The land later was subdivided.

Ellis Joseph was still well known in the 1930s, being remembered mainly as the man who had exported the first live platypus. After that, he faded from memory.

=== Later years in the USA ===
After his return to the US, Ellis Joseph lived in New York from 1923 and, from 1927 until his death, in the Bronx, New York, in a neighbourhood not far from the Bronx Zoo. In an advertisement from this period, he claimed to be, "The Largest Dealer in Animals and Birds in the World".

==== Live animal trade ====
Ellis Joseph appears to have relocated at least some of his Australian menagerie from 'Highfield Hall' in Sydney (sold by 1926) to a location at Conner Street and Hollers Avenue in the Bronx, New York.

In the 1920s, he was trading live animals in the United States. Between 1925 and 1928, he sold four elephants: two to circuses and two to zoos.

==== Museum gifts ====
The president of the American Museum of Natural History noted in his annual report for 1926, that Ellis Joseph had supplied (dead) specimens to the museum.

"The New York Zoological Society and Mr. Ellis S. Joseph continued to supply the Department with important specimens for preservation in its study collections, which have been well used by specialists from the Yale, Johns Hopkins, and Columbia departments of anatomy and neuro-anatomy."

The same annual report included Ellis Stanley Joseph in the list of life members of the museum, and stated that he had provided, "by Gift", the following specimens:

For Mammalogy: "1 Anteater, giant; 2 baboons; 1 baboon, hamadrlyas; 1 eyra cat; 1 fishing cat; 3 gazelles; 1 addra gazelle; 1 Semmerring's gazelle; 1 hyaena; 1 spotted hyaena; 1 ibex; 1 leopard; 1 lynx caracal; 1 sheep ".

For Comparative Anatomy: "1 Anteater, giant (Myrmecophaga jubata), South America. 4 Baboons; 2 baboons, hamadryas, Africa; 2 hyeenas, Africa; 1 kangaroo, Australia; 1 llama, young; 1 macaque; 1 mandrill, Africa; 1 mangabey; 2 monkeys, green, Africa; 2 monkeys, green (Erythrocebbus), A f r i c a; 1 monkey, putty - nosed, West Africa; 1 ostrich; 1 pelican, Egyptian."

It is not clear whether these animals were killed to create museum specimens or had already died when gifted to the museum. In earlier years, Ellis Joseph had been known to sell or gift to museums only those animals of his that had died, but the number of animals gifted, in just one year, suggests either the slaughtering of at least part of his personal menagerie occurred in 1926 or an exceptional death rate in that year.

Ellis Joseph also gave gifts of specimens to the museum in 1928 and 1930.

== Retirement and death ==
He retired in 1933. For the last five years of his life, Ellis Joseph suffered poor health. He died on 16 September 1938, of a heart attack aged 66 years old, at his home at 179 Mosholu Parkway, the Bronx. So ended an extraordinary and eventful life.
