= Albert Sherbourne Le Souef =

Australian zoologist

Albert Sherbourne Le Souef (30 January 1877 – 31 March 1951) was an Australian zoologist.

Le Souef was the son of Albert Alexander Cochrane Le Souef (1828–1902) and Caroline Le Souef (1834–1915), daughter of ornithologist John Cotton. Two of his brothers were zoologists Ernest Albert Le Souef and Dudley Le Souef. He was the first director of the Taronga Zoo from 1916 to 1939. He published The Wild Animals of Australasia (1926) with Henry Burrell, with text on bats contributed by Ellis Troughton but otherwise largely plagiarised from an earlier work by Oldfield Thomas.
