= Andrew Wilkie (zoo director) =

Australian zoo administrator (1853–1948)

Andrew Arthur Wellesley Wilkie (c. March 1853 – 1 February 1948) was director of Melbourne Zoo from 1923 to 1936, and closely associated with that institution for 70 years. He was a major influence on the planning and development of Perth Zoo.

== Early life ==
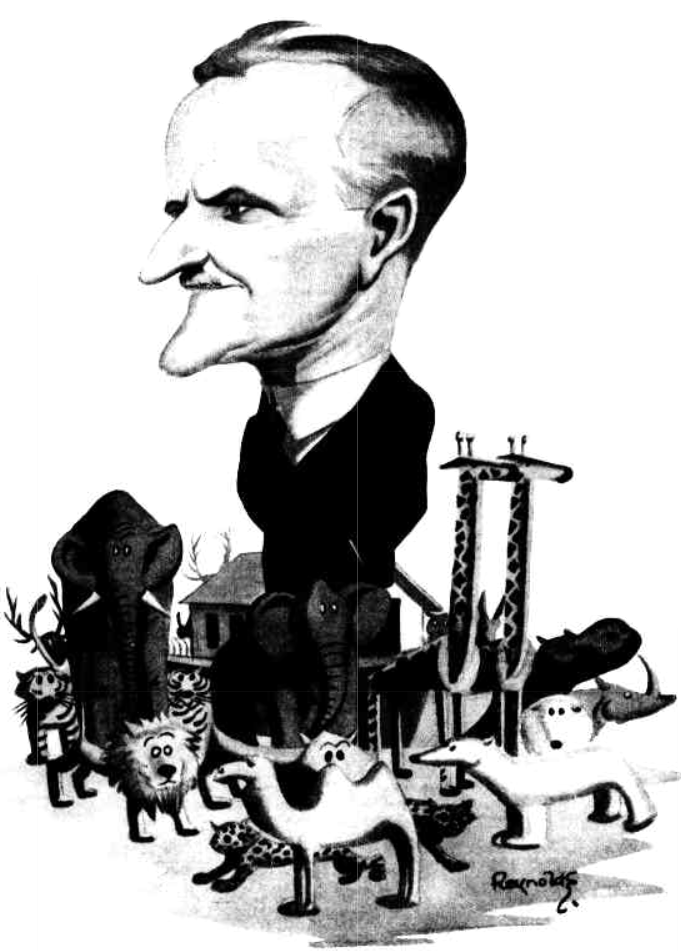
1928 caricature by Reynolds

Wilkie was born in London, a son of Andrew Wilkie and his wife Adelaide Wilkie, née Rain. He was a grand-nephew of the Scottish painter Sir David Wilkie His father, a fair painter himself, was a retired British Army officer and had a position with the Victorian State Railways.

== Career ==
His first job was as assistant to botanist Ferdinand von Mueller, first secretary of the Zoological Society, which in 1858 was granted £3,000 and 33 acres (13 ha) of bushland at Richmond Park on a bend of the Yarra River opposite the Botanic Gardens.

When in 1869 the Acclimatization Society acquired land at Royal Park to raise deer, golden pheasants, hares and partridges (for the benefit of sportsmen), Von Mueller secured the job of attendant there for his young protégé and his elder brother David Wilkie. Albert Le Souef was the first director of what became Melbourne Zoo, followed in 1902 by his son Dudley Le Souef.

Wilkie had been head gardener for several years in 1896 when another of Albert's sons, Ernest Albert Le Souef, was appointed director of the yet-to-be-created Zoological Gardens at South Perth, Western Australia. He enlisted the aid of Wilkie, who arrived at Fremantle in 1896 by the steamer Barcoo, and with the assistance of Henry Giles (later head keeper), laid out the zoo's parks, enclosures and pathways.

He was appointed overseer of Melbourne Zoo some time before 1913 and made acting director in March 1923 when Dudley Le Souef retired (he died in September), and appointed director in August.

He retired in December 1936 after being associated with the zoo for 69 years. He was succeeded by Hector Kendall, who was appointed assistant director in March 1933 and had been honorary veterinary surgeon to the zoo for 20 years. His father, William T. Kendall (10 February 1851 – 11 August 1936) "Father of zoological science in Australia", was the zoo's honorary vet. for 50 years.

== Death ==
Wilkie died at his home in Brunswick, aged a month short of 95.

== Family ==
Wilkie married Josephine Henderson Braid on 18 June 1879. Their children were: Norman Wellesley Wilkie (1880 – 25 October 1942), Una, Alec (Alexander Reginald Wilkie born 2 February 1885 died 10 September 1962, journalist Sydney Morning Herald), Elsie, David (died before 1942), and Jack.

The artist and gallery director Leslie Wilkie was a nephew.

== Publications ==
A. A. W. Wilkie; Annie R. Osborn (1918). Almost Human: Reminiscences of Melbourne Zoo. Whitcombe and Tombs.
