= Dudley Le Souef =

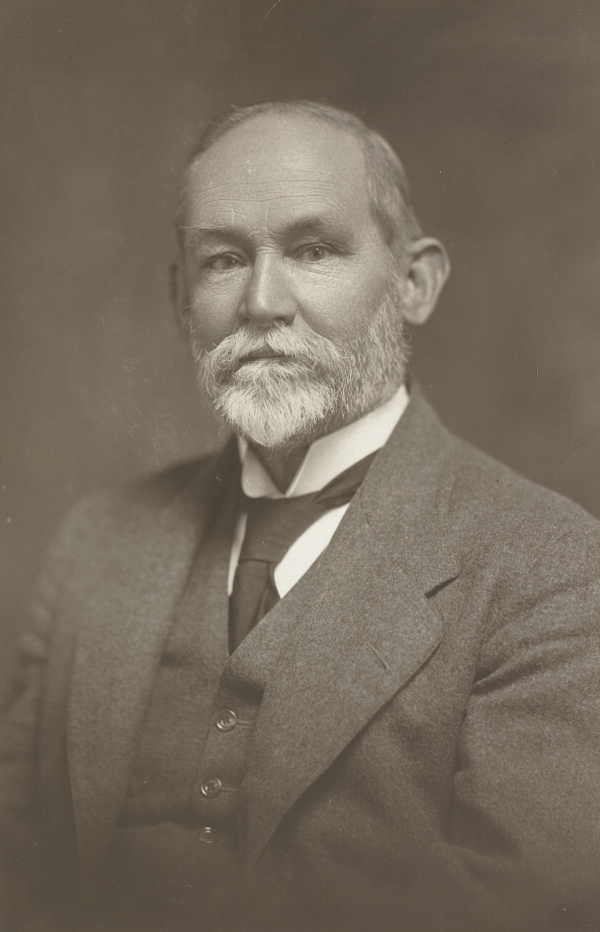
W. H. D. Le Souef

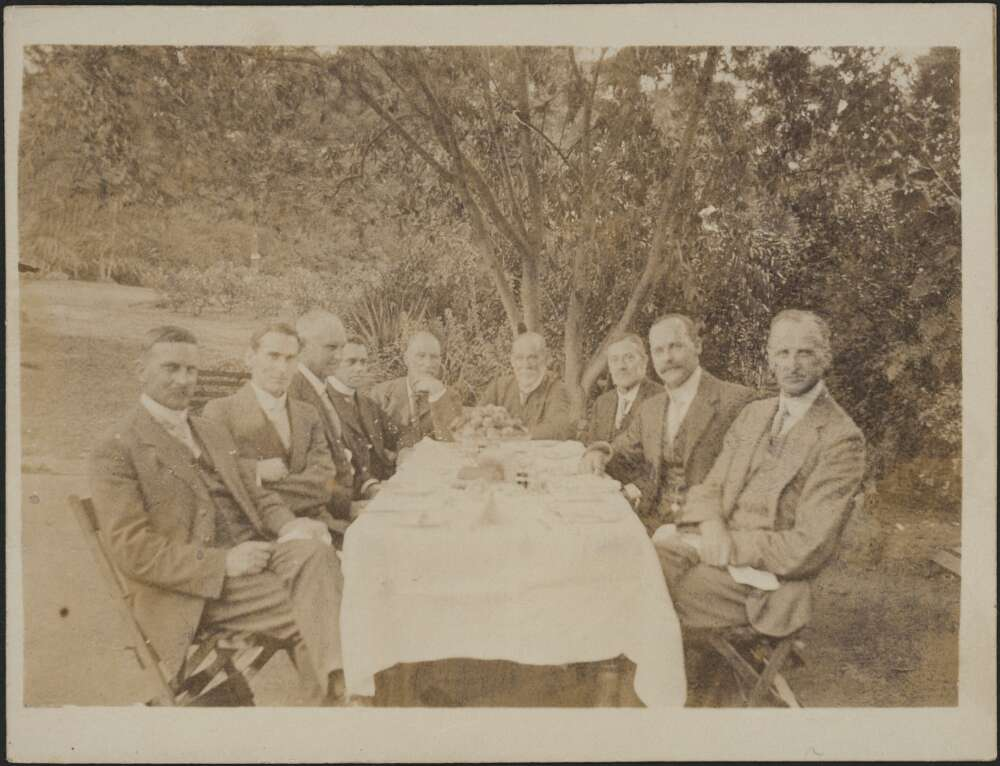
Meeting of Royal Australasian Ornithologists Union (RAOU) with members Dr J. Leach, L. Chandler, C. McLennan, C. Barrett, A.J. Campbell, Dudley Le Souef, T. Tregallas, Z. Gray, Gregory Mathews

William Henry Dudley Le Souef (28 September 1856 – 6 September 1923) was a founding member and founding Secretary of the Royal Australasian Ornithologists Union (RAOU) in 1901, also serving as President of that body 1907–1909. His egg collection was sold to Henry Luke White, becoming part of the H. L. White Collection which passed to the National Museum of Victoria.

Around 1902 he succeeded his father as director of Melbourne Zoo, and held that position until March 1923, when he retired due to ill-health. He had been violently attacked and robbed in 1919 and never properly recovered. His successor was Andrew Wilkie.

Le Souef was born on 28 September 1856, son of Albert Alexander Cochrane Le Souef and Caroline Le Souef, daughter of John Cotton. Two of his brothers were zoologists Ernest Albert Le Souef and Albert Sherbourne Le Souef.

== Works ==
- The animals of Australia : animals, reptiles and amphibians, by Arthur Henry Shakespeare Lucas, assisted by Le Souef. Melbourne: Whitcombe and Tombs, 1909.
- The birds of Australia, by Arthur Henry Shakespeare Lucas and Le Souef. London: Whitcombe and Tombs Limited, 1911.
