= Henry Burrell =

Australian naturalist (1873–1945)

Henry (Harry) James Burrell OBE (19 January 1873 – 29 July 1945) was an Australian naturalist who specialised in the study of monotremes. He was the first person to successfully keep the platypus in captivity and was a lifelong collector of specimens and contributor of journal articles on monotremes.

== Biography ==
Henry James Burrell was born in Rushcutters Bay, Sydney, the fourth son of Douglas and Sarah Rose Burrell (née Stacey). He had some schooling but had an itinerant lifestyle during which he spent some years as a vaudeville comedian. In 1901 he married Susan Emily Naegueli, a 42-year-old divorcee, and settled at Caermarthen station, Manilla, New South Wales, which was home to Susan's parents.

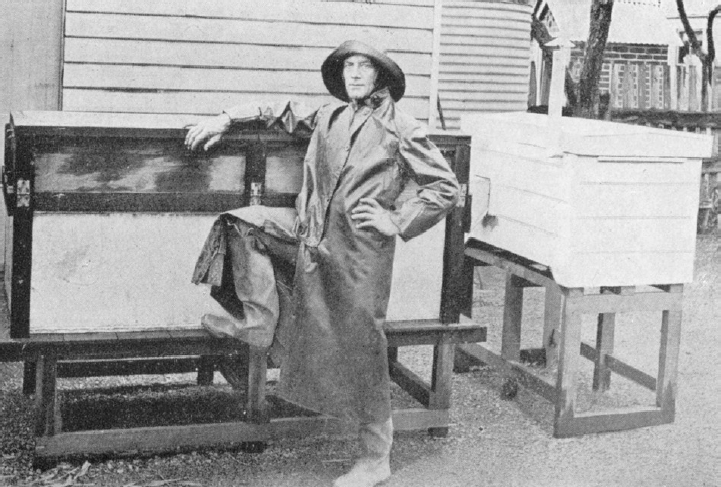
Henry Burrell with his portable platypusary

He set up a small native zoo and became interested in the platypus, Ornithorhynchus anatinus, which he had been told could not be kept in captivity. He spent much of his time studying the platypus on the rivers surrounding the station: the Namoi, Manilla and Macdonald. He captured some specimens and managed to keep them alive in a portable artificial habitat of his own devising, which he christened a "platypusary". He made the first exhibition of the platypus at the Moore Park Zoological Gardens (moved and renamed Taronga Zoological Gardens in 1917) in 1910, and with Ellis Stanley Joseph he took the first live platypuses to be seen outside Australia to the United States in 1922. He was also the first person to successfully keep a baby platypus in captivity.

His interest extended to the other monotremes, the echidnas, and he made a film showing the habits of both monotremes. He made recordings of their vocalizations and contributed articles on the monotremes to the Australian Encyclopedia.

In 1926 he published The Wild Animals of Australasia (with Albert Sherbourne Le Souef) and in the next year, The Platypus, its Discovery, Zoological Position Form and Characteristics, Habits, Life History, etc. It was regarded as the authoritative work on the species despite Burrell being denied official sanction and hence being restricted in his area of study. In 1927 Burrell was stricken with paralysis; he recovered, but moved to Sydney to continue working.

Burrell was a regular contributor to scientific journals. He was a corresponding member of the Zoological Society of London and of the Australian Museum, and a fellow of the Royal Zoological Society of New South Wales amongst other memberships of learned societies; he collected specimens for the University of Sydney and the Commonwealth government.

In 1937 he received an OBE. His wife died in 1941, and in 1942 Burrell married Daisy Ellen Brown. Burrell died suddenly of heart disease on 29 July 1945 at his home at Randwick, New South Wales. His collection of photographic negatives was donated to the Australian Museum, and his unique complete sequence of monotreme exhibits to the Australian Institute of Anatomy in Canberra.

== Thylacine ==
Burrell is credited with a notorious 1921 photo of a thylacine (or Tasmanian tiger), showing it standing in the bush with a chicken in its mouth. Robert Paddle, author of The Last Tasmanian Tiger: The History and Extinction of the Thylacine, credits this picture with adding much to the reputation of the thylacine as a poultry killer. The image was published in the Australian Museum Magazine and The Wild Animals of Australasia.

Burrell's original photo clearly shows that the animal was captive, but the version that appeared in the newspaper was cropped to remove these details. Researcher Carol Freeman analysed the photo and concluded that the thylacine shown was a mounted specimen, posed for the camera with the bird in its mouth. However, the notion that the thylacine was a taxidermied mount was challenged by Robert Paddle in 2008. Paddle believed that the thylacine was a living specimen from Hobart's Beaumaris Zoo.

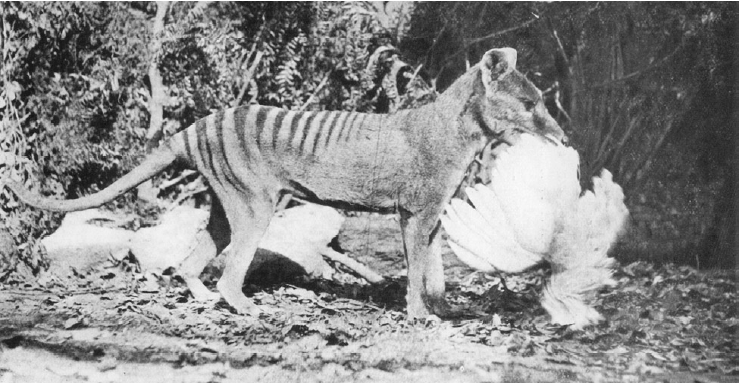
The image published in the newspaper

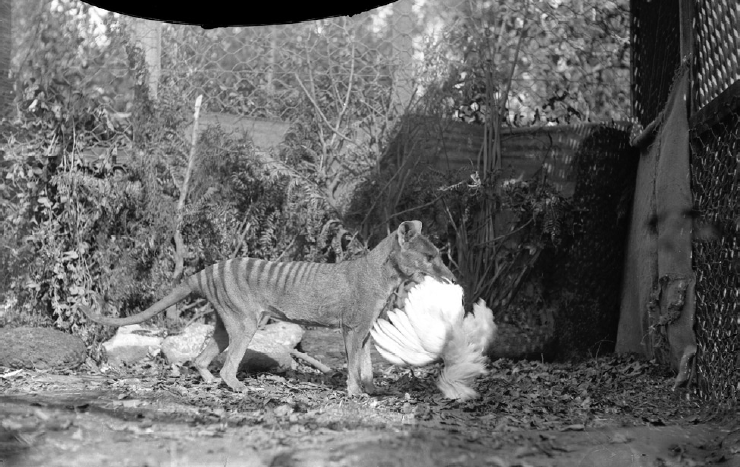
The original uncropped image
