= Charles Helm =

South African missionary (1844–1915)

- Born: Charles Daniel Helm; 28 September 1844; Suurbraak, Cape Colony
- Died: 14 September 1915 (aged 70); Bulawayo, Southern Rhodesia
- Occupation: Missionary

Charles Daniel Helm (28 September 1844 – 14 September 1915) was a Protestant missionary and trusted confident of King Lobengula of Matabeleland who played a controversial role as an interpreter during the drafting and signing of the Rudd Concession with agents of Cecil Rhodes's British South Africa Company in 1888.

== Family life ==
Helm was born in Suurbraak, Cape Colony on 28 September 1844, the son of Daniel Helm, the missionary there. His maternal grandfather was William Anderson. He trained as a missionary at New College, London where he met Baroness Elizabeth von Puttkamer whom he married in 1873.

== Career ==
He became a missionary with the London Missionary Society. He then returned briefly to Suurbraak, running the mission there following his father's death. However, in 1875 he established a mission at Hope Fountain near Lobengula's capital Bulawayo. Helm had studied Ndebele language and culture, and subsequently gained the confidence of Lobengula.

== Rudd Concession ==
In October 1888 Rhodes sent three agents, Charles Rudd, James Rochfort Maguire and Francis Thompson, to Matabeleland. According to historians such as Dickson A. Mungazi, Helm was in the pay of Rhodes and deliberately misled the king regarding the contents of the agreement he signed. John Lockhart and Christopher Woodhouse asserted in their 1963 biography of Rhodes that Helm had "become one of Rhodes's men"—Stanlake J. W. T. Samkange cites this biography in his 1968 book Origins of Rhodesia to support the statement that Helm was "a mere mercenary, a paid hack of Rhodes". John Semple Galbraith, in 1974, asserts that "there is no evidence that Rhodes 'bought' Helm, only that he tried", but that in any case Helm firmly favoured the Rhodes proposal as he thought it might lead to Matabeleland becoming more receptive towards Christianity.

== Rhodesian Ridgeback ==
Helm is credited with bringing two rough coated and grey-black bitches from Kimberley, South Africa, which were then bred, by Cornelius van Rooyen, to finally produce the Rhodesian Ridgeback breed of dog.

He died on 14 September 1915 in Bulawayo.
