= Cornelius van Rooyen =

Cornelius Johannes van Rooyen (1859-1915), also known as 'Nellis' van Rooyen, was an early colonial settler of Rhodesia (today Zimbabwe), big game hunter, and hunting guide. He is best known today as the breeder of predecessors of the Rhodesian Ridgeback dog breed, once known as 'van Rooyen's lion dog'.

He was born in the area of Uitenhage, Cape Colony, on 5 November 1859 and baptised in the Dutch Reformed Church at Alexandria, South Africa on 11 January 1860, the son of Gerrit (sometimes Gert or Gerhardus) van Rooyen and his wife Cornelia Jacoba Crous. Cornelis was the third of their four known children.

Van Rooyen worked as a hunter and herder in the area roughly bounded by Pretoria, Victoria Falls, and Umtali, before the arrival of other colonial settlers.

He was already an accomplished hunter by age 19, when he married Maria Margareta Vermaak. Maria was born 13 April 1867 and baptised in the Nederduitsch Hervormde Kerk Potchefstroom on 21 July 1867, the daughter of Salomo Vermaak and Maria Margaretha Riekert.

He became an early colonial settler of what was then called Rhodesia, in the area around Mangwe. He fought on the side of the colonists and British South Africa Company, in the First and Second Matabele Wars. He was a friend of the famous big game hunter and hunting guide, Frederick Selous (1851-1917). During his life, he came to know many of the notable participants of the period of British colonial expansion in southern Africa, including Lobengula, Paul Kruger, Cecil Rhodes, Leander Starr ('Dr. Jim') Jameson, Raleigh Grey, and Randolph Churchill. Despite knowing Jameson, and another of Lobengula's trusted white friends Rev. Helm, van Rooyen does not seem to have been involved in high politics and the deceiving of Lobengula over the Rudd Concession (1888) that led to the end of the Matabele kingdom.

In 1879, Reverend Charles Daniel Helm (1844-1915), brought two dogs (named Lorna and Powder) to his mission at Hope Fountain, near what is now Bulawayo. These were hunting dogs of the Khoikhoi people or dogs inheriting their bloodline. Van Rooyen was seeking to breed dogs for tracking big game, especially lions, and noted the courage of these dogs in the presence of lions. However, the dogs were in, his opinion, too deficient in scenting ability and speed to be useful to him as hunting dogs. He began to cross breed the dogs with various European dog breeds. Van Rooyen spent the next 35 years breeding dogs. His selection criterion, was "A good dog was one which survived.— a bad one was one which did not." The dogs that he bred are the predecessors of the Rhodesian Ridgeback.

In 1908, he accompanied an emerging trader in wild animals, Ellis Josephs, on an expedition to capture wild animals for sale to zoos.

He died at Bulawayo, of malaria, pneumonia, and heart failure on 20 January 1915, and was buried at Plumtree, Zimbabwe. His death certificate shows his residence at the time of his death as 'Van Rooyen's Rest' which was in the Mangwe District. His wife, Maria, died the following year on 15 September 1916 in Bulawayo of shock resulting from burns sustained.
