= John Cotton's Birds of the Port Phillip District of New South Wales 1843–1849 =

1974 book by Allan McEvey

John Cotton's Birds of the Port Phillip District of New South Wales 1843-1849
- Author: Allan McEvey
- Illustrator: John Cotton
- Language: English
- Subject: Australian bird paintings of John Cotton
- Genre: History
- Publisher: William Collins (Australia): Sydney
- Publication date: 1974
- Publication place: Australia
- Media type: Print (hardcover) with slipcase
- Pages: 128
- ISBN: 0-00-211439-9

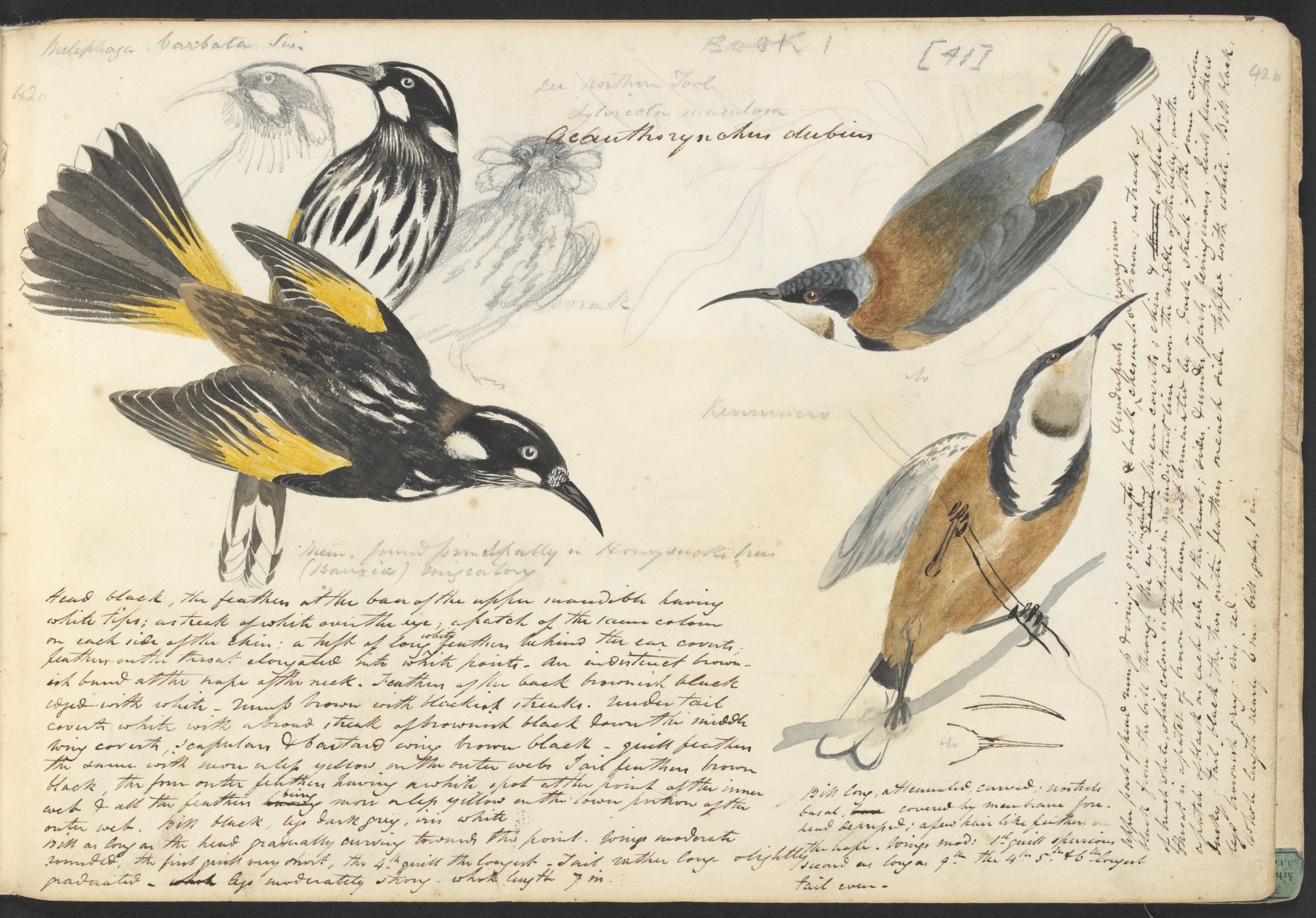
Page 41 of Cotton's notebook

John Cotton's Birds of the Port Phillip District of New South Wales 1843–1849 is a book published by William Collins (Australia), in a limited edition of 850 copies. It catalogues the ornithological artwork of 19th century Australian settler John Cotton, along with biographical information about him, reproductions of selected sketches and paintings, and extracts from his journals. The 'Port Phillip District of New South Wales' in the book's title roughly corresponds geographically to the Australian state of Victoria which was only formed in 1851, shortly after Cotton's death.

The book is 230 mm high by 324 mm wide and was issued in a slipcase. It was authored by Allan McEvey and contains a foreword by Alec H. Chisholm, as well as a biographical introduction by Cotton's great-granddaughter, Maie Casey, who also sponsored the production of the book. The book design was done by Alison Forbes.

The book is a tribute to Cotton and his ornithological and artistic talents. After migrating from England to Australia and establishing himself and his family on a sheep station on the Goulburn River, he began to study, collect and sketch the birds there. However, his plans to produce a book on Victorian birds ultimately came to nothing through historical circumstance and his own early death three days before his 48th birthday, with his journals and artwork unpublished, scattered among his descendants and lost to the world for over 120 years.

Of Cotton's talents as an artist, McEvey says:

In his bird drawings his colouring is generally accurate, with some puzzling exceptions; his draughtsmanship ranges from the occasionally poor (his drawing of tails is sometimes weak), to the generally good and often excellent, and where he combines draughtsmanship, colour and a close knowledge of the species as, for example, in the White-faced Heron and Spiny-cheeked Honeyeater, he produced strikingly appealing drawings that are full of liveliness and character. One must remember that the drawings in general are preliminary sketches not finished work. In short his drawings of Australian birds are far superior to Lewin's, often better than many that have been made since, and display a genuine ability and an intimate acquaintance with the bird. They would have provided an excellent guide to common birds of south-eastern Australia at a time when only the expensive work by Gould and the inferior plates by Lewin were available.

The book was reviewed in the journal Emu by Roy Wheeler (as W.R.W.), who said:

Cotton's information would never have been published were it not for the patience and dedication of his great-granddaughter, Maie Casey, wife of one of the great sons of this country, Lord Casey. She contacted relatives from all parts of the world and brought together the greater part of John Cotton's sketch-books, paintings and writings. These she then handed to Allan McEvey former President of the RAOU and Curator of Blrds at the National Museum of Victoria in Melbourne. Again with great dedication, he carefully examined and annotated the collection and from it has now produced this book. Including a catalogue of all the drawings in the possession of Lady Casey and fine reproductions at original size of a selection, this represents a most valuable contribution not only to Victorian ornithology but to Australian ornithology as well.

There could be no one more suited to write the foreword than Alec Chisholm, OBE, Fellow of the RAOU and the greatest ornithological historian in this country. Lady Casey gives a very fine account of the family background and the struggle John Cotton had to get his brother, William, interested in his ornithological work.

To me two interesting facts stand out in John Cotton's writings. On 11 May 1843 he wrote: 'We are approaching Cape Otway. A little bird with a flame red breast flew past the stern of the ship towards the land.' This was probably the first record of migration of the Flame Robin between Tasmania and Victoria. There is still no evidence from bird-banding of this migration in spite of hundreds of birds being banded in Victoria.

The other concerns the Bell Miner. On 19 June 1843 when he crossed the King Parrot Creek, John Cotton wrote: 'Wherever there is running or constant water the bell bird may be heard uttering his sonorous clear "tink" which, from its similarity to the sound of a silver bell, when many are heard at the same time, is the origin of its name.' The Bell Miner has not been heard in that area for a very long time, possibly for more than a century.

This book is a first-class piece of Australiana and should be in all libraries with a particular interest in early history; my congratulations to all concerned with this tribute to John Cotton.
