= Crowned crane =

A crowned crane is a bird of the genus Balearica:

- Black crowned crane (Balearica pavonina)
- Grey crowned crane (Balearica regulorum)

Some authorities use the term "crowned crane" to refer generally to the genus Balearica. Likewise, the International Ornithological Committee, who standardize common species names, have also used the group name "crowned crane" in the common names of the extant species of the genus Balearica.

== See also ==
- Red-crowned crane or Japanese crane (Grus japonensis)
