= Rhodesian Ridgeback =

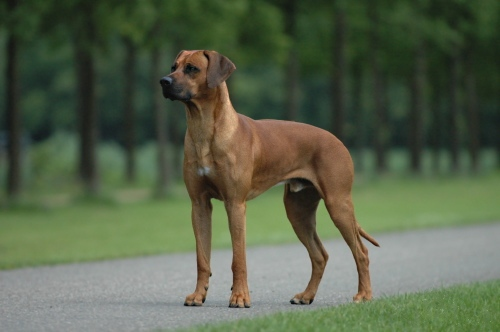
- A male Rhodesian Ridgeback
- Other names: African Lionhound; African Lion Dog
- Common nicknames: Ridgeback
- Origin: Southern Africa
Traits
Height	Males	63–69 cm (25–27 in)
	Females	61–66 cm (24–26 in)
Weight	Males	36.5 kg (80 lb)
	Females	32 kg (71 lb)
- Coat: Short and dense, sleek and glossy in appearance
- Color: Light wheaten to red wheaten. A little white on the chest and toes is permissible. A dark muzzle and ears permissible. Excessive black hair throughout the coat is undesirable. Two nose colors are permissible, black and liver.
Kennel club standards
- KUSA: standard
- Fédération Cynologique Internationale: standard

The Rhodesian Ridgeback is a large dog breed originally bred in Southern Africa. The original breed standard was drafted by F.R. Barnes, in Bulawayo, Southern Rhodesia (now Zimbabwe), in 1922, and approved by the South African Kennel Union in 1927. Its forebears can be traced to the ridged hunting and guardian dogs of the Khoikhoi. These were interbred with European dogs by the early colonists of the Cape Colony for the baying of lions.

== History ==
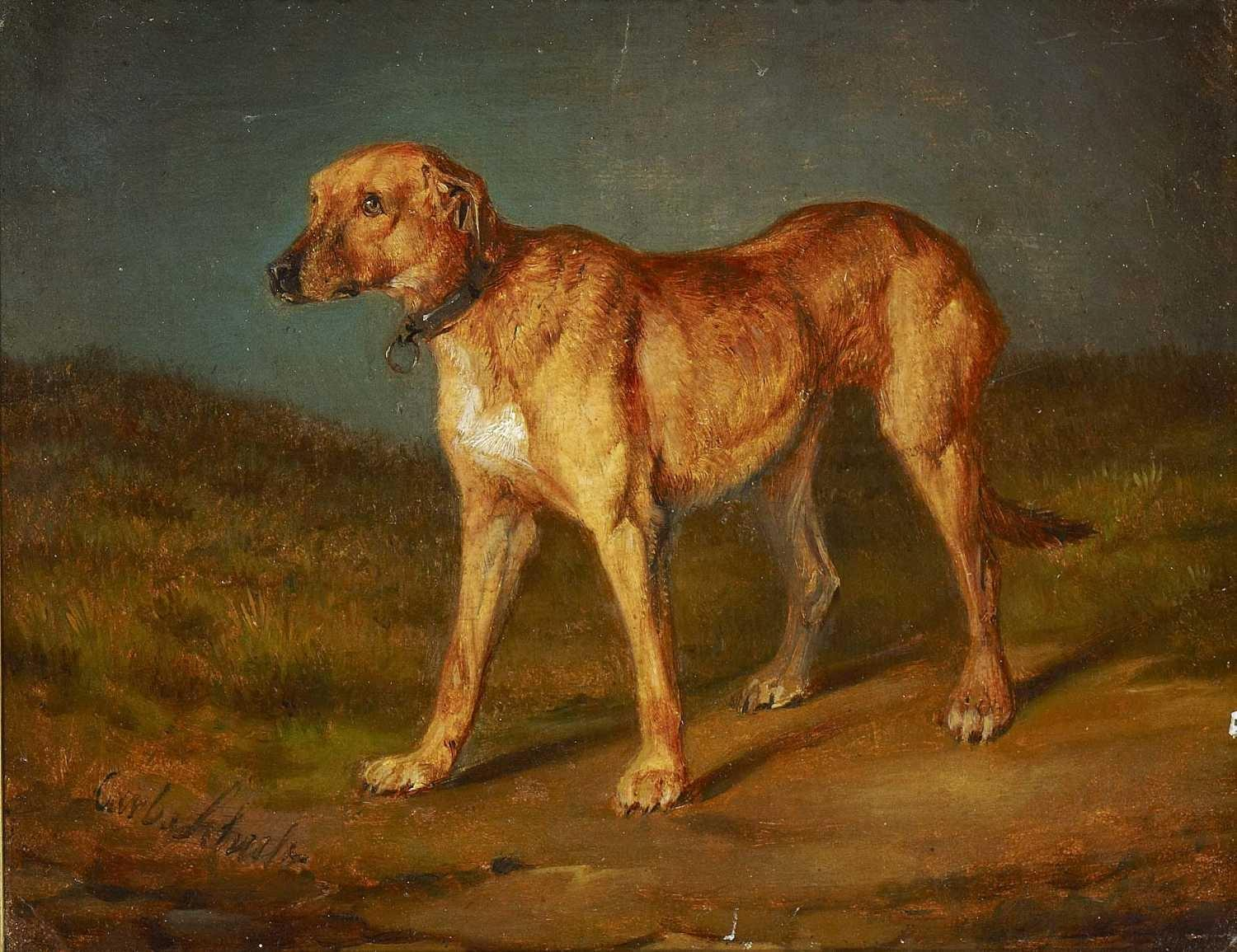
Ein Jagdhund - a Rhodesian Ridgeback by Karl Friedrich Schulz c.1834

The Khoikhoi people who lived in the Cape Peninsula when the Dutch began trading with the area during the mid 17th century, had a hunting dog which was described by Europeans as absolutely fearless and ferocious when acting as a guard dog. This dog measured approximately 18 inches (46 cm) at the withers, with a lean but muscular frame. The ears have been described both as erect but later described as hanging due to interbreeding with European dogs, but the most distinctive feature was the length of hair often growing in the reverse direction along its back. Within 53 years of the first Dutch settlements in Southern Africa, the Europeans were using these local dogs themselves.

By the early 1800s, European colonists had also imported a variety of mainly European dog breeds to this area of Africa, including such dedicated hunting dogs as Greyhounds, Mastiffs, Great Danes and Bloodhounds. The Dogo Cubano (Cuban Bloodhound), an extinct breed used for dogfighting and guarding, was highly emphasized in the composition of the early Rhodesian Ridgeback. Genetic analysis indicates that the Rhodesian Ridgeback and the Great Dane fall within the same genetic clade (group), which implies the Dane's major contribution. These breeds were bred with the indigenous African dogs, including the dog of the Khoikhoi people, which resulted in the Boer hunting dogs, generically called names such as boerhond (Boer hound) in Dutch; then its descendant language of Afrikaans, which are the chief forerunners to the modern Rhodesian Ridgeback. The sequencing of ancient dog genomes indicates that the southern African Rhodesian Ridgeback retains 4% pre-colonial ancestry.

The Rev. Charles Helm (1844–1915), son of the Rev. Daniel Helm of the London Missionary Society, was born in the Cape Colony, joined the London Missionary Society himself, and moved from the Zuurbraak (now Suurbraak) mission station just east of Swellendam (modern Western Cape Province, South Africa) to the Hope Fountain Mission in Matabeleland, Southern Rhodesia, travelling from October 1874 to December 1875, then bringing two ridged dog bitches from somewhere between Kimberley (modern Northern Cape Province, South Africa) and Swellendam with him to Hope Fountain in 1879 en route to becoming, as it would turn out, a political advisor to King Lobengula, house-host to hunter-explorer Frederick Courteney Selous, postmaster of Bulawayo and well-appreciated tooth-extractor. At Hope Fountain, now part of the city of Bulawayo, fellow South African transplant Cornelius van Rooyen (b. 1860, Uitenhage, modern Eastern Cape Province, South Africa), a big–game hunter, was married to Maria Vermaak of Bloemhof by Charles Helm in 1879 the same year Helm brought his two rough-coated grey-black bitches to the Mission. Van Rooyen saw Helm's pair of bitches and decided to breed his own dogs with them to incorporate their guarding abilities.

After initially greyer, rough-coated litters originating from Helm's dogs, van Rooyen's subsequently crossed offspring turned to redder coats, incorporating the Khoikhoi landrace dog's ridges already carried in Boer dogs within his genomes. They became the foundation stock of a kennel which developed dogs over the next 35 years with the ability to bay a lion, to not attack it outright but to harass it by darting in and out with quick snaps and confusing the animal until the hunter shot it. These dogs were used to bay lions, and hunt boars and other big game as well as to clear farmlands of wild pigs and baboons, and they can kill a baboon independently of a human hunter's collaboration.

The original breed standard was drafted in 1922 by F. R. Barnes on founding the first Rhodesian Ridgeback Club at a Bulawayo Kennel Club show, then in Southern Rhodesia (now in Zimbabwe), and based on that of the Dalmatian. In 1927, Barnes' standard was approved by the South African Kennel Union. Outside the subcontinent and internationally, the first Rhodesian Ridgebacks in Britain were shown by Mrs. Edward Foljambe in 1928. In 1950, Mr. and Mrs. William H. O'Brien of Arizona brought six carefully selected Rhodesian Ridgebacks to the US from South Africa. He and his wife and Margaret Lowthian of California began the process of getting the breed accepted by the American Kennel Club. Similarly, in 1952, The Rhodesian Ridgeback Club of Great Britain was founded at Crufts to promote the breed around the United Kingdom to show judges, so a standard for the breed might be recognised. In 1954 the first Challenge Certificates were awarded to dogs shown as Rhodesian Ridgebacks at United Kingdom competitions, toward their subsequent recognition by The Kennel Club of Great Britain, and in 1955 the American Kennel Club recognised the Rhodesian Ridgeback breed as a member of the hound group.

=== Culling of puppies ===
Traditionally, many Rhodesian Ridgeback puppies were culled at birth for numerous reasons, including ridgelessness. Some breed parent clubs and canine registries in Europe have even made the culling of ridgeless whelps a requirement. Contemporary breeders are increasingly opting for surgical sterilisation of these offspring to ensure they will not be bred but can live into maturity as non-showing, non-breeding pets. It was pointed out on the BBC One investigative documentary Pedigree Dogs Exposed that the Rhodesian Ridgeback Club of Great Britain's "code of ethics", which is ratified annually by the kennel club, states that "Ridgeless puppies shall be culled", and that "mismarked" puppies will only ever be sold on condition that they are never shown, and are neutered. The Rhodesian Ridgeback Club defended itself pointing to the statement that follows, "if a breeder finds this morally impossible [to cull the puppy] the puppy shall be homed..." as indication that culling is not mandatory, but preferred. It was only after the publicity surrounding the promotion of culling that they reversed their code of ethics to say "no healthy puppy will be culled".

== Description ==
=== Appearance ===
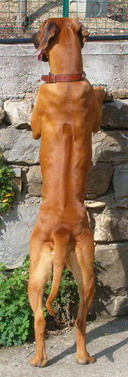
Rhodesian Ridgeback showing distinctive ridge

The appearance standard of the Rhodesian Ridgeback originated in Rhodesia (Zimbabwe) in 1922 and has remained virtually unchanged since. The Rhodesian Ridgeback's distinguishing feature is the ridge of hair running along its back in the opposite direction from the rest of its coat. It consists of a fan-like area formed by two whorls of hair (called "crowns") and tapers from immediately behind the shoulders down to the level of the hips. The ridge is usually about 2 inches (51 mm) in width at its widest point. It is believed to originate from the dog used by the original African dog population which had a similar ridge.

Male Rhodesian Ridgebacks usually stand 25–27 in (64–69 cm) at the withers and weigh about 36.5 kg (80 lb) (FCI standard); females are typically 24–26 inches (61–66 cm) tall and about 32 kg (71 lb) in weight. Rhodesian Ridgebacks are typically very muscular and have a light wheaten to red wheaten coat, which should be short, dense, sleek and glossy in appearance, and neither woolly nor silky.

White is acceptable on the chest and toes, but excessive white is considered a fault. The presence of black guard hairs or ticking is not addressed in the AKC standard, although the elaboration of the AKC standard notes the amount of black or dark brown in the coat should not be excessive. The FCI standard states that excessive black hairs throughout the coat are highly undesirable. Rhodesian Ridgebacks sometimes have a dark mask, but it is not considered a fault to have no mask at all. The dog's nose should be black or liver in keeping with the colour of the dog. No other coloured nose is permissible. The brown nose is a recessive gene. It is not as common as a black nose; some breeders believe the inclusion of brown noses in a breeding program is necessary for maintaining the vibrancy of the coat. The eyes should be round and should reflect the dog's colour: dark eyes with a black nose, amber eyes with a brown (liver) nose.

Other dog breeds also have a reverse line of fur along the spine, including the Kombai, the Phu Quoc ridgeback dog and Thai Ridgeback. The Thai Ridgeback is a crossbreed of the Phu Quoc; historians have speculated the relationship between the Rhodesian Ridgeback and the Phu Quoc with suggestions that historically one breed may have been imported to the other's location.

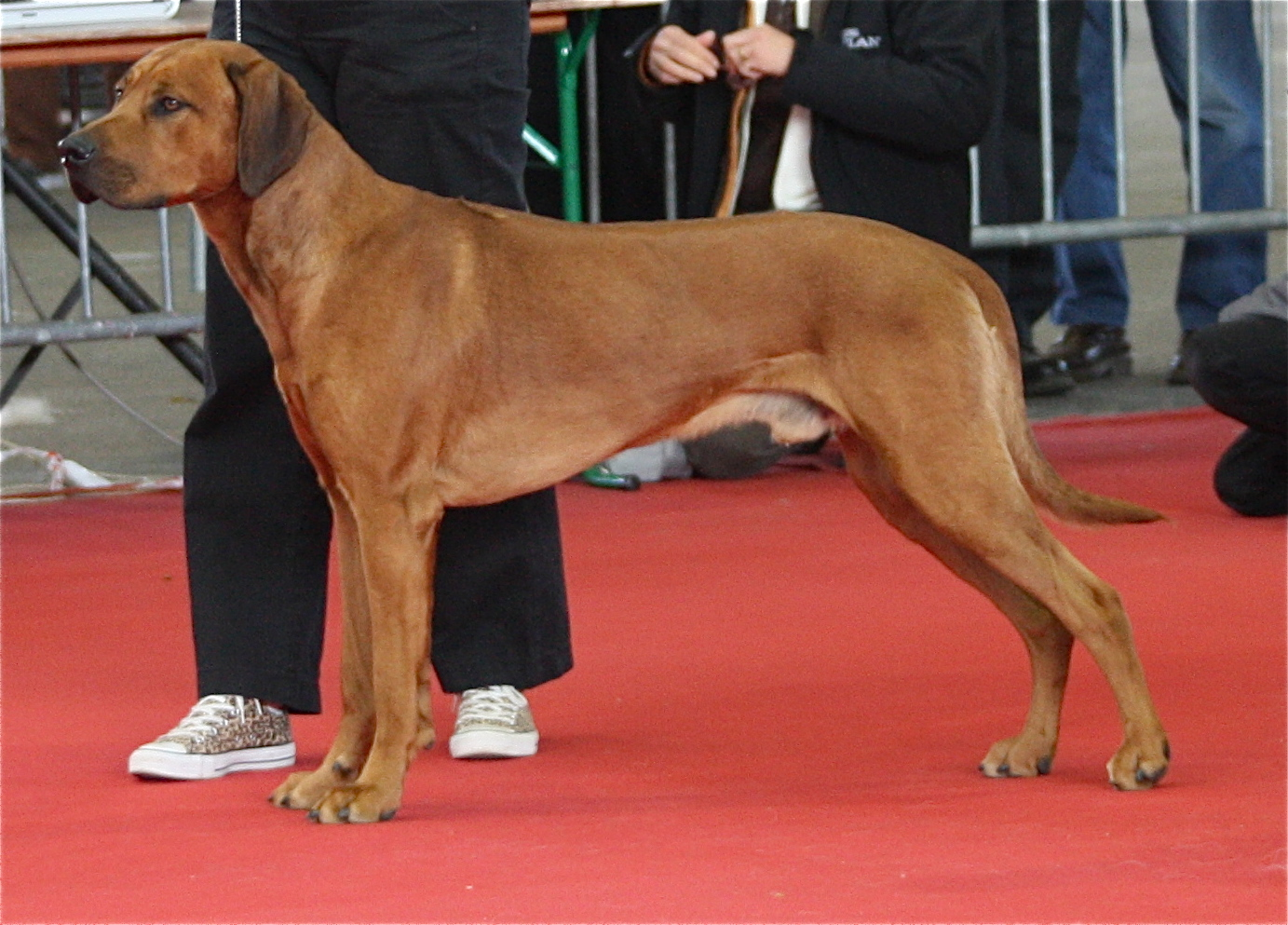
Rhodesian Ridgeback

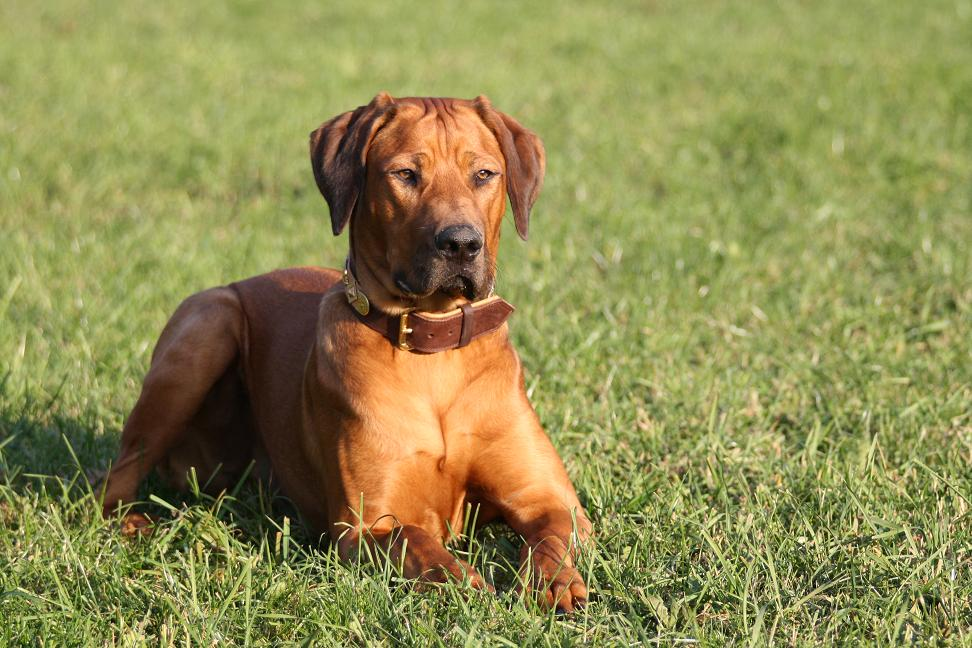
Rhodesian Ridgeback

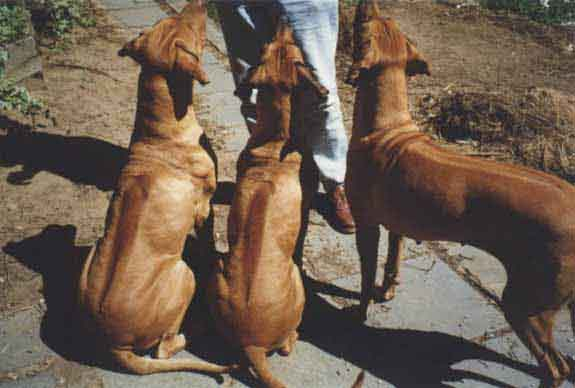
Examples of ridges

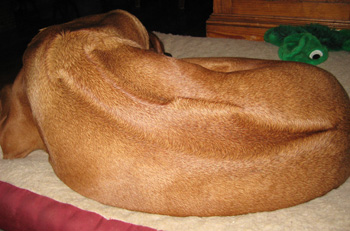
Ridge with an extra whorl

=== Temperament ===
The FCI breed standard describes Rhodesian Ridgebacks as dignified and intelligent. The UKC standard states that the breed can be "aloof with strangers, but is never shy or aggressive."

Despite their imposing appearance and athleticism, Rhodesian Ridgebacks have a sensitive side. Francis R. Barnes, who wrote the first standard in 1922, acknowledged that "rough treatment...should never be administered to these dogs, especially when they are young. They go to pieces with handling of that kind." The Rhodesian Ridgeback accepts correction as long as it is fair and justified, and as long as it comes from someone whom the dog knows and trusts.

== Genetics of the ridge ==
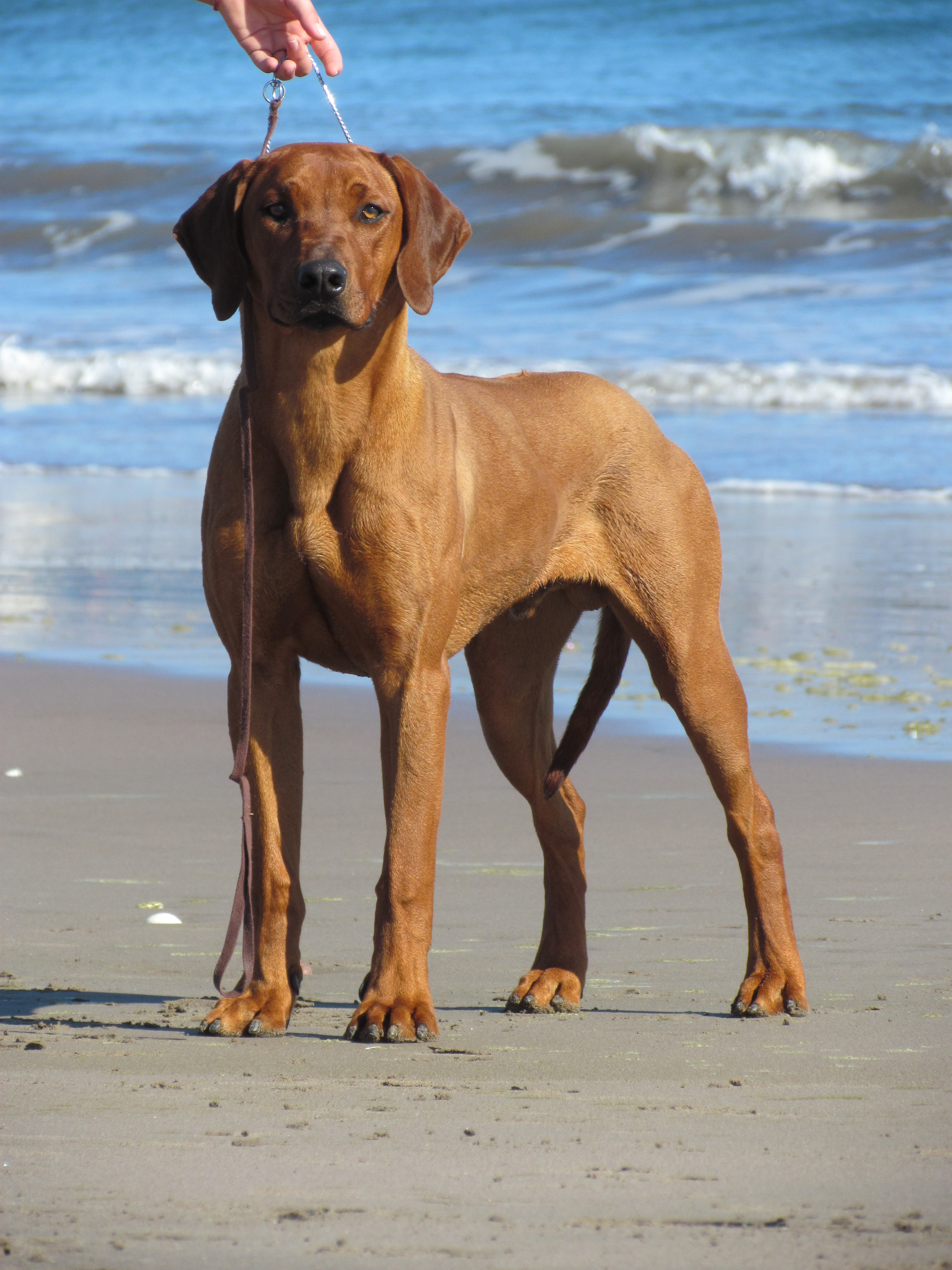
Male Rhodesian Ridgeback

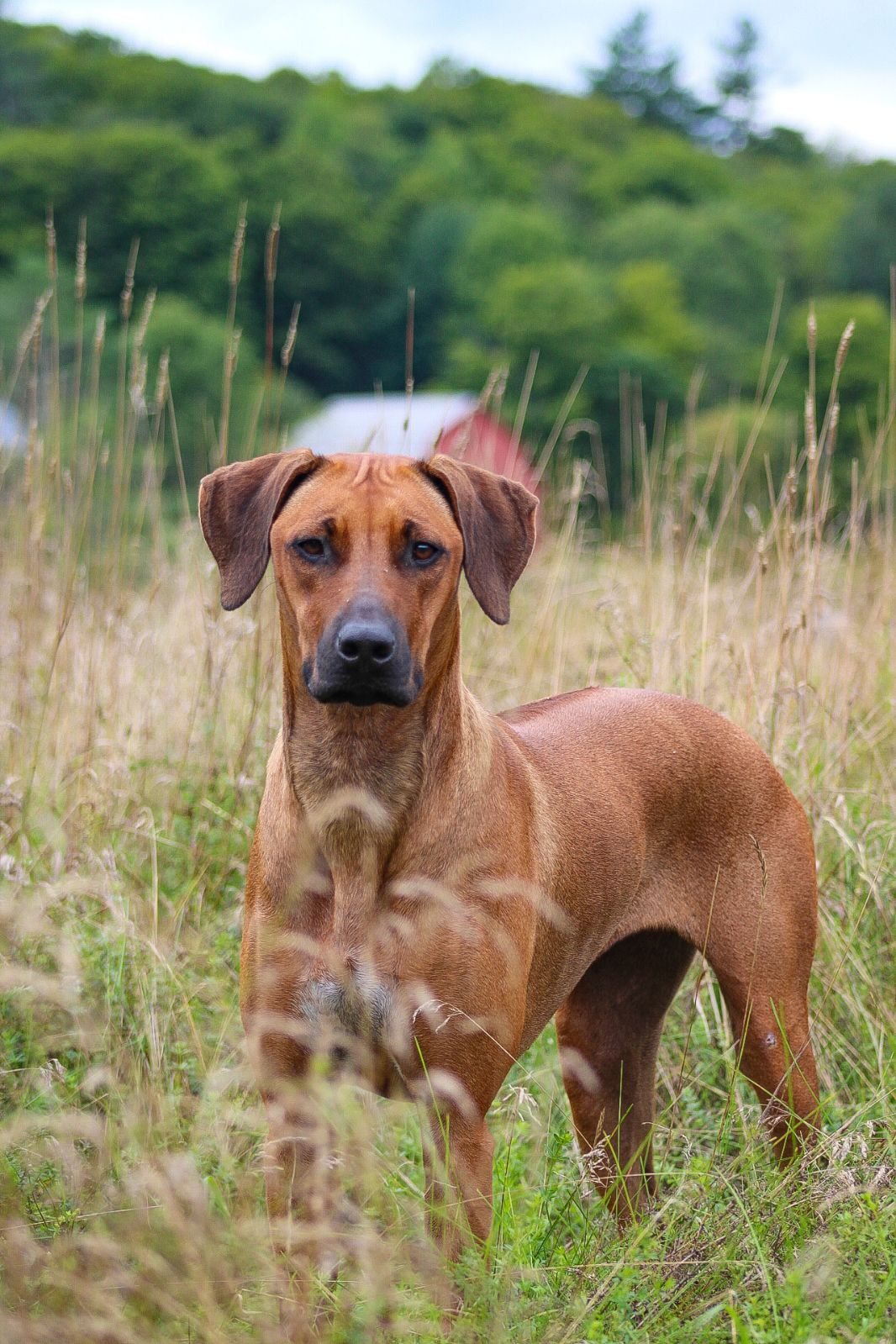
A juvenile Female Rhodesian Ridgeback

The genotype responsible for the ridge was found by a consortium of researchers at the Swedish University of Agricultural Sciences (Nicolette Salmon Hillbertz, Göran Andersson, et al.), Uppsala University (Leif Andersson, Mats Nilsson, et al.) and the Broad Institute (Kerstin Lindblad-Toh, et al.) in 2007.

The only disqualification in the AKC standard for this breed is "ridgelessness". This term refers to the purebred offspring of heterozygous parental animals that do not inherit a copy of the ridge mutation from either parent and thus lack the classic ridged back. The most current research suggests that the ridge mutation is autosomal dominant with near-complete penetrance: 95% of heterozygous dogs have a ridged back. Some purebred Ridgeback puppies are born without a ridge.

The genetic test which distinguishes dominant homozygotes (R/R - two ridge genes) from heterozygotes (R/r - one ridge gene) is available (www.genocan.eu/en). Using the genetic test, a breeder may accurately predict birth of ridgeless puppies.

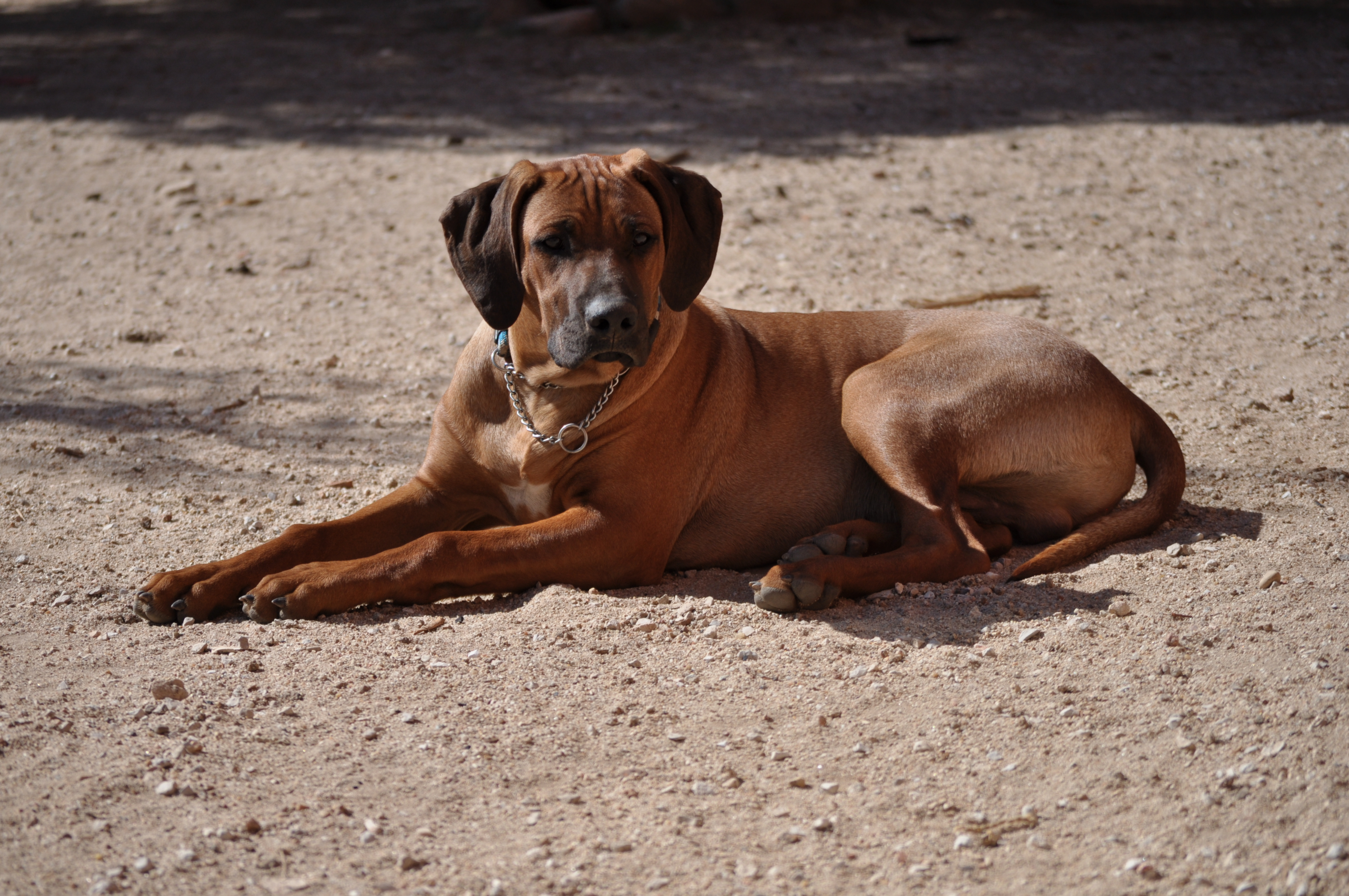

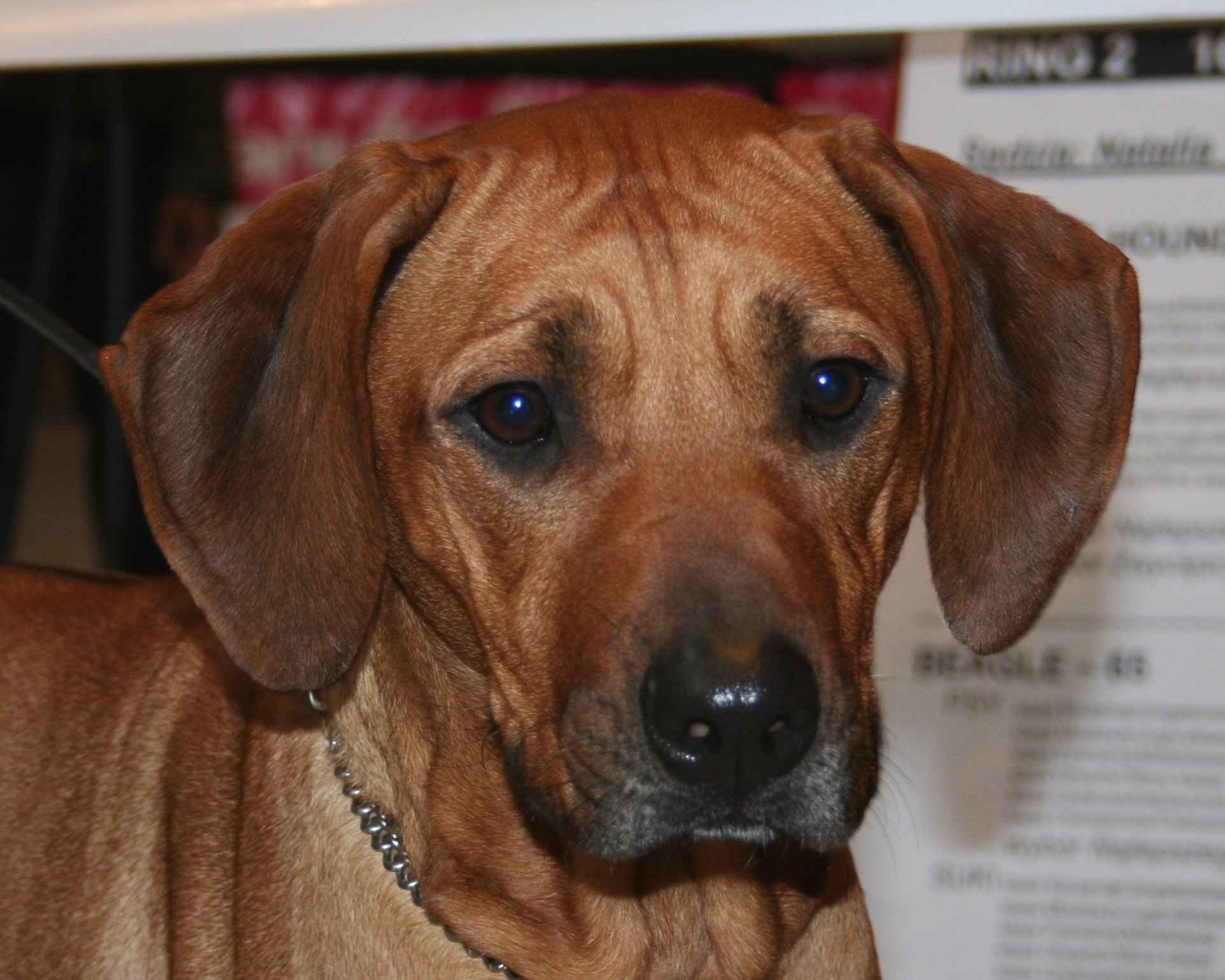

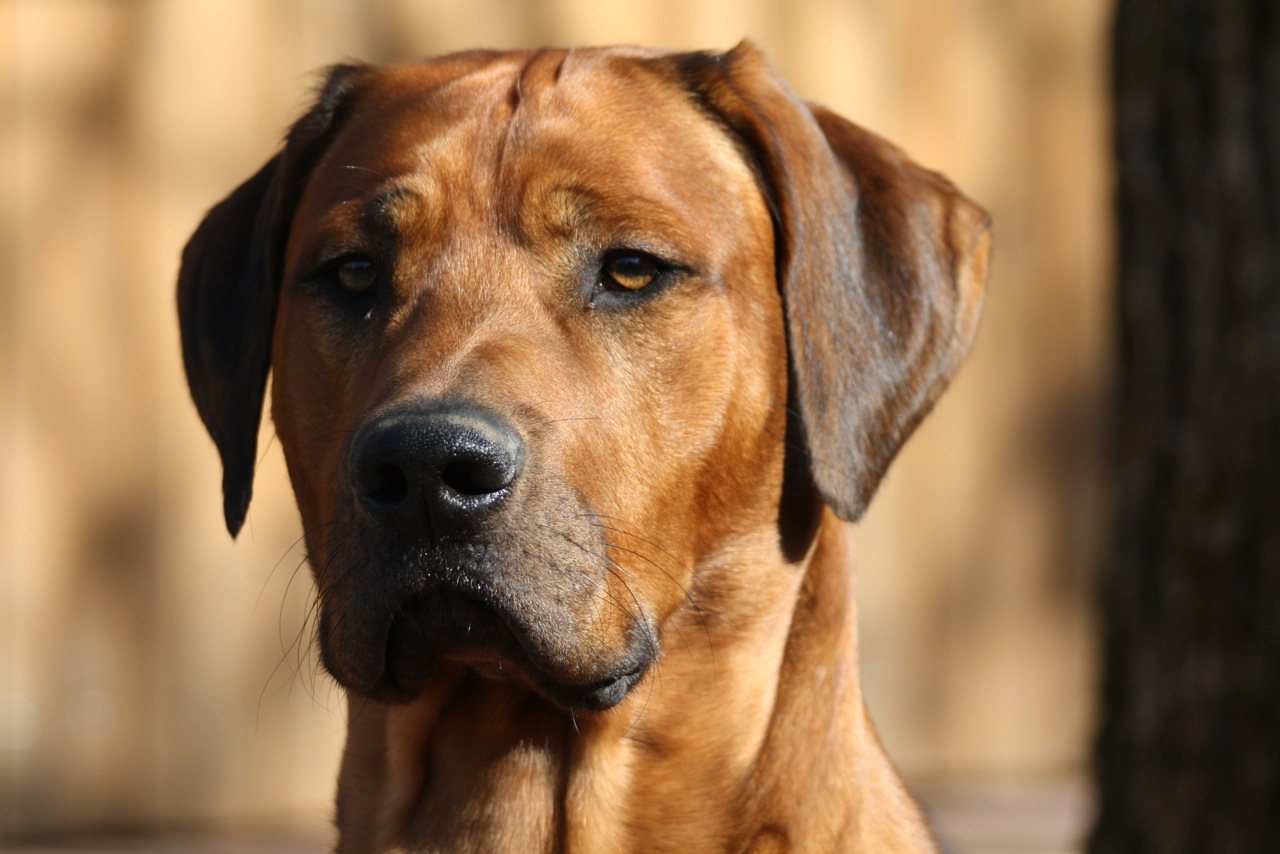

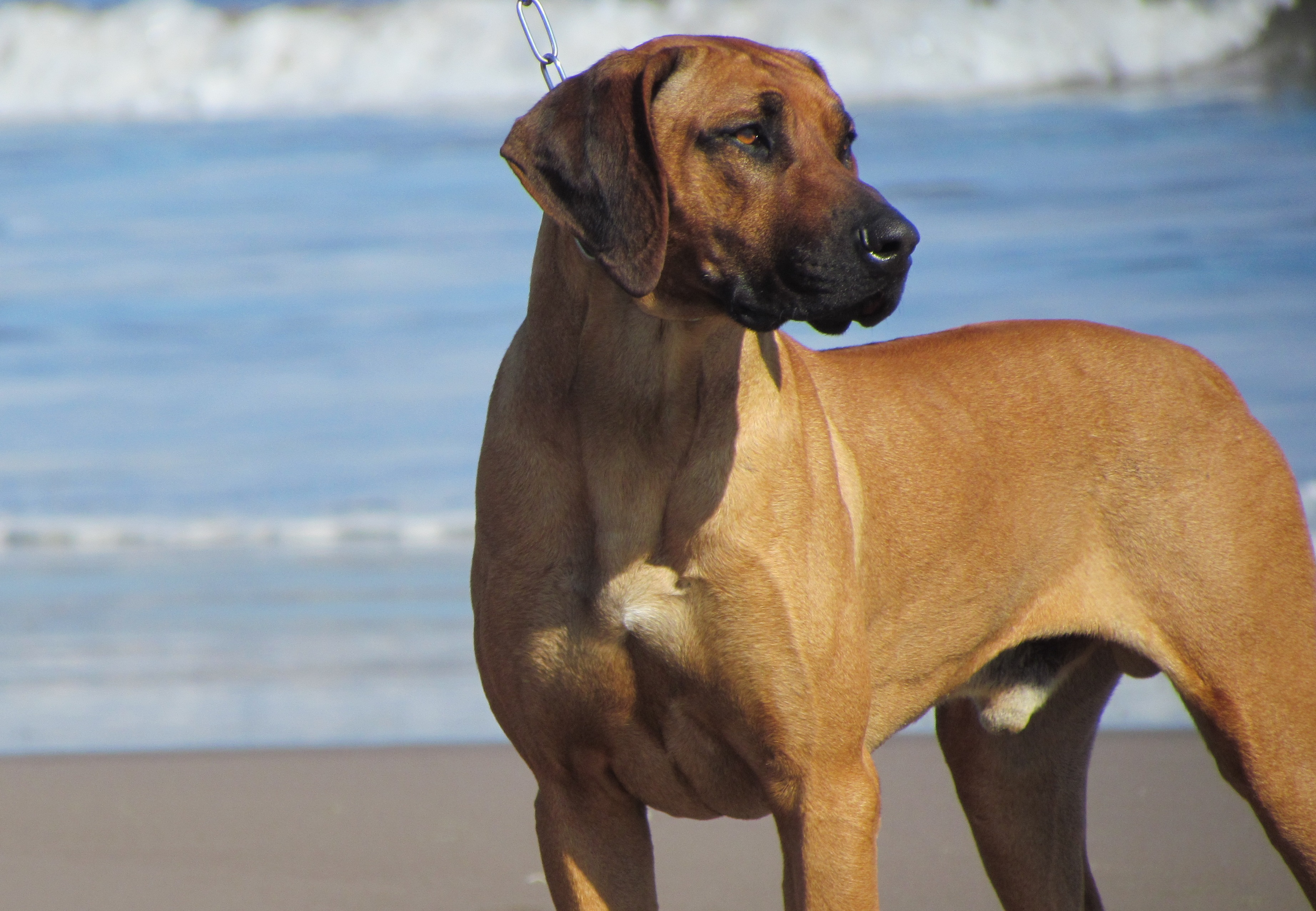

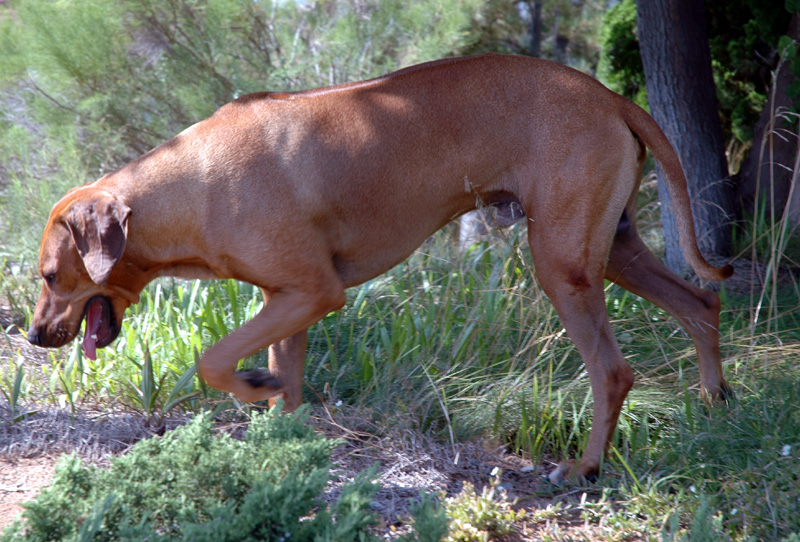
Rhodesian Ridgeback on trail

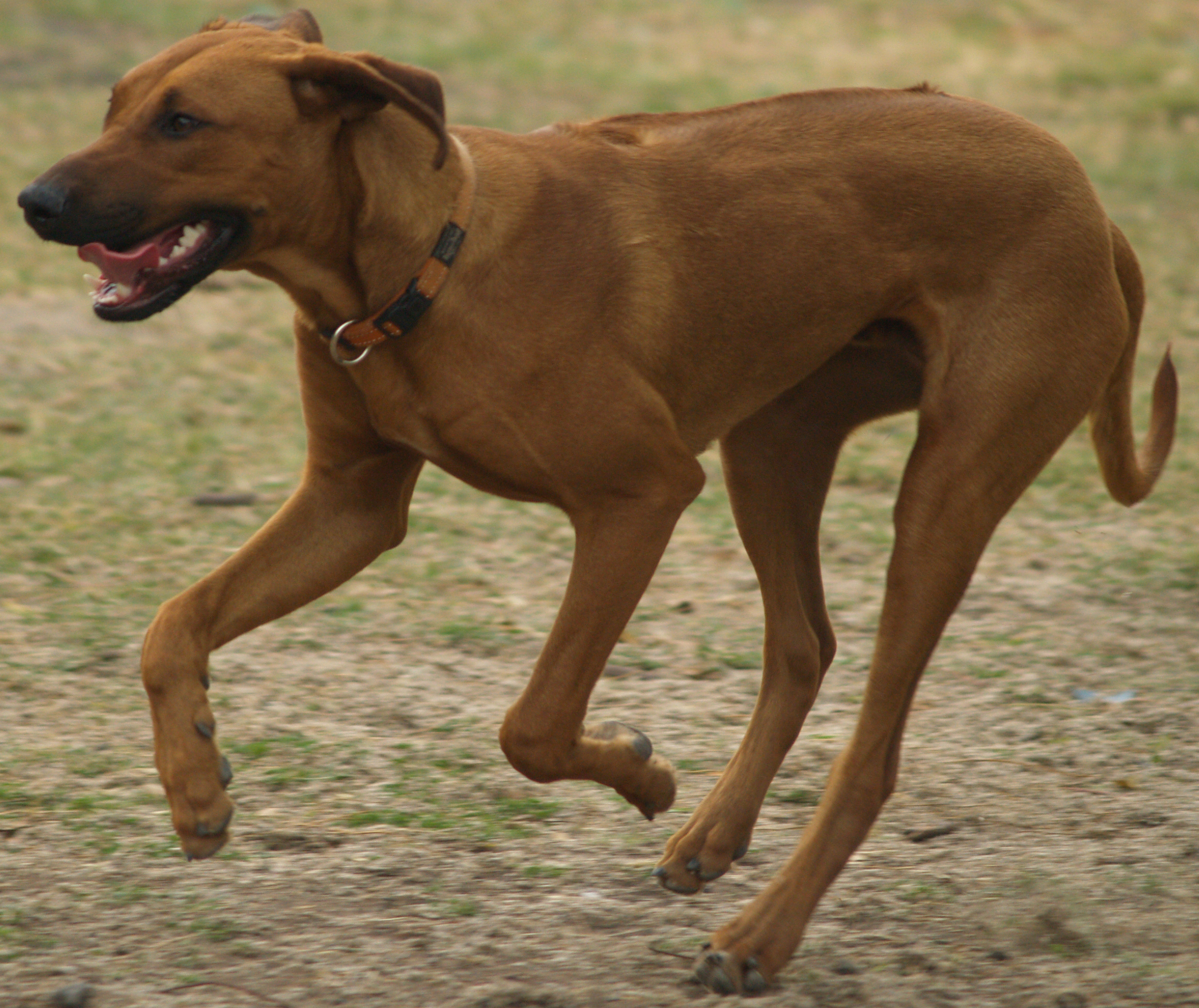
Rhodesian Ridgeback running

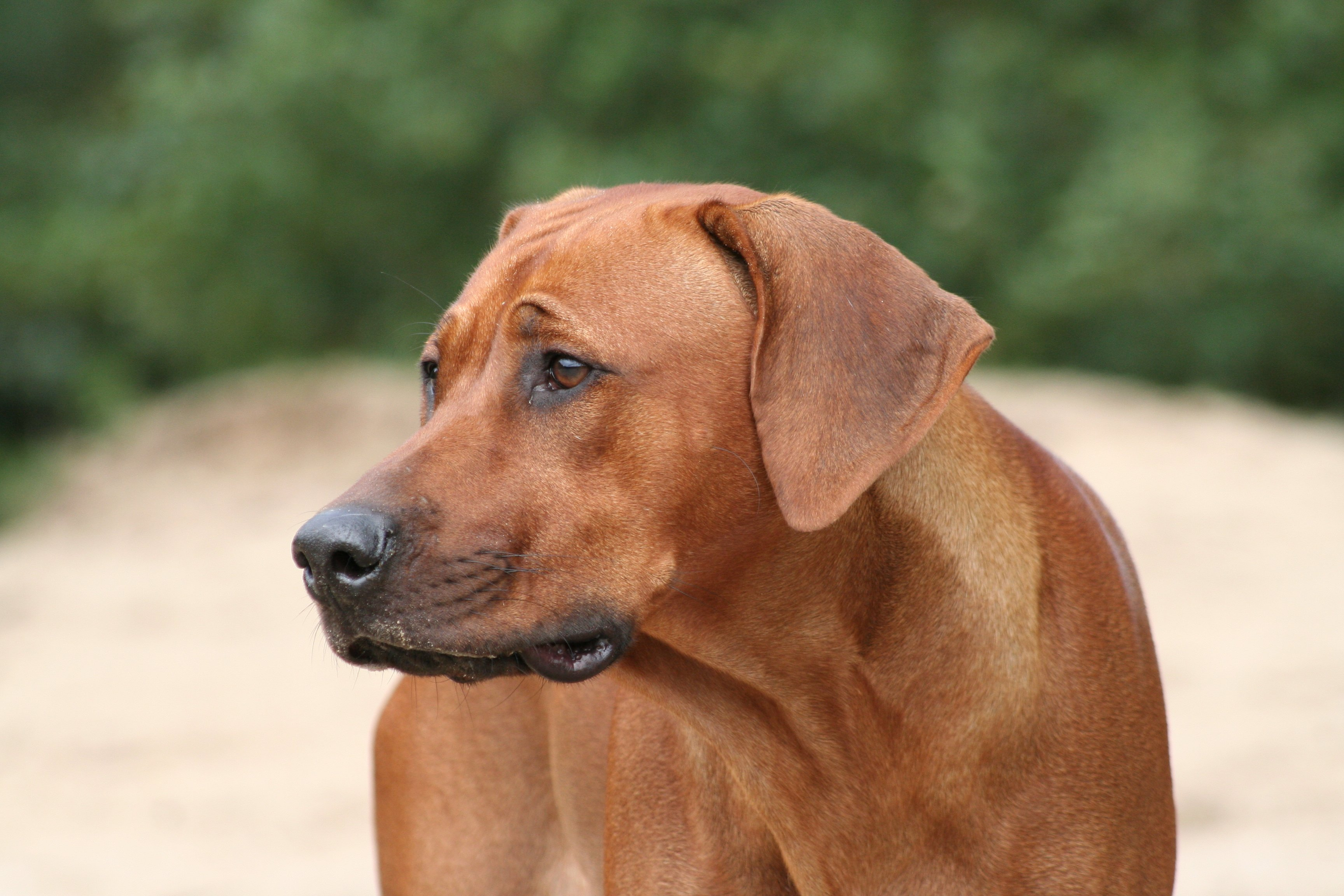
Rhodesian Ridgeback

== Health ==
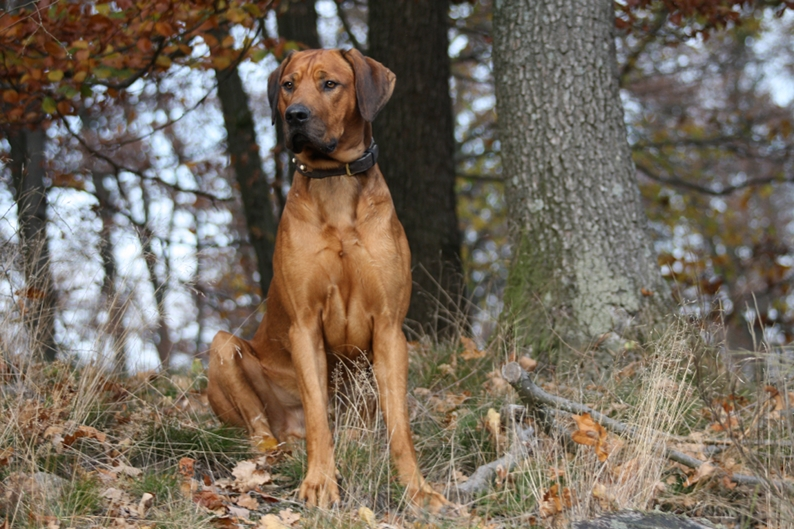
Rhodesian Ridgeback

Health conditions that are known to affect the Rhodesian Ridgeback breed are hip dysplasia and dermoid sinus. The Rhodesian Ridgeback ranks number six in terms of most affected breeds for thyroid problems recorded by the Orthopedic Foundation for Animals. A UK study found the average life expectancy to be 12 years.

=== Dermoid sinus ===
Dermoid sinus is a congenital neural-tube defect that is known to affect this breed. The dermoid is often likened to a thin "spaghetti strand" beneath the skin. Puppies should always be screened at birth by the breeder and veterinarian, and the examination repeated as the puppies grow before they go to their new homes. This is done by palpation of the subcutaneous dorsal midline from the base of the skull to the insertion of the tail. Surgical removal is an option for affected neonates, puppies and adult dogs. All affected dogs, even those surgically corrected, should be spayed or neutered and never be bred, since surgical dermoid sinus removal can be extremely cost prohibitive, and because many unremoved dermoid sinuses will eventually abscess. Abscessed dermoid sinuses will be at best a recurrent, painful problem, and if the sinus communicates with the tissues around the spinal cord, cause meningitis and often death. However, it has been shown that supplementation of folic acid to the diet of the brood bitch before mating and during pregnancy reduces the incidence of dermoid sinus. One study on the Swedish population estimates that 8-10% are affected. Slightly less than 5% of Rhodesian Ridgebacks were reported to be affected with the condition in a US breed club survey.

=== Degenerative myelopathy ===
The Rhodesian Ridgeback is one of the breeds more commonly affected by degenerative myelopathy. The condition is caused by an autosomal recessive mutation in the SOD1 gene.

=== Hypothyroidism ===
Hypothyroidism is a growing problem in the Rhodesian Ridgeback, and this condition causes a multitude of symptoms, including weight gain and hair loss. Treatment for hypothyroidism in dogs consists of an inexpensive once-daily oral medication. Dr. Lorna Kennedy at the University of Manchester's Centre for Integrated Genomic Medical Research in England has found the haplotype (group of genes), which, when present, double the chances of a Rhodesian Ridgeback becoming hypothyroid due to lymphocytic thyroiditis. This is important to the breed because lymphocytic thyroiditis is the overwhelming cause of hypothyroidism in Rhodesian Ridgebacks.

=== Gastric dilatation volvulus ===
Like many other deep-chested breeds, the Rhodesian Ridgeback is prone to gastric dilatation volvulus, commonly known as bloat. This is a potentially fatal condition that requires immediate treatment.

=== Resources ===
RRCUS H&G - the Rhodesian Ridgeback Club of the United States maintains a web site devoted to the breed's health issues that also gathers ongoing research for their Health & Genetics Committee. This group recommends that breeders perform at least four health screenings: hips, elbows, thyroid and eyes, with cardiac and hearing tests optional.

CRRHS - it is also recommended that all ridgeback owners enter their dogs' information in the Comprehensive Rhodesian Ridgeback Health Survey.

== Notable owners ==
- Princess Charlene of Monaco has a Rhodesian Ridgeback named Khan.
- American actor and singer, Patrick Swayze was well-known for his love of the breed.

== See also ==
- List of dog breeds
- Hound
