= Ernest Albert Le Souef =

Australian zoologist

Ernest Albert Le Souef (13 September 1869 – 27 November 1937), sometimes referred to as Col. Le Souef, was an Australian zoologist.

Le Souef was born in Melbourne, the son of Albert Alexander Cochrane Le Souef and Caroline Le Souef, daughter of John Cotton. He was a director at the Perth Zoological Gardens from its foundation in 1898 until 1935.

He retired to and died in Margaret River, Western Australia.
