= Albert Alexander Cochrane Le Souef =

Australian zoologist (1828–1902)

- Born: 17 April 1828
- Died: 7 May 1902 (aged 74)
- Occupation: Zoologist

Albert Alexander Cochrane Le Souef (17 April 1828 – 7 May 1902) was an Australian zoologist.

Le Souef was the director of the Melbourne Zoo from 1882 to 1902. In 1853 he married Caroline, daughter of ornithologist John Cotton. Their sons included the zoologists Ernest Albert Le Souef, Dudley Le Souef and Albert Sherbourne Le Souef. His full title was "Director of the Zoological and Acclimatisation Society of Victoria" and he was the son of William Le Souef of Kent, England, where he was born in 1828.

He was of French descent, his forefathers were exiled Huguenots who sought refuge in England after the revocation of the Edict of Nantes by Louis XIV, in 1685. Leaving their native land for conscience sake, these staunch French Protestants scattered over several counties in England, Mr. Le Souef's ancestors settling in Kent. Although not a native of Victoria, Mr. Le Souef spent nearly the whole of his life in the State, having arrived with his parents in the year 1840, aboard the ship "Eagle".

His education was acquired under private tuition, and in the year 1860 he was engaged in pastoral pursuits. For nearly thirty years, he was an active member of the Victorian Board for the Protection of the Aborigines, and for several years presided over it as its vice-chairman. In 1863, he was appointed Usher of the Black Rod to the Victorian Legislative Council, a position he held for thirty years.

As the duties attendant on that office only occupied about half the year, it was with the cordial assent of the then Chief Secretary, Sir James McCulloch, and the President and members of the Legislative Council, that Mr. Le Souef assumed, in 1870, the honorary secretaryship of the Acclimatisation Society. The name of the society was changed to that of the Zoological and Acclimatisation Society, and from this period the council determined to make their grounds a centre of instruction for the growing population of Melbourne.

On his appointment as hon. secretary in 1870, Mr. Le Souef took up his residence at the Gardens, Royal Park, where he remained until his death in 1902.
