= John Cotton (ornithologist) =

British painter

Platycercus eximius (Eastern Rosella) by John Cotton

John Cotton (17 December 1801 – 14 December 1849) was a British poet, ornithological writer and artist, who became an early pastoral settler in Victoria, Australia.

Cotton was born in Balham, London and educated in Richmond. Afterwards he was articled to a firm of solicitors at Lincoln's Inn for a time, before focusing his interest on art and ornithology. In 1829 he became a Fellow of the Zoological Society of London. In 1835 he published privately The Resident Song Birds of Great Britain, with 17 colour plates and descriptive text, as well as The Song Birds of Great Britain, with 16 pages in colour.

In 1843 Cotton migrated with his family (comprising his wife Susanna and nine children) to the Port Phillip District of New South Wales in Australia, now better known as the state of Victoria. Following his arrival in Melbourne he leased from the government two pastoral properties on the Goulburn River where he farmed sheep. In 1847 Susanna gave birth to their tenth child and sixth daughter.

From 1844 Cotton was preparing sketches for a book to be named Birds of Port Phillip, as well as accumulating a collection of bird skins. However, circumstances were against him; John Gould's monumental illustrated handbook The Birds of Australia, issued in seven volumes from 1840 to 1848, was dominating the potential market for Cotton's intended publication, and there was little interest in, or appreciation for, his paintings. Moreover, he died in 1849, at age 47, his wife dying three years later, and his artwork remained unpublished, scattered among his descendants and largely lost to the world for the next 120 years.

In 1974 a limited-edition book, John Cotton's Birds of the Port Phillip District of New South Wales 1843-1849, authored by Allan McEvey was published, containing reproductions of some of the illustrations Cotton had prepared for the book that never eventuated. In it McEvey concludes his account of Cotton's life with:

"But apart from his historical position, apart from his records of value, he was to have a continuing if indirect link with Australian ornithology through the marriages of his children. A grandson-in-law, W.H.D. Le Souef (1857–1923) was to be a founder of the Royal Australasian Ornithologists' Union and its fourth President; another, Colonel Sir Charles Ryan (1853–1926) was its third President; a grand-daughter, Mrs Ellis Rowan, was to attain renown for her flower and bird painting; and a great-grand-daughter, Maie Ryan, as Her Excellency the Lady Casey, was to declare open the 67th R.A.O.U. Congress at Canberra in 1968, and now, at last, to achieve for John Cotton the publication of these selected drawings from his Birds of Port Phillip.

Gentle, sensitive, artistic, and educated in the age of the Grand Tour, John Cotton was a man of the time not an innovator; in natural history a compiler and painter rather than a chronicler. In ornithology his capacity and ambition to be more than a naturalist in Colonial solitude were hampered by distance, impoverished by lack of encouragement, and ended with his early death.

He had been trained however to appreciate a quality of life and he remained true to himself and to that spirit of his age. As shown by numerous entries and sketches in his journals he loved Antiquity no less than Nature. In his own words, in one of his lines of poetry, 'Sweet [was] the retrospect of classic lore.' In this, one hopes, there lay a solace for him."

His daughter, Caroline (1834–1915), married zoologist Albert Alexander Cochrane Le Souef.

== Bibliography ==
- The Song Birds of Great Britain 1835, London
- Sketchbook belonging to John Cotton, with sketches and descriptions of birds of the Port Phillip District of New South Wales, 1844-1849, manuscript
