= Caroline Le Souef =

English-born Australian artist

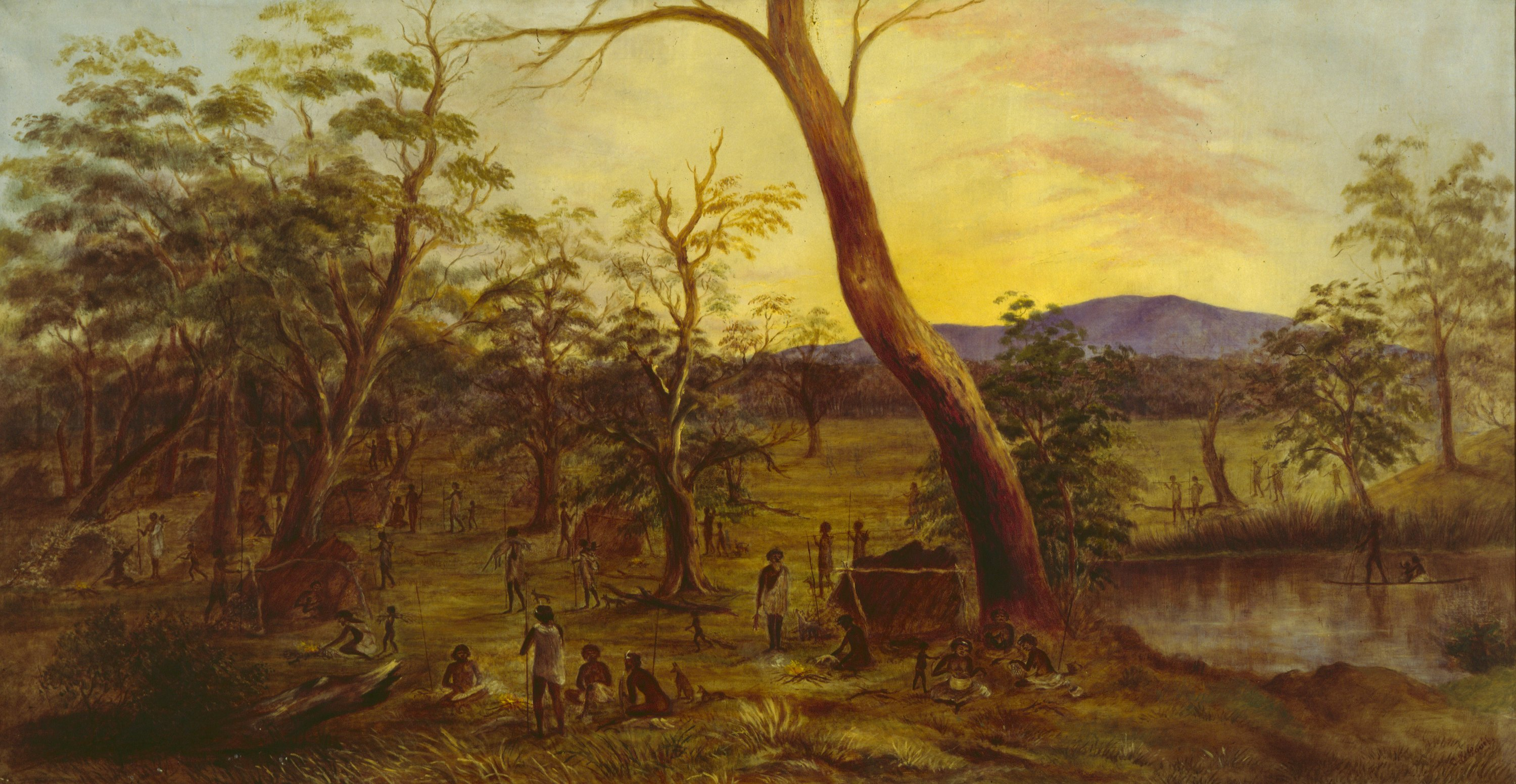
- Home Life of the Victorian Aborigines, 1895
- Born: 15 July 1834; Barnstaple, Devon
- Died: 6 March 1915 (aged 80); Royal Park, Victoria
- Resting place: Melbourne General Cemetery, Melbourne, Victoria, Australia
- Spouse(s): Albert Alexander Cochrane Le Souëf, 1853–1902 (his death)
- Children: 4 sons, 5 daughters

Caroline Le Souef (15 July 1834 – 6 March 1915) was an Australian artist who was born in England in 1834 to John Cotton. As a child, she migrated to Australia with her family in 1843, living in Goulburn River Valley, and was educated in Melbourne, Victoria. She married Albert Alexander Cochrane Le Souëf in 1853. Caroline would provide sketches and artworks to complement the work of Albert Le Souef during their time in the Goulburn River Valley when the treatment of Aboriginal people was conducted under a Protectorat, with Albert taking an active role. Albert and Caroline would document the customs of the local Aboriginal people during this time.

After Albert was appointed foundation director of the Melbourne Zoological Gardens in 1880, the pair toured Europe, and she has a number of sketches attributed to the collection of specimens around this time. Later in life, Le Souef made a series of oil paintings depicting Aboriginal life.

Her husband predeceased her in 1902. She died in 1915 and is buried in Melbourne General Cemetery. Her grave is listed as a notable figure in the cemetery.
