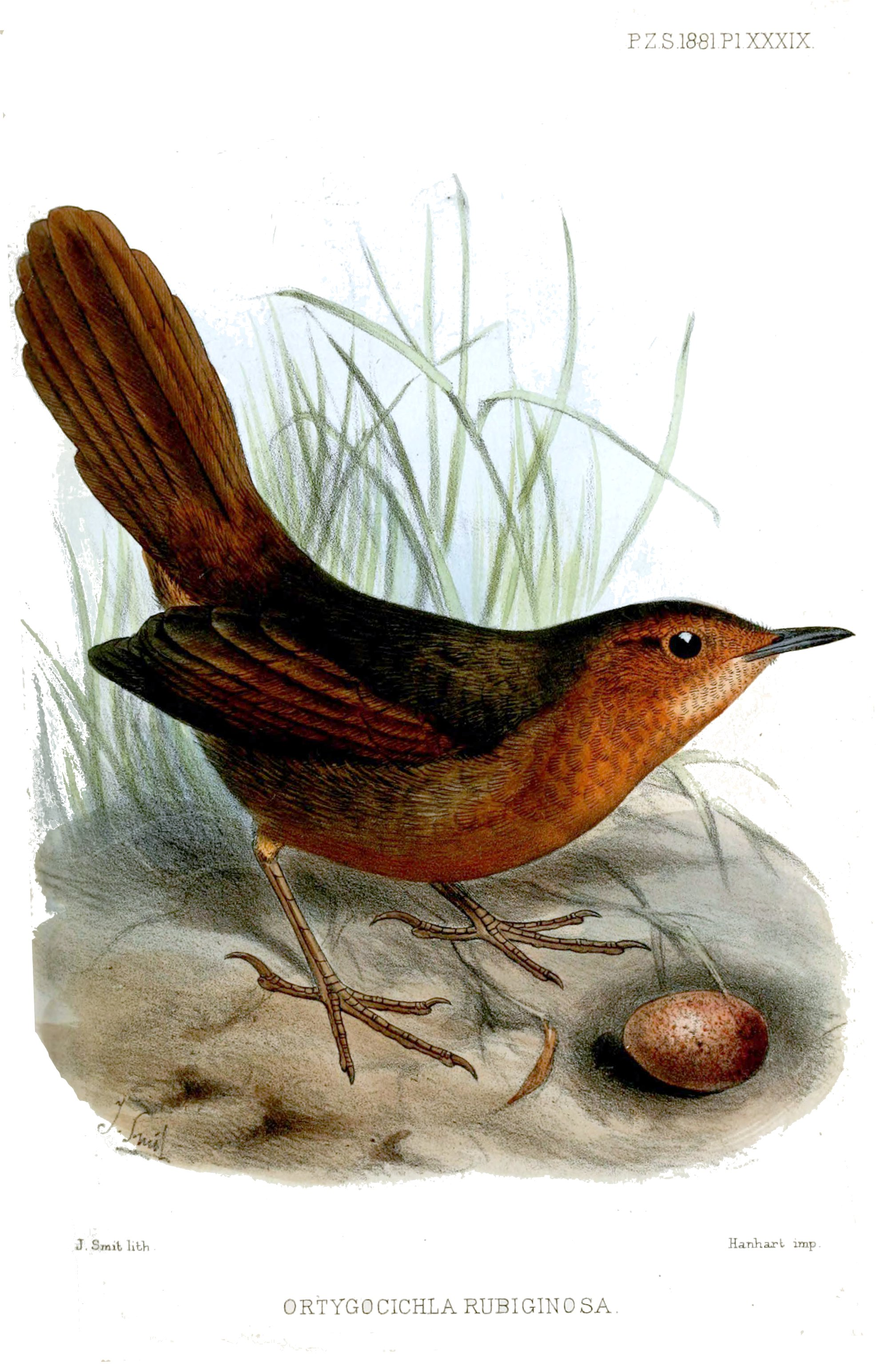
- Rusty thicketbird (Cincloramphus rubiginosus)

Scientific classification
- Kingdom: Animalia
- Phylum: Chordata
- Class: Aves
- Order: Passeriformes
- Family: Locustellidae
- Genus: Cincloramphus

Species
- See text

= Thicketbird =

Group of birds

The thicketbirds are a group of birds in the family Locustellidae. Most taxonomists place them together with the songlarks in the genus Cincloramphus. They are alternatively placed in the genus Megalurus.

There are seven species:

- Rusty thicketbird (Cincloramphus rubiginosus)
- New Britain thicketbird (Cincloramphus grosvenori)
- Buff-banded thicketbird (Cincloramphus bivittatus)
- Santo thicketbird (Cincloramphus whitneyi)
- New Caledonian thicketbird (Cincloramphus mariae)
- Long-legged thicketbird (Cincloramphus rufus)
- Bougainville thicketbird (Cincloramphus llaneae)
- Guadalcanal thicketbird (Cincloramphus turipavae)
