= Grassbird =

Grassbird may refer to:

- Bristled grassbird (Chaetornis striata), a passerine bird making up the monotypic genus Chaetornis
- One of two species of grassbird in the genus Schoenicola:
  - Broad-tailed grassbird (Schoenicola platyurus)
  - Fan-tailed grassbird (Schoenicola brevirostris)
- Cape grassbird (Sphenoeacus afer), an African warbler, formerly placed in the family Sylviidae
- Rufous-rumped grassbird (Graminicola bengalensis), a species of babbler in a monotypic genus in the family Timaliidae:
- Two species of grassbird in the genus Poodytes:
  - Fly River grassbird (Poodytes albolimbatus)
  - Little grassbird (Poodytes gramineus)
- One species of grassbird in the genus Helopsaltes:
  - Marsh grassbird (Helopsaltes pryeri)
- Two species of grassbird in the genus Cincloramphus:
  - Papuan grassbird (Cincloramphus macrurus)
  - Tawny grassbird (Cincloramphus timoriensis)
- One species of grassbird in the genus Megalurus:
  - Striated grassbird (Megalurus palustris)
- The Grey emutail (Bradypterus seebohmi) is also known as the Madagascan grassbird
