= Bowdleria =

Bowdleria is now considered a former genus once identifying the two species of fernbird. Most taxonomists consider them to now be placed in the genus Poodytes:

- New Zealand fernbird, Bowdleria punctata
- Chatham fernbird, Bowdleria rufescens
