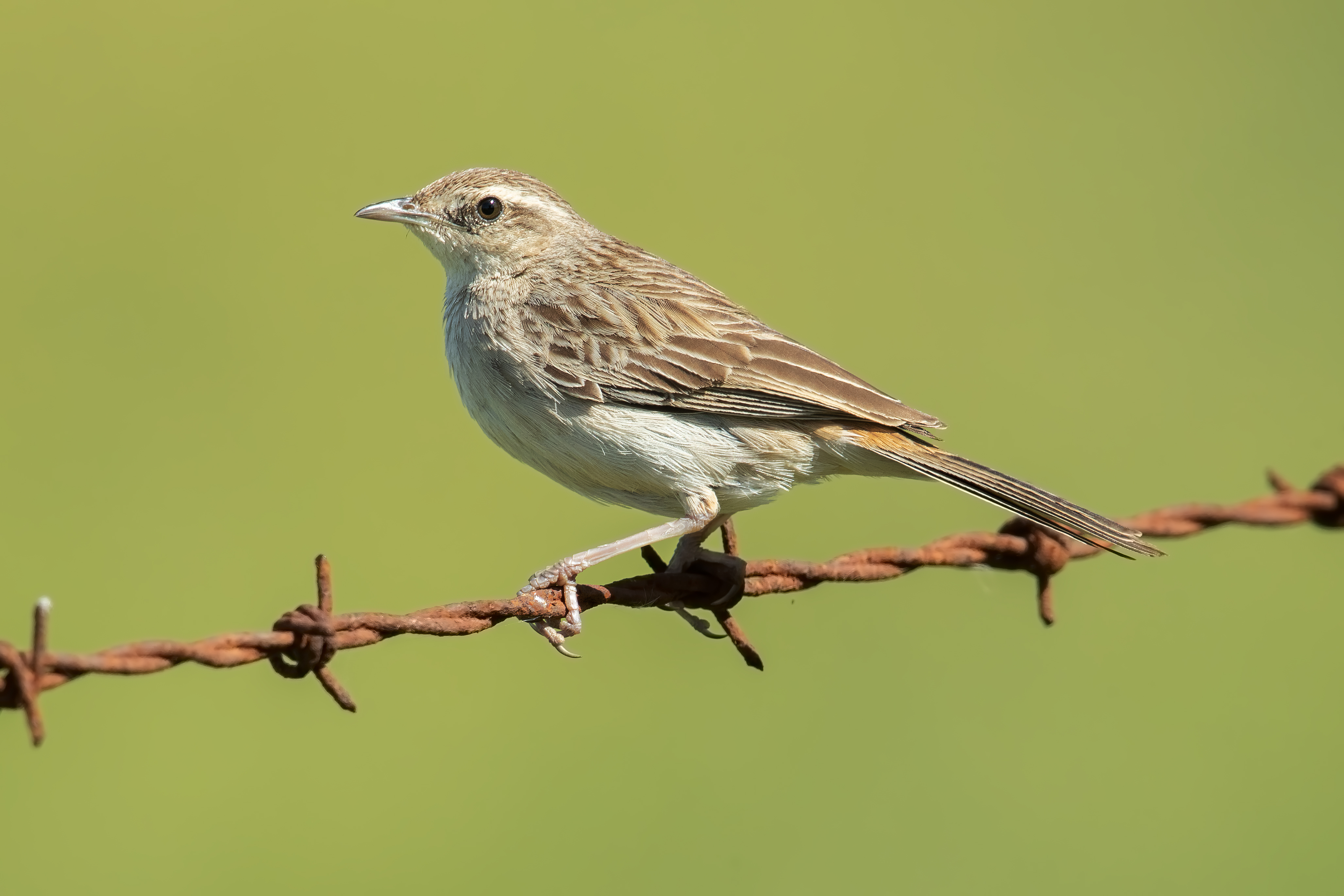
- At Bushell's Lagoon, New South Wales, Australia

Conservation status
- Least Concern (IUCN 3.1)

Scientific classification
- Kingdom: Animalia
- Phylum: Chordata
- Class: Aves
- Order: Passeriformes
- Family: Locustellidae
- Genus: Cincloramphus
- Species: C. mathewsi

Binomial name
- Cincloramphus mathewsi Iredale, 1911

Synonyms
- Megalurus mathewsi

= Rufous songlark =

Species of bird

The rufous songlark (Cincloramphus mathewsi) is a species in the family Locustellidae endemic to Australia.

== Taxonomy ==
It is a species of Locustellidae, which includes the grass warblers and grassbirds.

The rufous songlark was described by English ornithologist Tom Iredale in 1911. An alternative generic name Cincloramphus is derived from Greek words cinclus/κιγκλος "wagtail" and ramphos/ραμφος "beak", while the specific epithet honours Gregory Mathews.

As well as rufous songlark, other common names include red-rumped songlark, rufous singing lark, and skylark.

== Description ==
The rufous songlark is a medium brown passerine songbird with a pattern of streaks on its feathers. Encyclopædia Britannica describes this bird as "drab and vaguely larklike". It has a dark line through its eye, a pale eyebrow and pale underparts, and a rufous upper tail and rump. A little larger than a house sparrow, the male grows to about 19 cm (7.5 in) in length and is larger than the female which reaches only about 16 cm (6.3 in).

This species is similar to the brown songlark but males of that species are much larger than those of the rufous songlark. Brown songlark females also lack the rufous rump of the female rufous songlark.

== Distribution and habitat ==
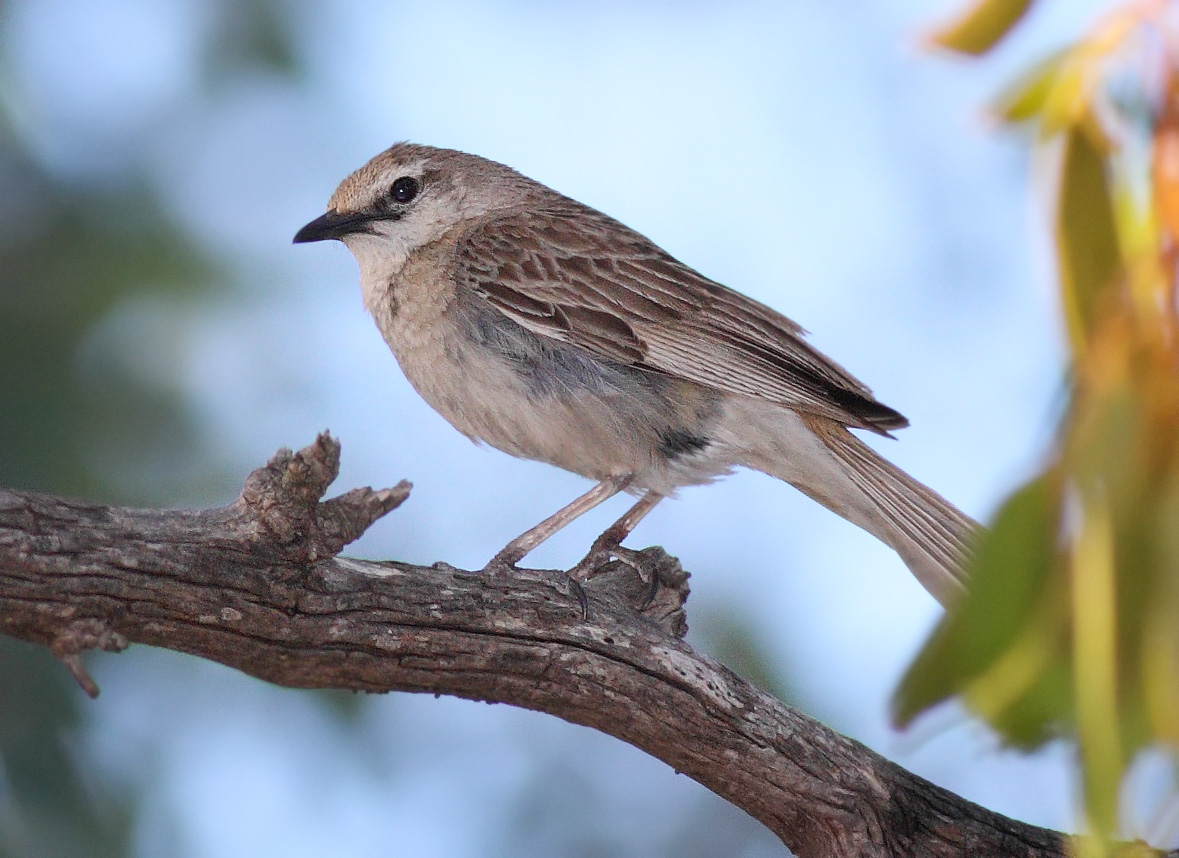
Rufous songlark in Victoria

The rufous songlark is common all over mainland Australia, but is uncommon in the northern Top End of the Northern Territory and rare on the island of Tasmania. The overall range of the songlark is thought to be in the order of between 1,000,000 and 10,000,000 km^{2}. C. mathewsi is most often found in New South Wales, Queensland, and Western Australia. Each year the rufous songlark spends colder months in the north and migrates south in the summer to breed, and in this way it is typically seen only in the warmer months because the south is more densely populated by people.

== Behaviour ==
The rufous songlark hunts close to the ground for the insects and other small arthropods upon which it feeds. The bird can be found in grasslands, grassy open woodlands, agricultural areas, and mulga that it favors as a habitat. Living in areas populated by humans, it sometimes ends up as road kill.

Outside the breeding period these birds form small flocks of up to two dozen individuals. In the breeding season the lively, unmistakable song of the male rufous songlark is heard almost continuously. He chirps and curves his back while going on slow, showy "display flights" between trees. The distinctive "twitchy tweedle" song of the rufous songlark has been included on CDs of "Favourite Australian Birdsong". Without help from the male, the female bird builds a deep nest of grass sheltered amid grass or low vegetation. She also incubates the eggs and raises the fledglings herself.

== Video file ==
Pikedale, S Queensland, Australia

== Bibliography ==
- Goodfellow, D.L.; Stott, M. (2001). Birds of Australia's Top End (2005 ed.). Scrubfowl Press.
- Serventy, V.N., ed. (1982). The Wrens and Warblers of Australia. Sydney: Angus and Robertson and the National Photographic Index of Australian Wildlife.
- Morcombe, M. (2000). Field guide to Australian Birds. Steve Parish Publishing.
- Simpson, K. and Day, N. (1999). Field guide to the birds of Australia (6th ed.). Penguin Books, Australia.
- Higgins, P.J.; Peter, J.M.; and Cowling, S.J., eds. (2006). Handbook of Australian, New Zealand and Antarctic Birds. Vol. 7 (Dunnock to Starlings) Part B. Melbourne: Oxford University Press.
