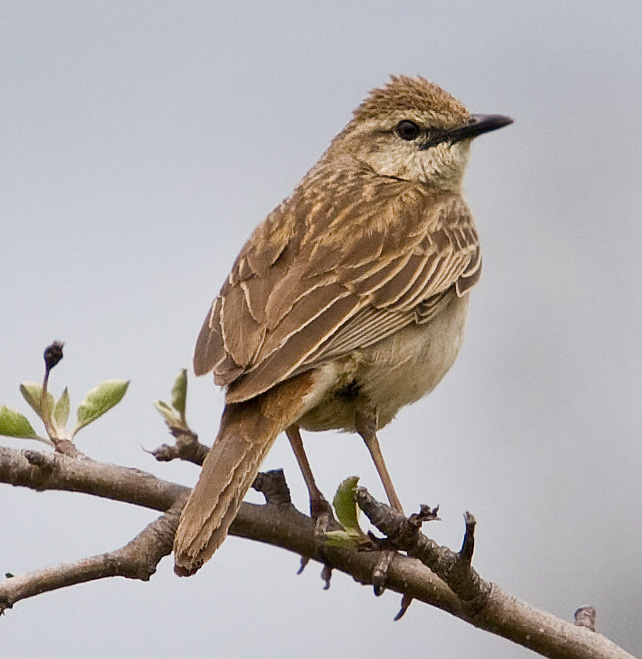
- Rufous songlark (Cincloramphus mathewsi)

Scientific classification
- Kingdom: Animalia
- Phylum: Chordata
- Class: Aves
- Order: Passeriformes
- Family: Locustellidae
- Genus: Cincloramphus

Species
- Cincloramphus cruralis; Cincloramphus mathewsi

= Songlark =

Songlarks

Group of birds

The songlarks are a pair of species of birds in the family Locustellidae. Most taxonomists place them together with the thicketbirds in the genus Cincloramphus. They are alternatively placed in the genus Megalurus.

There are two species:

- Brown songlark (Cincloramphus cruralis)
- Rufous songlark (Cincloramphus mathewsi)

Both are endemic to Australia.
