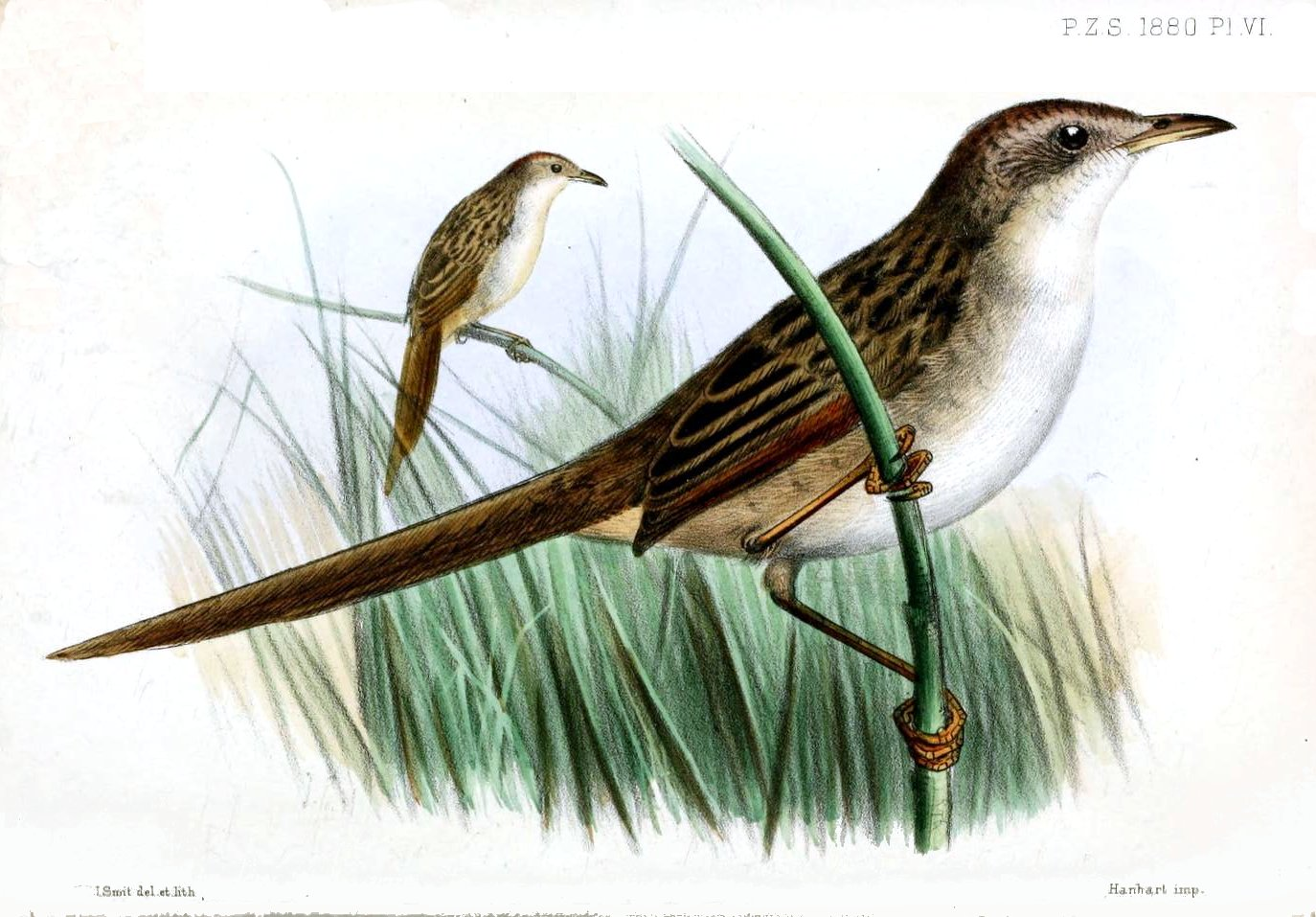
- Illustration by Joseph Smit (1880)
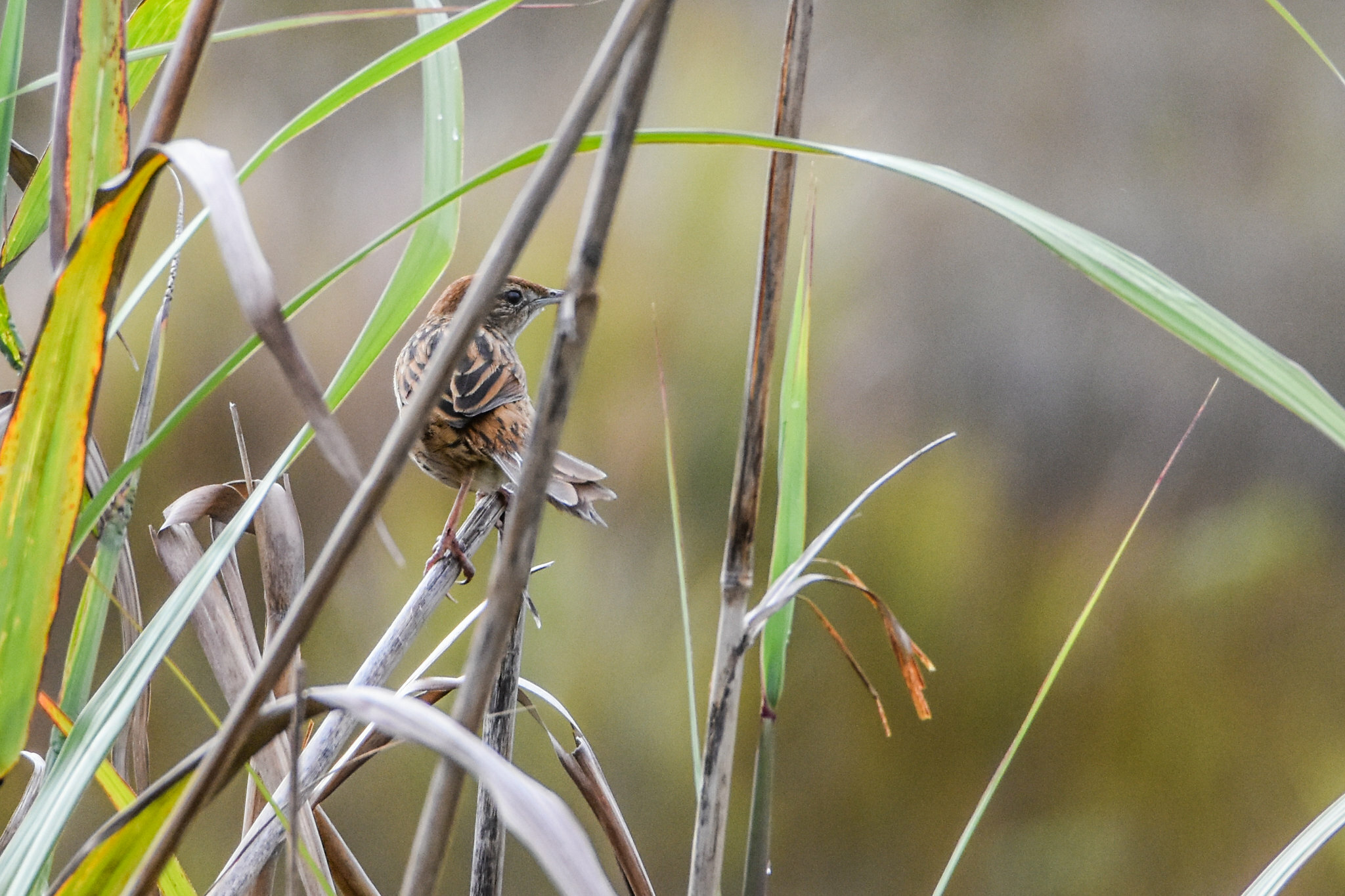

Conservation status
- Least Concern (IUCN 3.1)

Scientific classification
- Kingdom: Animalia
- Phylum: Chordata
- Class: Aves
- Order: Passeriformes
- Family: Locustellidae
- Genus: Cincloramphus
- Species: C. macrurus

Binomial name
- Cincloramphus macrurus (Salvadori, 1876)

Synonyms
- Megalurus macrurus

= Papuan grassbird =

Species of bird

The Papuan grassbird (Cincloramphus macrurus) is a species of typical grassbird in the family Locustellidae. The species was once treated as several subspecies of the tawny grassbird, but the two do not interbreed where their ranges are sympatric. The species is endemic to New Guinea and its satellite islands. There are seven subspecies ranging across montane areas of New Guinea, New Britain and New Ireland. It is a fairly large typical grassbird, 20–23 cm (7.9–9.1 in) long and weighing 40 g (1.4 oz).
