= Guadalcanal thicketbird =

Scientific classification
- Kingdom: Animalia
- Phylum: Chordata
- Class: Aves
- Order: Passeriformes
- Family: Locustellidae
- Genus: Cincloramphus
- Species: C. turipavae

Binomial name
- Cincloramphus turipavae (Cain & Galbraith, ICJ, 1955)

Species of bird

The Guadalcanal thicketbird (Cincloramphus turipavae) is a bird species. It used to be placed in the "Old World warbler" family Sylviidae, but it does not seem to be a close relative of the typical warblers; it belongs in the grass warbler family, Locustellidae. It is found on the island of Guadalcanal in the Solomon Islands.

Its natural habitats are subtropical or tropical moist lowland forest and subtropical or tropical moist montane forest.

It was formerly considered to be conspecific with the Santo thicketbird (Cincloramphus whitneyi).
