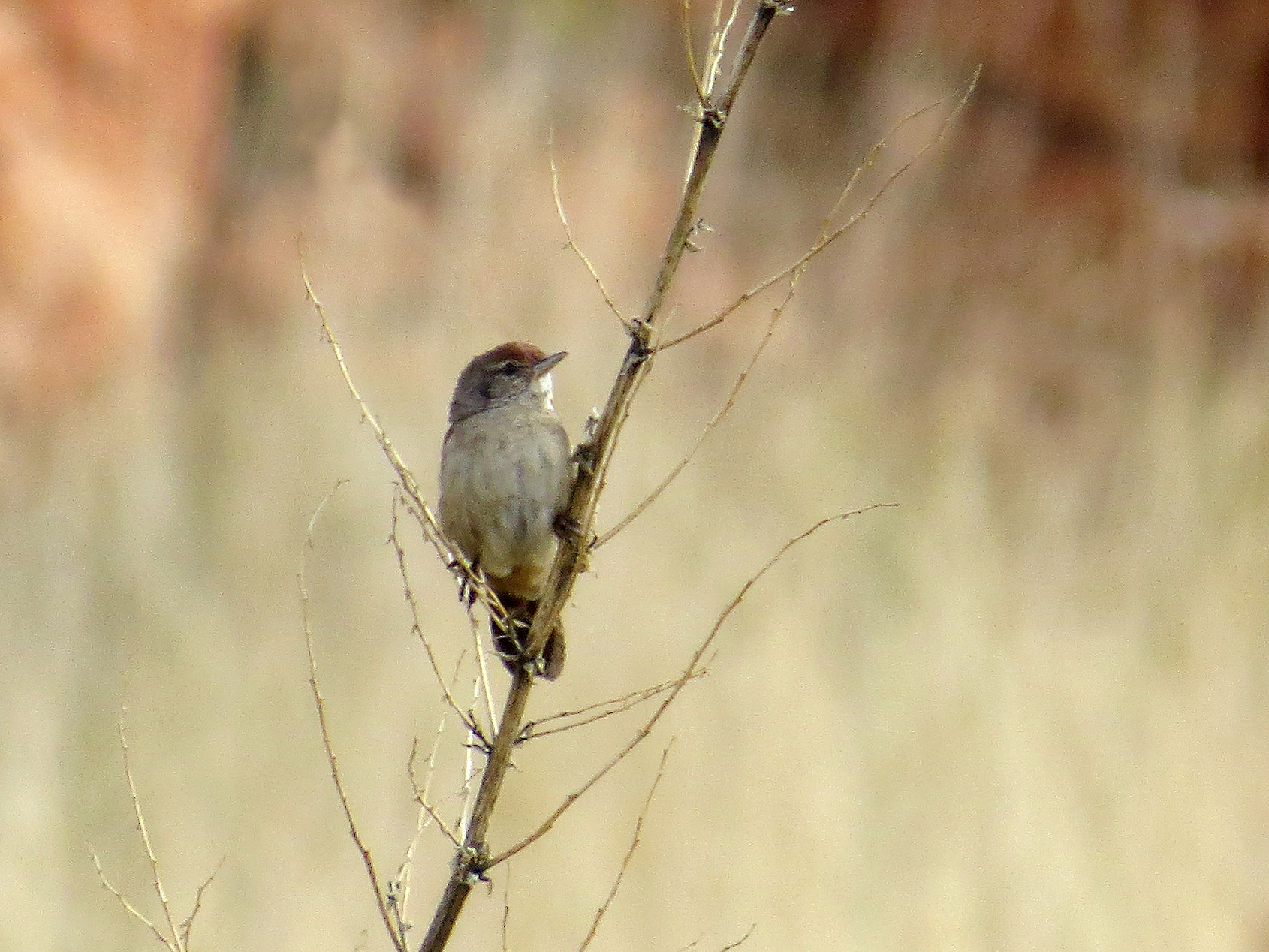

Conservation status
- Least Concern (IUCN 3.1)

Scientific classification
- Kingdom: Animalia
- Phylum: Chordata
- Class: Aves
- Order: Passeriformes
- Family: Locustellidae
- Genus: Poodytes
- Species: P. carteri

Binomial name
- Poodytes carteri (North, 1900)

Synonyms
- Eremiornis carteri Megalurus carteri

= Spinifexbird =

Species of bird

The spinifexbird (Poodytes carteri) is endemic to inland Australia. Also known as Carter's desertbird, it is named after Thomas Carter, an English ornithologist and pastoralist active in Western Australia from 1887 to 1928.

== Description ==
It has a rich brown cap, golden brown streaked wings, and a long tail. Both sexes are alike.

== Behaviour ==
Its diet comprises a variety of insects and seeds collected in "spinifex" or Triodia grass. This species flies weakly, with its tail drooping. It tends to be solitary and sedentary. The breeding season of the spinifexbird stretches from August to November. Its nest is a shallow cup built in clumps of Triodia grass close to the ground, usually with a clutch of two eggs. Not globally threatened, the species may be common in suitable habitats, although it is rarely seen due to the remote and arid nature of its habitat.
