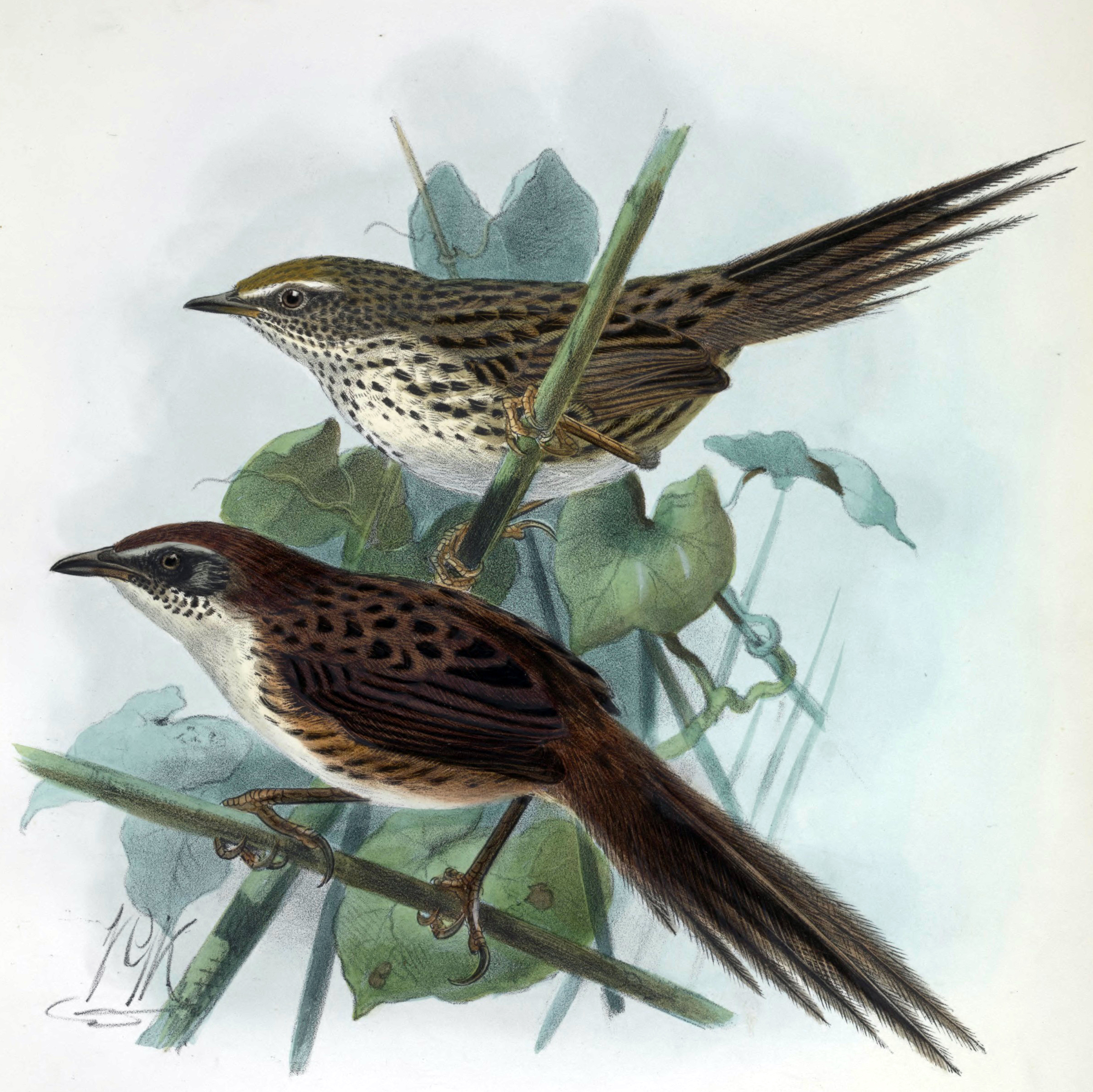
- Chatham fernbird below

Conservation status
- Extinct (1900) (IUCN 3.1)

Scientific classification
- Kingdom: Animalia
- Phylum: Chordata
- Class: Aves
- Order: Passeriformes
- Family: Locustellidae
- Genus: Poodytes
- Species: †P. rufescens

Binomial name
- †Poodytes rufescens (Buller, 1869)
- Original distribution on a map of the Chatham Islands

Synonyms
- Bowdleria rufescens Megalurus rufescens

= Chatham Islands fernbird =

Extinct species of bird

The Chatham Islands fernbird (Poodytes rufescens) is an extinct bird species that was endemic to the Chatham Islands. It was historically known only from Mangere Island, but fossils have been found on Pitt Island and Chatham Island as well. Its closest living relative is the New Zealand fernbird or matata (Poodytes punctatus). It was formerly treated as a subspecies of the New Zealand fernbird, but is now widely recognized as its own species. Both fernbirds were formerly placed in their own genus Bowdleria; they were later moved to Megalurus and most recently Poodytes.

== Description ==
The Chatham Islands fernbird reached a length of 18 cm. Its wings were 5.9 to 6.7 cm. In contrast to the New Zealand fernbird, it had unspotted white underparts, a chestnut-brown crown, a distinct white loral spot, and a dark red-brown back. It was insectivorous but nothing more is known about its ecology.

== Extinction ==
The first individual known to science was collected in 1868 by New Zealand naturalist Charles Traill on Mangere Island by "knocking it over with a stone". He sent it to Sir Walter Buller, who described it as a new species in 1869. In 1871 the population was described as rather common on Mangere but reduced on Pitt Island. The reasons for its extinction were apparently brush fires, overgrazing by goats and rabbits and predation by rats and feral cats. The last specimen was shot for the collection of Lionel Walter Rothschild in 1895 shortly after the introduction of cats to Mangere Island, and it was regarded as extinct by 1900.

Museum specimens can be seen in the Auckland War Memorial Museum, in the Harvard Museum of Natural History, Berlin, Chicago, Christchurch, in the Natural History Museum, in the World Museum, Liverpool, in the American Museum of Natural History, in Paris, Pittsburgh and Stockholm.

== Gallery ==
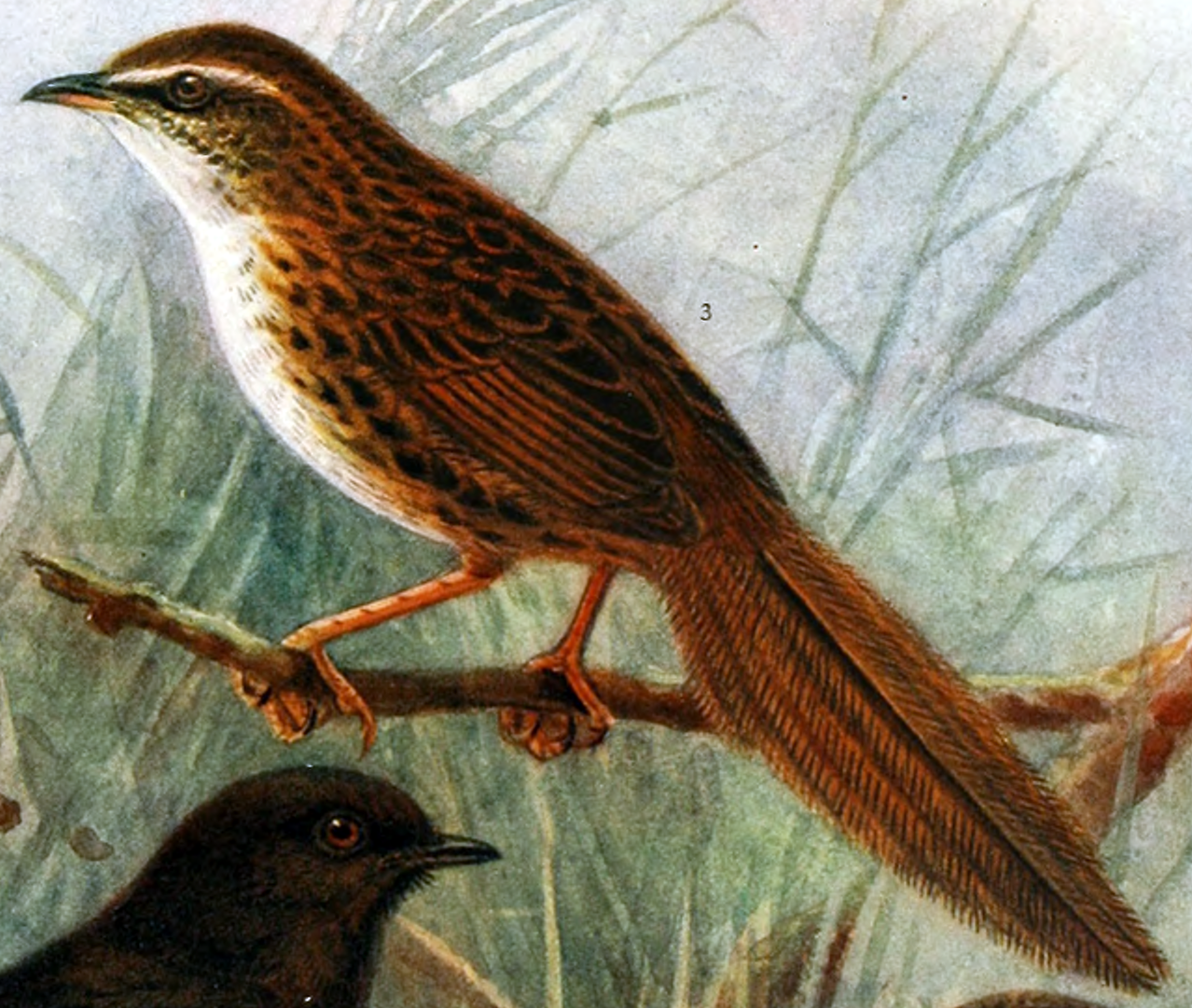
Chatham fernbird (above)

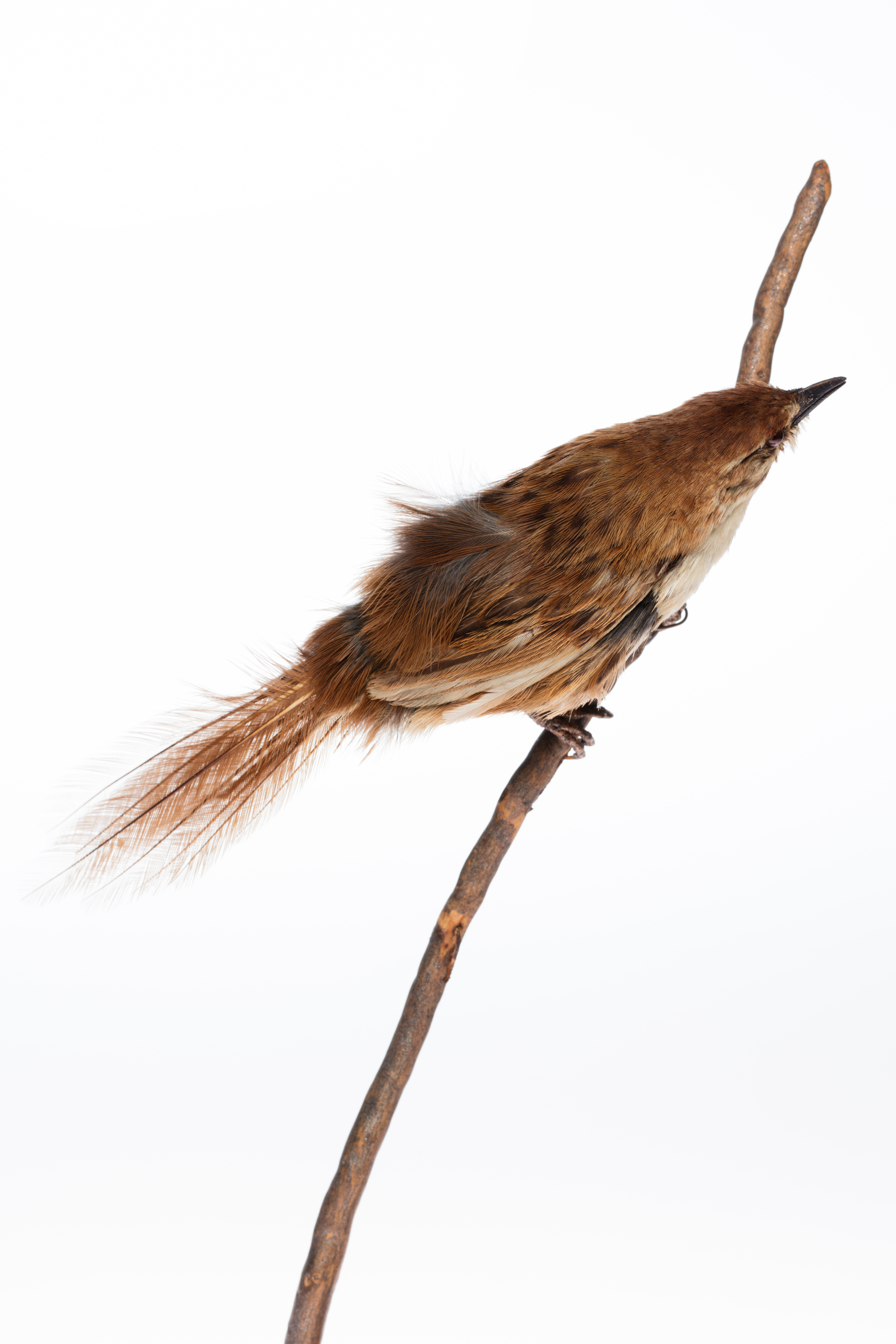
Chatham Islands fernbird mount from the collection of Auckland Museum
