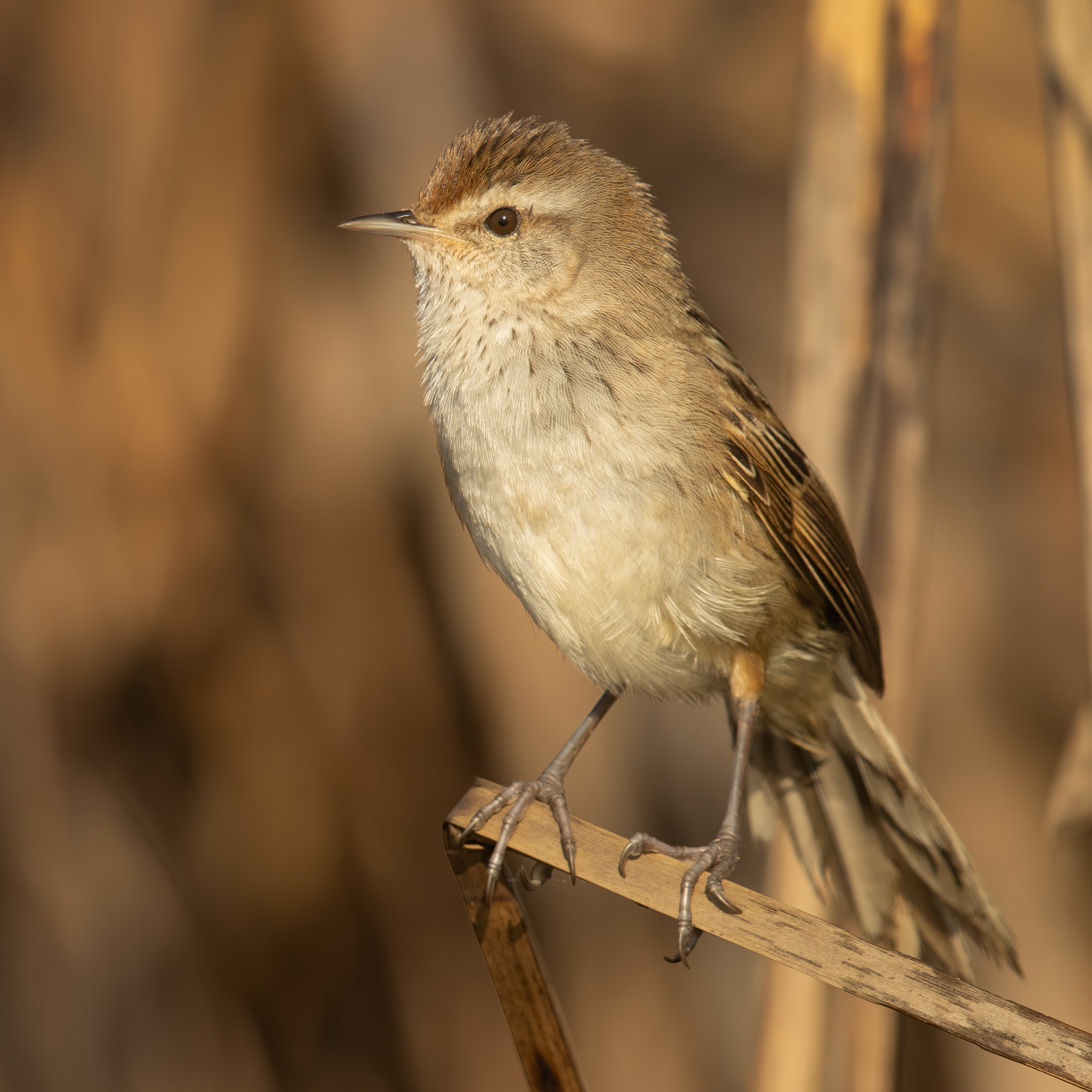
- Adult
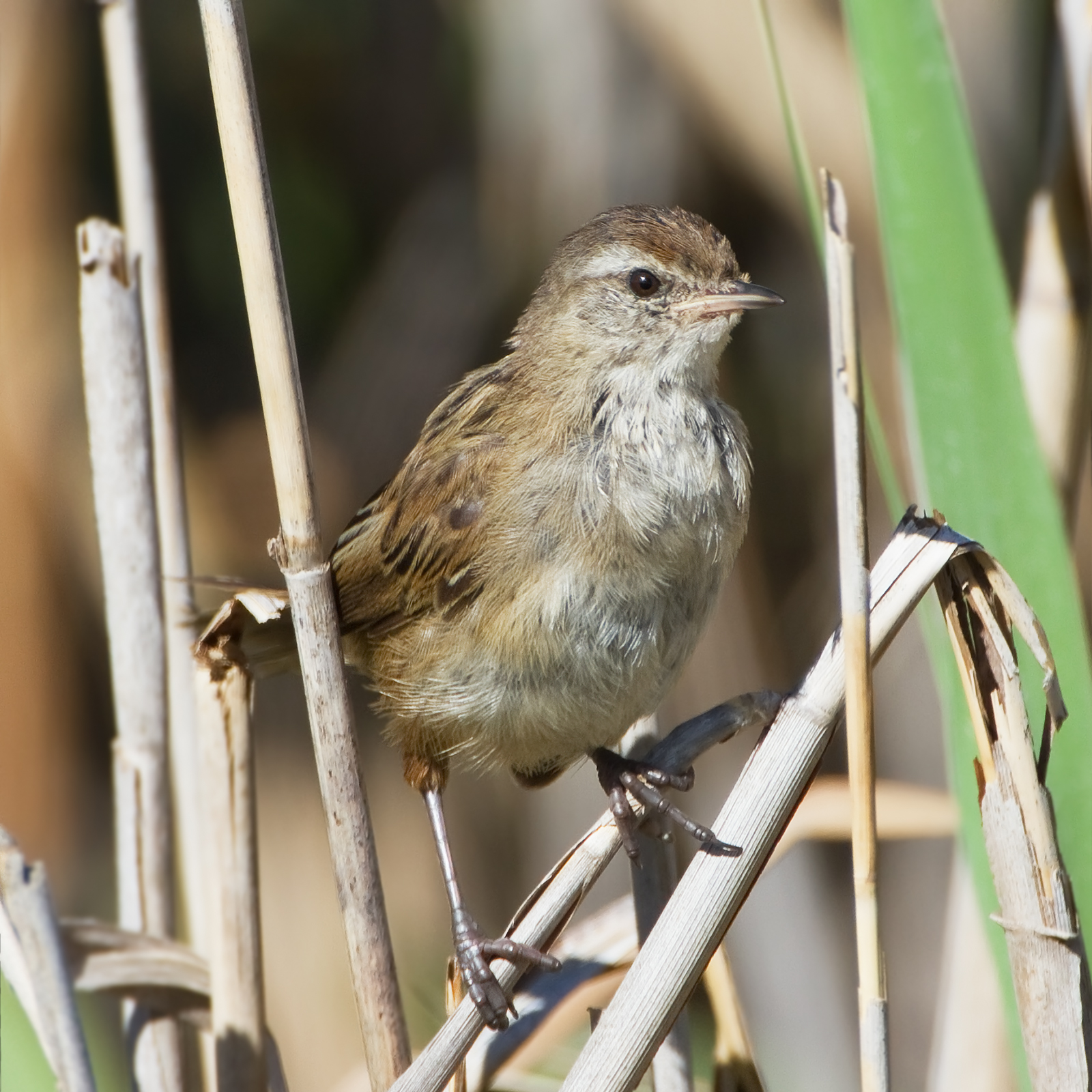
- Juvenile

Conservation status
- Least Concern (IUCN 3.1)

Scientific classification
- Kingdom: Animalia
- Phylum: Chordata
- Class: Aves
- Order: Passeriformes
- Family: Locustellidae
- Genus: Poodytes
- Species: P. gramineus

Binomial name
- Poodytes gramineus (Gould, 1845)

Synonyms
- Megalurus gramineus

= Little grassbird =

Species of bird

The little grassbird (Poodytes gramineus) is a species of Old World warbler in the family Locustellidae. It is found in Australia and in West Papua, Indonesia. These sexually monomorphic birds are found in reed beds, rushes, lignum swamps and salt marshes of Southeastern Australia.

The little grassbird is an inconspicuous and dull-coloured bird that is heard more regularly than it is seen, known for readily engaging in conversation with people. They feed on insects and small arthropods, usually remaining in densely covered areas of vegetation and living nomadically with no regular migration patterns.

== Taxonomy ==
Old World warblers are a large group of birds formerly grouped together in the family Sylviidae. The family held over 400 species in over 70 genera, and were the source of much taxonomic confusion. Grass warblers are sometimes strongly patterned but generally very drab in overall colouration.

The family Locustellidae was named by the French naturalist Charles Lucien Bonaparte in 1854 and is derived from the genus name Locustella named by Johann Jakob Kaup in 1829. The little grassbird was formally described in 1845 by the English ornithologist John Gould under the binomial name Sphenoeacus gramineus. It is now placed in the genus Poodytes that was introduced in 1851 by the German ornithologist Jean Cabanis. The genus name combines the Ancient Greek poa meaning "grass" with dutēs meaning "diver". The specific epithet is from Latin and means "grassy" or "grass-like".

While the family name Locustellidae is generallty accepted, some authorities place the little grassbird in the Sylviidae family. Also the genus name Poodytes is normally used but megalurus is also commonly used. The little grassbird has also been known as Grassbird, Little Marshbird, Little Reed Bird, Marsh Warbler and Striated Grassbird.

Four subspecies are recognised:

- Poodytes gramineus papuensis – West Papua, Indonesia
- Poodytes gramineus goulburni – Northern Territory, South Australia, Queensland, NSW and Victoria
- Poodytes gramineus thomasi – Western Australia
- Poodytes gramineus gramineus – Tasmania and Bass Strait islands, extra-tropical Southern Australia

== Description ==
It is an olive-brown/ brown-grey bird, measuring 13 to 15 cm, with a pale eyebrow and dark grey streaks in the throat, crown and cheeks. The upper body is brown-grey, streaked dark grey and the lighter grey underparts are also streaky. The wing feathers are dark with white edges. Adult male and female grassbirds are indistinguishable to the naked eye; however, males are larger for all parameters aside from the bill.

The Slater Field Guide notes that the voice is a "plaintive three noted monotone, tee-ti-teee." The Australian Bird Guide notes that the bird is more often heard rather than seen, particularly in the breeding season where it gives "a sequence of 2-3 plaintive piping whistles p-pee-pee repeated incessantly."

The tawny grassbird (Cincloramphus timoriensis) is slightly larger and more rufous, particularly its crown. The striated fieldwren (Calamanthus fuliginosus) is quite similar, differing in its yellow underparts, and distinctive white eyebrows.

== Distribution and habitat ==
The little grassbird is found across Eastern Australia and Tasmania, inland to Central Australia and South-Western Australia. It is also found in West Papua, Indonesia. It lives in dense wetland vegetation, sedges, reeds and rank grass. It also uses shrubs such as lignum, saltmarsh and low mangroves. After rains the little grassbird will move into temporary wetlands.

The occurrence of the little grassbird in West Papua is not common or widespread. Ebird identifies two locations only and the Atlas of Australian birds (1984) states only one specimen is known.

== Behaviour and ecology ==
=== Food and feeding ===
The little Grassbird eats insects and other small arthropods, usually remaining in the dense cover of grasses and swamp vegetation.

=== Breeding ===
The breeding period is from August to December, or after rain. Nests are deep and cup-shaped consisting of grass, twigs and stems lined with feathers, typically of the Australasian swamphen (Porphyrio melanotus), and situated in tall grasses, reeds and low shrubs. A clutch consists of 3-5 whitish/pink-white, grey speckled eggs.

Observations of breeding biology and sex allocation have shown a highly male-biased population sex ratio, with some breeding territories having numerous extra males. There is little evidence to determine whether little grassbirds breed cooperatively. Male and female growth rates showed no notable difference.

== Status ==
The species has been assessed as Least Concern by the IUCN. The population trend appears to be increasing; therefore the species does not reach the thresholds for a vulnerable listing. Birtdlife Australia lists it as secure in all states.

== Gallery ==
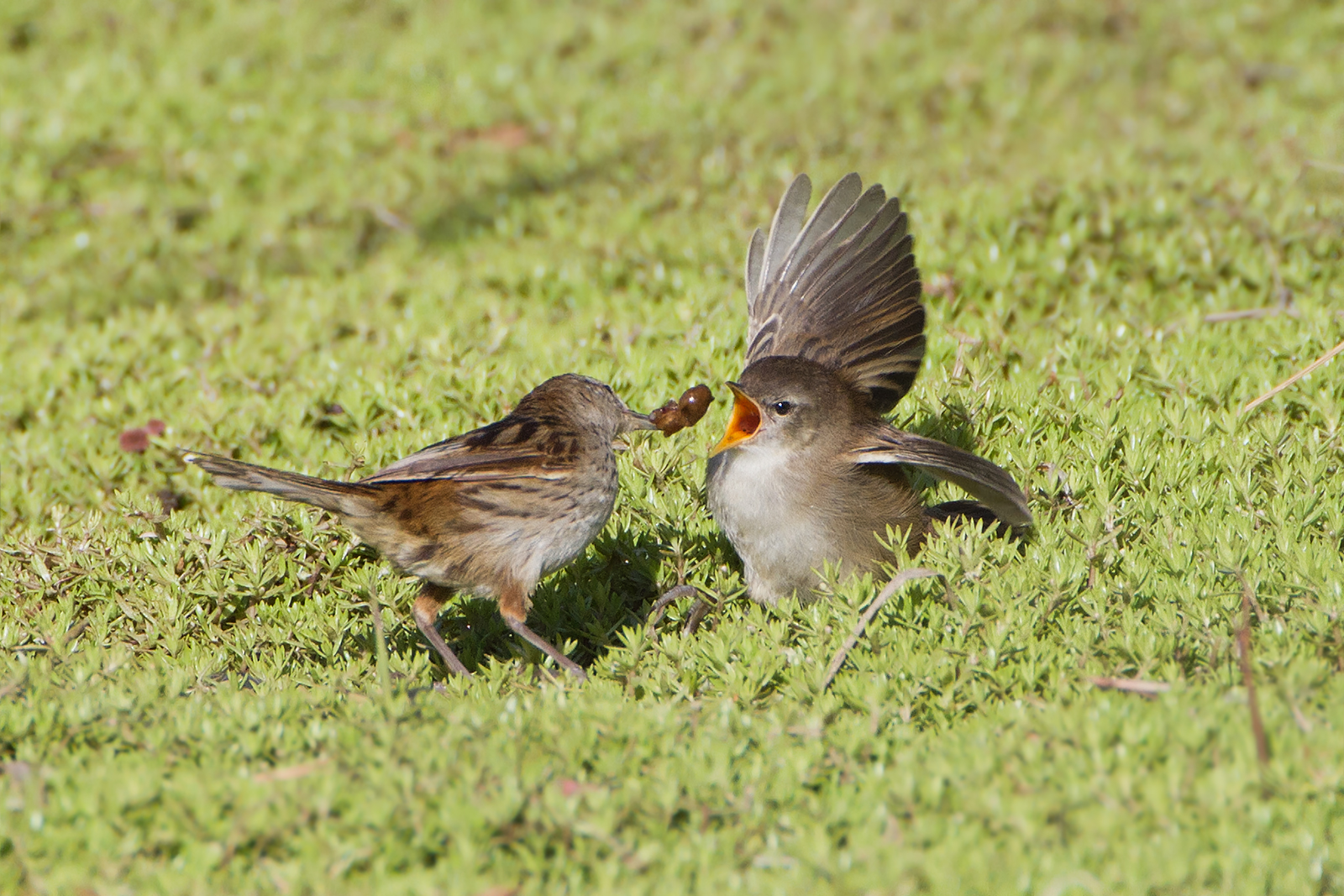
Little grassbird adult feeding juvenile, Gould's Lagoon, Tasmania
