= Bougainville thicketbird =

Conservation status
- Near Threatened (IUCN 3.1)

Scientific classification
- Kingdom: Animalia
- Phylum: Chordata
- Class: Aves
- Order: Passeriformes
- Family: Locustellidae
- Genus: Cincloramphus
- Species: C. llaneae

Binomial name
- Cincloramphus llaneae (Hadden, 1983)

Synonyms
- Cichlornis llaneae Megalurulus llaneae

Species of bird

The Bougainville thicketbird (Cincloramphus llaneae) is a bird species. It had been placed in the "Old World warbler" family Sylviidae, but it does not seem to be a close relative of the typical warblers; probably it belongs in the grass warbler family Locustellidae. It is endemic to Bougainville Island. Its natural habitat is montane forest with thick understory above 1500m. It used to be considered conspecific with the Santo thicketbird and the New Britain thicketbird.
