= Field Guide to the Birds of Australia (Simpson & Day) =

- First edition
- Author: Ken Simpson
- Original title: The Birds of Australia – a Book of Identification
- Illustrator: Nicolas Day
- Cover artist: Nicolas Day
- Language: English
- Subject: Australian birds
- Genre: Field guide
- Publisher: Lloyd O'Neil: Melbourne
- Publication date: 1984
- Publication place: Australia
- Media type: Print (hardback)
- Pages: 352
- ISBN: 0-85550-492-7
- Dewey Decimal: 598.2994

The Simpson and Day Field Guide to the Birds of Australia is one of the main national bird field guides used by Australian birders, which over the years has evolved through several revised and updated editions. Total sales exceed 500,000 copies.

== History ==
The book was first published in 1984 by Lloyd O'Neil as The Birds of Australia, in hardcover format with a dust jacket, 285 mm high by 215 mm wide and weighing 1.7 kg. It contained illustrations by Nicolas Day of 758 species on 128 colour plates. It was divided into three main sections, a key to bird families, the field information section with the plates opposite the relevant species descriptions and distribution maps, and the "handbook" with more detailed information on avian biology. The endpapers featured life-size profile drawings of the bills of albatrosses and petrels to aid the identification of beach-washed seabirds.

Although the dust jacket and title page featured Ken Simpson and Nicolas Day as coauthors, the acknowledgements principally credited Ken Simpson as Editor, Nicolas Day as Illustrator and Peter Trusler as Art Director, with several others credited as writers, contributing illustrators and in other capacities.

Subsequent editions were published by Penguin Australia under the Viking imprint in a smaller size (220 mm high by 160 mm wide and only half the weight), with a flexible, waterproof, plastic cover suitable for use as a field guide, and renamed the Field Guide to the Birds of Australia. Additional developments were a rare bird bulletin section to cover vagrant and newly recorded species and to encourage users to report sightings of rarities, and the inclusion of checklists for Australia's outlying islands and external territories. From the seventh edition the handbook section was dropped and the rare bird bulletin extended.

=== Editions ===
- 1st – 1984
- 2nd – 1986
- 3rd – 1989
- 4th – 1993
- 5th – 1996
- 6th – 1999
- 7th – 2004
- 8th – 2010
