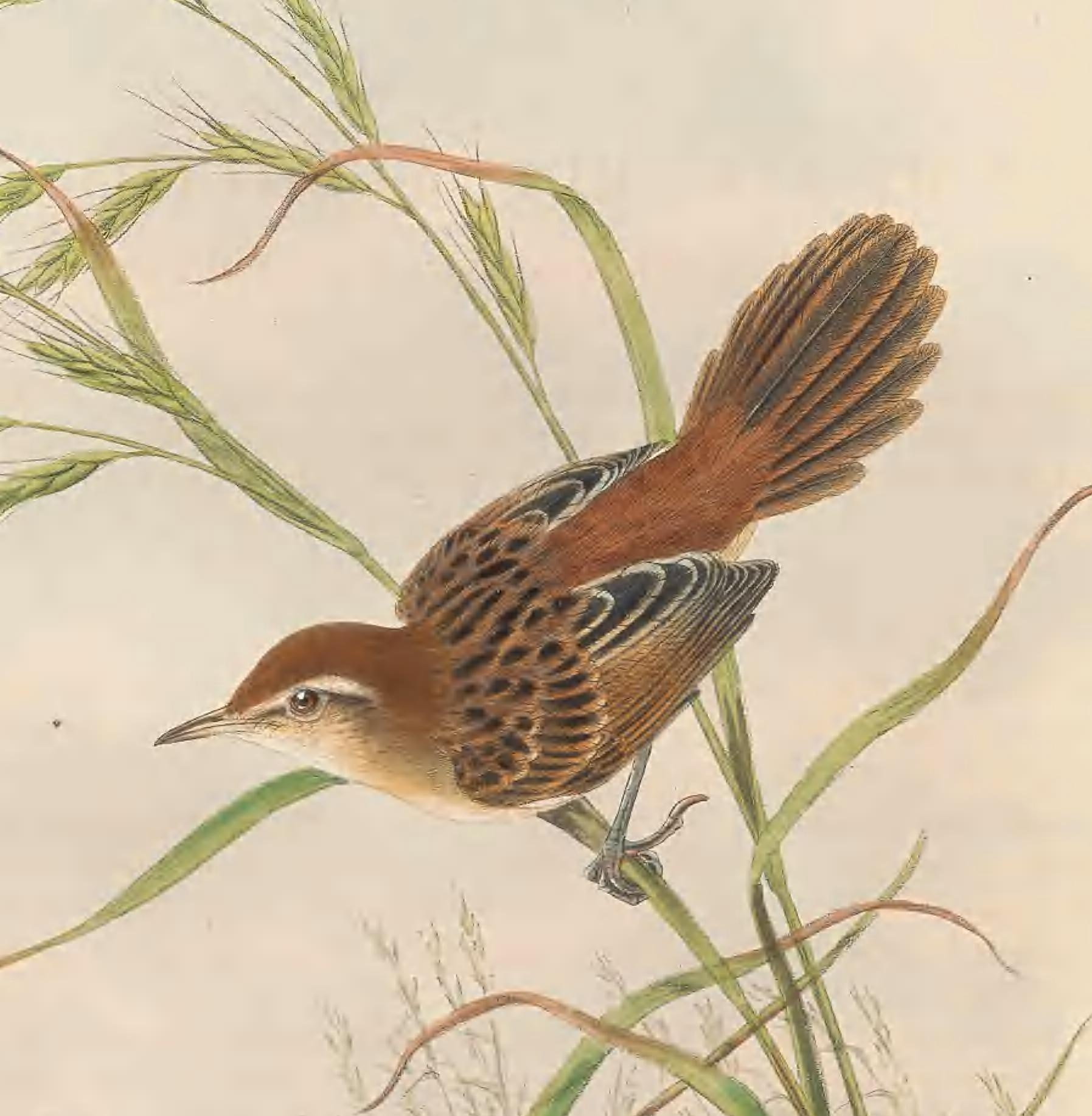
- Illustration by John Gould

Conservation status
- Vulnerable (IUCN 3.1)

Scientific classification
- Kingdom: Animalia
- Phylum: Chordata
- Class: Aves
- Order: Passeriformes
- Family: Locustellidae
- Genus: Poodytes
- Species: P. albolimbatus

Binomial name
- Poodytes albolimbatus D'Albertis & Salvadori, 1879

Synonyms
- Megalurus albolimbatus

= Fly River grassbird =

Species of bird

The Fly River grassbird (Poodytes albolimbatus) is a species of Old World warbler in the family Locustellidae. It is found in Indonesia and Papua New Guinea. Its natural habitats are freshwater marshes and lakes. It is threatened by habitat loss.

The Fly River grassbird was formally described in 1879 by the Italian naturalists Luigi D'Albertis and Tommaso Salvadori from specimens collected near the Fly River in New Guinea. They coined the binomial name Poodytes albolimbatus. The genus name combines the Ancient Greek poa meaning "grass" with dutēs meaning "diver". The specific albolimbatus combines the Latin albus meaning "white" with limbatus meaning "edged" (from limbus meaning "border", "fringe" or "band"). The species is monotypic: no subspecies are recognised.
