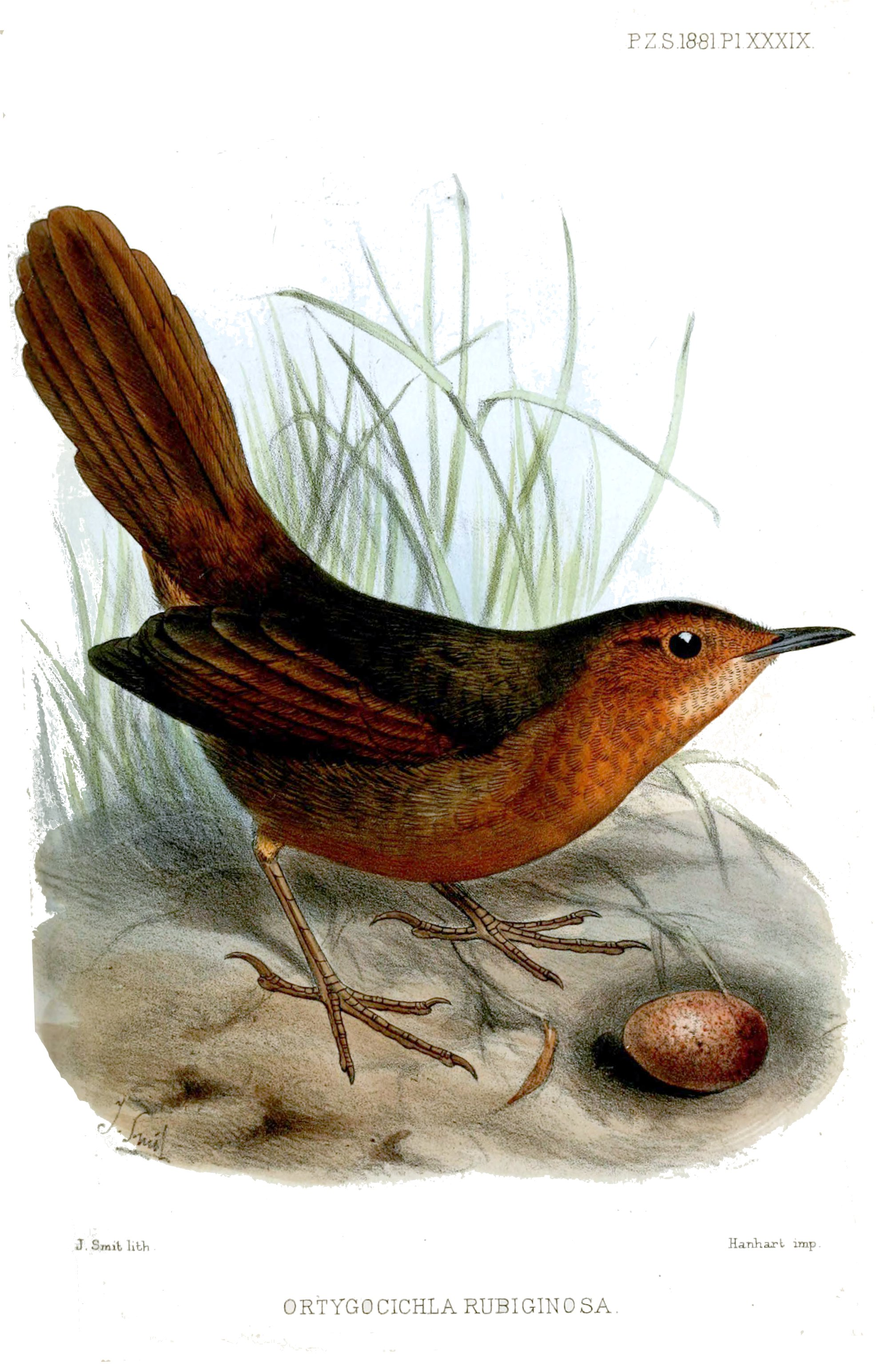
- Illustration by Joseph Smit (1881)

Conservation status
- Least Concern (IUCN 3.1)

Scientific classification
- Kingdom: Animalia
- Phylum: Chordata
- Class: Aves
- Order: Passeriformes
- Family: Locustellidae
- Genus: Cincloramphus
- Species: C. rubiginosus

Binomial name
- Cincloramphus rubiginosus (PL Sclater, 1881)

Synonyms
- Ortygocichla rubiginosa Megalurulus rubiginosus

= Rusty thicketbird =

Species of bird

The rusty thicketbird (Cincloramphus rubiginosus) is a bird species. Previously placed in the "Old World warbler" family Sylviidae, it does not seem to be a close relative of the typical warblers; probably it belongs in the grass warbler family Locustellidae. It is found in New Britain only.
