= Nicolas Day =

Wildlife artist (born 1955)

Nicolas Day (born 1955) is an Australian wildlife artist, illustrator and teacher.

Day was born in Surrey, England, and moved to Australia at the age of ten. Having acquired an early interest in natural history, he worked as a keeper at the Melbourne Zoo before turning to wildlife illustration as a career in 1977. He joined a 1997 expedition to Raine Island as the natural history artist, as well as participating in field trips to the Outer Hebrides and subantarctic Macquarie Island. He has been the principal artist of the popular Field Guide to the Birds of Australia, coauthored with Ken Simpson and commonly referred to as "Simpson & Day", which has been published in eight editions from 1984 to 2010, selling over 500,000 copies.

== Publications ==
As well as the "Simpson & Day" field guide, books featuring Day's illustrations include:

- 1993 – Field Guide to the Birds of the ACT (with McComas Taylor)
- 1996–2006 – Handbook of Australian, New Zealand and Antarctic Birds
- 2000 – Birds of the Solomons, Vanuatu and New Caledonia (with Chris Doughty and Andrew Plant)
