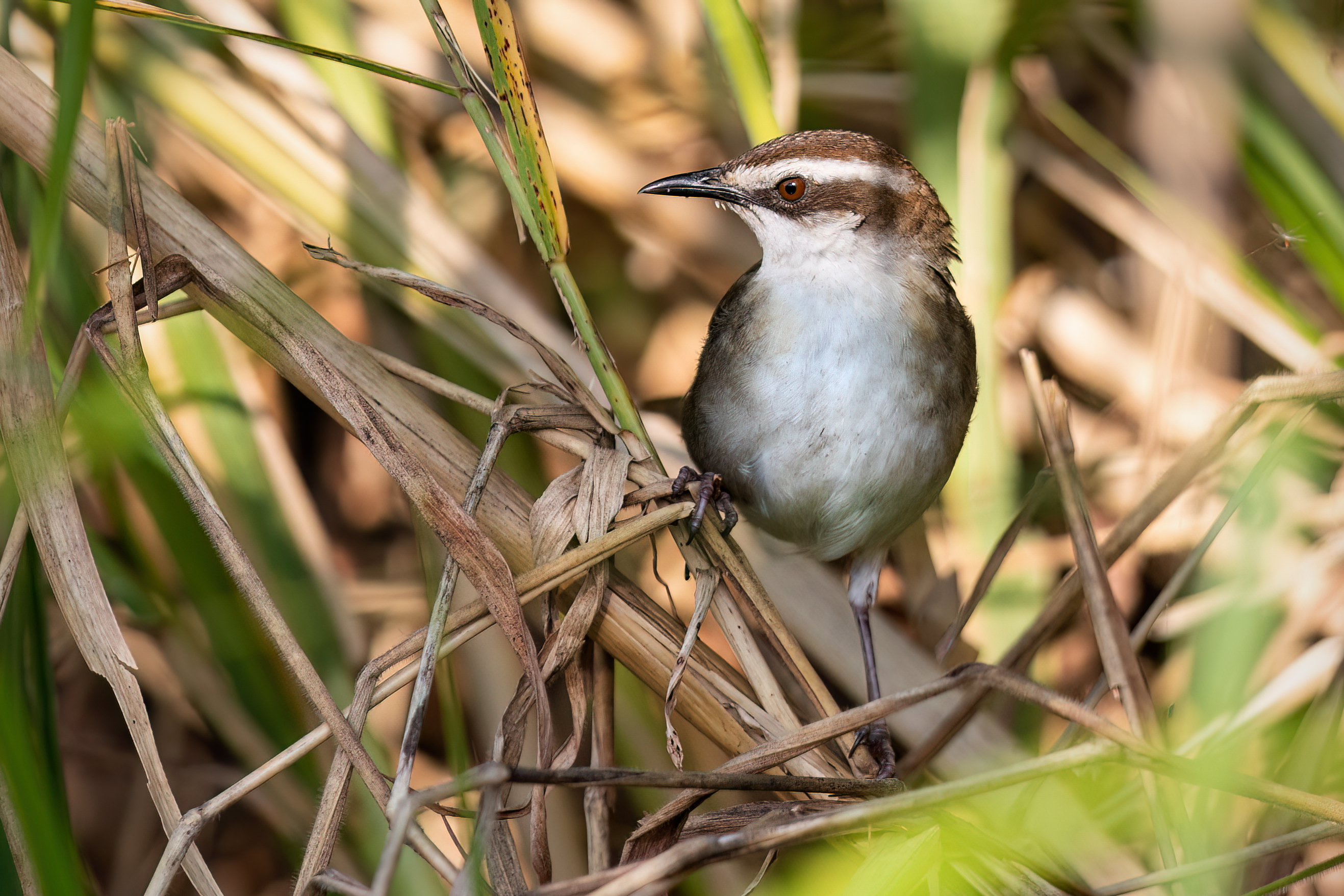

Conservation status
- Least Concern (IUCN 3.1)

Scientific classification
- Kingdom: Animalia
- Phylum: Chordata
- Class: Aves
- Order: Passeriformes
- Family: Locustellidae
- Genus: Cincloramphus
- Species: C. mariae

Binomial name
- Cincloramphus mariae (Verreaux, J, 1869)

Synonyms
- Megalurulus mariae

= New Caledonian thicketbird =

Species of bird

The New Caledonia thicketbird or New Caledonia grassbird (Cincloramphus mariae), is a bird species. Previously placed in the "Old World warbler" family Sylviidae, it does not seem to be a close relative of the typical warblers; probably it belongs in the grass warbler family Locustellidae. This species is endemic to New Caledonia.

This is a long-tailed, medium-sized "warbler" with a distinctive bold white supercilium. The bird's plumage is unstreaked, with olive-brown uppersides (including the crown and wings) and creamy white undersides.

The New Caledonia grassbird typically inhabits scrubby areas in the lowlands and hills of New Caledonia, particularly maquis minier with ferns, but also secondary forest and grasslands, and has even been seen in dense rainforest. It is generally solitary or seen in pairs and is non-migratory. The New Caledonian grassbird favours dense cover and is retiring in its habits and is a difficult bird to observe or study.
