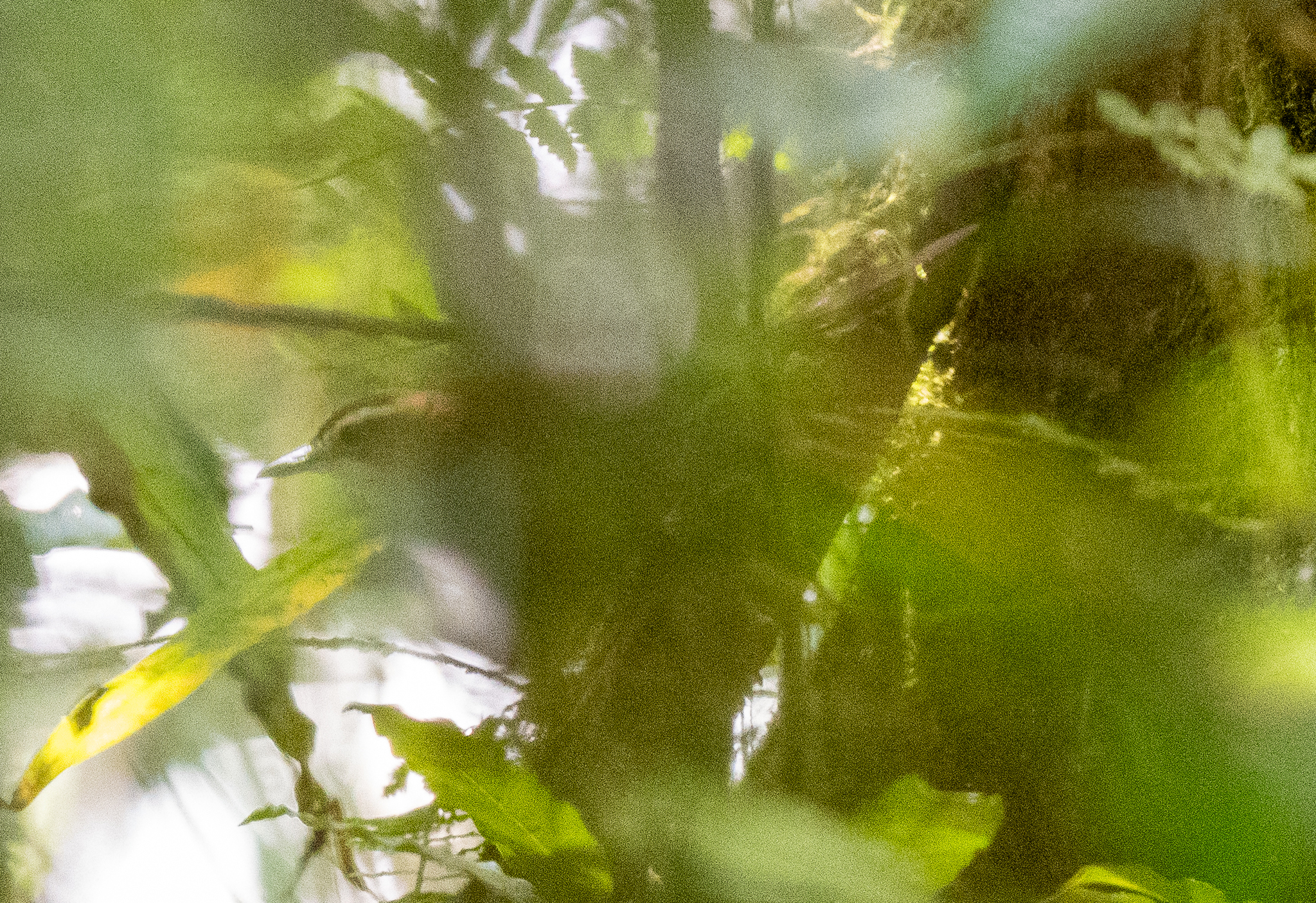

Conservation status
- Endangered (IUCN 3.1)

Scientific classification
- Kingdom: Animalia
- Phylum: Chordata
- Class: Aves
- Order: Passeriformes
- Family: Locustellidae
- Genus: Cincloramphus
- Species: C. rufus

Binomial name
- Cincloramphus rufus (Reichenow, 1891)

Subspecies
- C. r. rufus Viti Levu long-legged warbler; C. r. cluniei Vanua Levu long-legged warbler (possibly extinct)

Synonyms
- Trichocichla rufa Megalurulus rufus

= Long-legged thicketbird =

Species of bird

The long-legged thicketbird (Cincloramphus rufus) is a small bird endemic to Fiji. The species is sometimes known as the long-legged warbler. It was formerly classified as the sole representative of the genus Trichocichla.

The long-legged thicketbird is a large thin warbler (19 cm) with a long tail and long legs. The species' plumage is reddish brown, the throat, breast and belly being white and the face being marked with a distinctive eye-stripe. The long-legged thicketbird is a shy bird and easily overlooked as it forages on the ground in pairs or small family groups. It has a distinctive alarm call, and a variable and loud song somewhat similar to that of the Fiji bush warbler. The species inhabits old-growth forest in mountainous areas on Viti Levu, usually in habitat adjacent to streams.

The long-legged thicketbird was first collected in 1890 and four specimens were collected between then and 1894, after which the species was not seen again until 1974 (though there were a few unconfirmed sightings). In 1974 the Vanua Levu subspecies Megalurulus rufus cluniei was discovered (although it has not been seen since). In 2003 scientists from BirdLife International working in Wabu Forest Reserve in Viti Levu discovered a small population of M. rufus. Twelve pairs, along with two recently fledged chicks, were observed by the team.

Other populations were subsequently found to occur in various locations in old-growth montane forest between 300 and 800 meters AMSL. The population is assessed to be stable or at least not declining rapidly, if very small (between 50 and 249 mature birds) but protection of sufficient habitat is necessary to keep it that way. Threats include some logging and the impact of introduced predators (the small Asian mongoose and the black rat). Neither has been quantified, but they appear not to be very serious at present.
