= New Britain thicketbird =

Conservation status
- Vulnerable (IUCN 3.1)

Scientific classification
- Kingdom: Animalia
- Phylum: Chordata
- Class: Aves
- Order: Passeriformes
- Family: Locustellidae
- Genus: Cincloramphus
- Species: C. grosvenori

Binomial name
- Cincloramphus grosvenori (Gilliard, 1960)

Synonyms
- Megalurulus grosvenori

Species of bird

The New Britain thicketbird or Bismarck thicketbird (Cincloramphus grosvenori) is a bird species. It used to be placed in the "Old World warbler" family Sylviidae, but it does not seem to be a close relative of the typical warblers; probably it belongs in the grass warbler family Locustellidae. It is found only in the rarely visited highlands of the island of New Britain in Papua New Guinea.

This little-known species was for long classified as a data deficient species by the IUCN, due to the general lack of reliable data on its distribution and numbers. While there have been no records since its discovery in 1959, recent evidence suggests the habitat destruction in the Bismarck Archipelago presents a greater risk than previously believed, leading to the Bismarck thicketbird being listed as a Vulnerable species in the 2008 red list.

It used to be considered conspecific with the Santo thicketbird and the Bougainville thicketbird.
