= Ken Simpson =

Australian ornithologist (1938–2014)

Kenneth Nigel Graham Simpson (1938 – 9 July 2014) was an Australian ornithologist and ornithological writer best known for writing, with artist Nicolas Day, the Field Guide to the Birds of Australia.

Simpson was born in Sydney and educated at University High School in Melbourne. He subsequently worked as a research technician in various institutions as well as lecturing in primary science at Deakin University and leading birdwatching tours. During the mid-1960s he studied royal penguins and wandering albatrosses on subantarctic Macquarie Island. He had a long association with the Bird Observers Club of Australia (BOCA), which he joined at the age of 11 in 1949, and was involved in editorial work with the BOCA journal Australian Bird Watcher.

In addition to his ornithological studies, while on Macquarie Island Simpson collected botanical specimens (mostly Lichens). The specimens are held at the National Herbarium of Victoria, Royal Botanic Gardens Victoria.

== Honours ==
- Honorary Degree of Master of Science, Monash University (1974)
- Australian Natural History Medallion (1996)
- President, Bird Observers Club of Australia (1996–1998)
- Honorary Life Membership, Bird Observers Club of Australia

== Publications ==
As well as numerous articles and scientific papers, books authored or coauthored by Simpson include:

- 1972 – Birds in Bass Strait. Reed: Sydney. ISBN 0-589-07108-4
- 1984–2010 – Field Guide to the Birds of Australia (with Nicolas Day), first published as The Birds of Australia – a Book of Identification by Lloyd O'Neil: Melbourne, ISBN 0-85550-492-7, with several subsequent editions published by Penguin Australia (Viking)
- 1987 – Birds of Australia Logbook. Viking O'Neill Australia. ISBN 0-670-90015-X
- 1998 – Birdwatching in Australia and New Zealand. (With Zoe Wilson). Reed New Holland: Sydney. ISBN 1-876334-06-1
