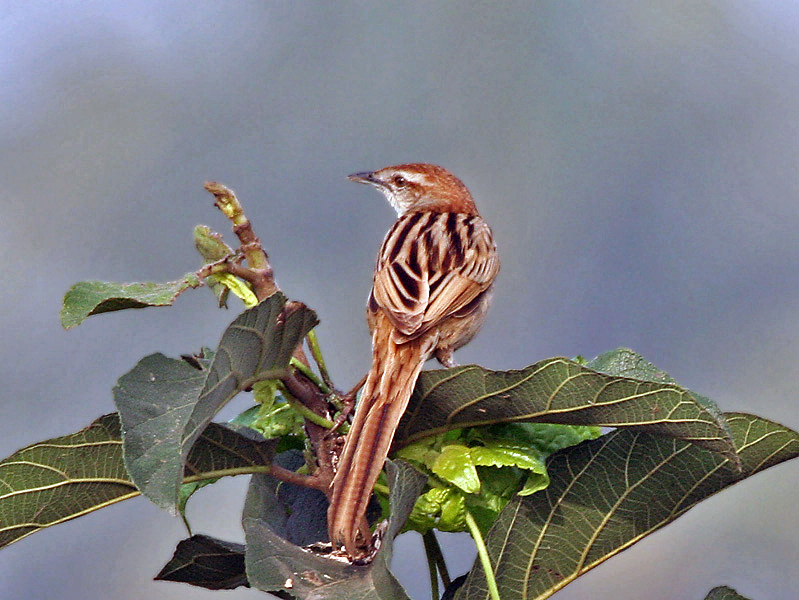
- In Kolkata, West Bengal, India.

Conservation status
- Least Concern (IUCN 3.1)

Scientific classification
- Kingdom: Animalia
- Phylum: Chordata
- Class: Aves
- Order: Passeriformes
- Family: Locustellidae
- Genus: Megalurus; Horsfield, 1821
- Species: M. palustris

Binomial name
- Megalurus palustris Horsfield, 1821

= Striated grassbird =

Species of bird

The striated grassbird (Megalurus palustris) is an "Old World warbler" species in the family Locustellidae. It was formerly placed in the family Sylviidae. It is now the only species placed in the genus Megalurus.

It is found in Bangladesh, Cambodia, China, India, Indonesia, Laos, Malaysia, Myanmar, Nepal, Pakistan, the Philippines, Thailand, and Vietnam.
Noisy and conspicuous, often sitting and calling exposed on tops of grasses, bushes and telephone wires. Note streaked crown and streaked upper breast.

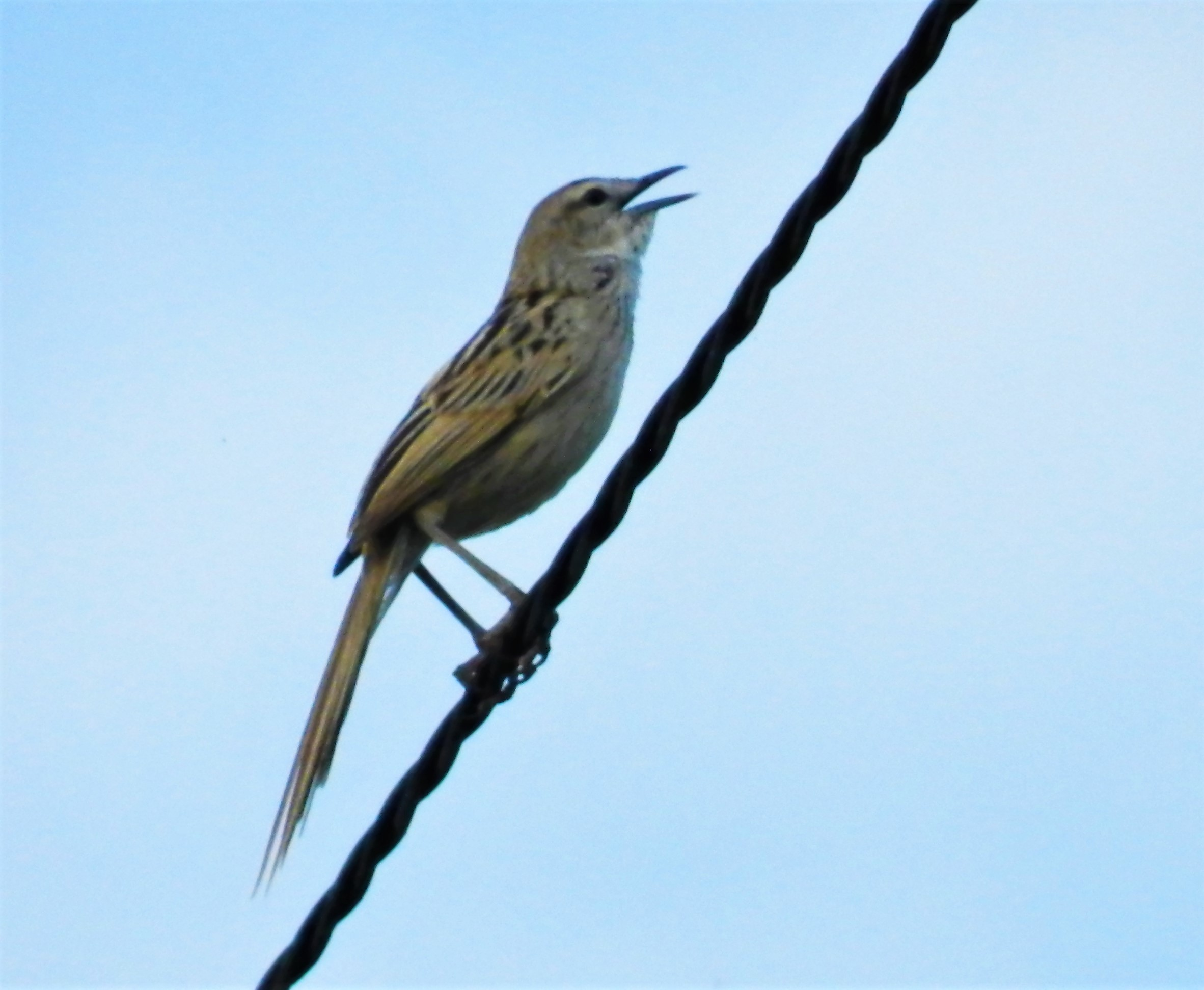
Striated Grassbird over a power wire.

This species has an extremely large range, and hence does not approach the thresholds for Vulnerable under the range size criterion (Extent of Occurrence <20,000 km2 combined with a declining or fluctuating range size, habitat extent/quality, or population size and a small number of locations or severe fragmentation). The population trend is not known, but the population is not believed to be decreasing sufficiently rapidly to approach the thresholds under the population trend criterion (>30% decline over ten years or three generations). The population size has not been quantified, but it is not believed to approach the thresholds for Vulnerable under the population size criterion (<10,000 mature individuals with a continuing decline estimated to be >10% in ten years or three generations, or with a specified population structure). For these reasons the species is evaluated as Least Concern.

The genus Megalurus formerly included additional species. A comprehensive molecular phylogenetic study of the grassbird family Locustellidae published in 2018 found that Megalurus was non-monophyletic. In the resulting reorganization, five species were moved to the resurrected genus Poodytes and four species were moved to Cincloramphus, leaving only the striated grassbird in Megalurus.
