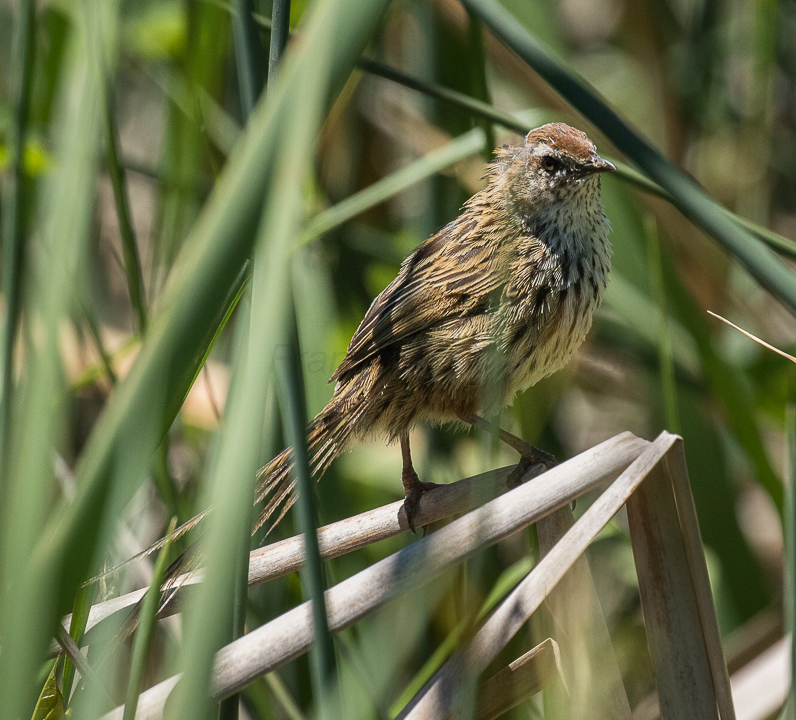

Conservation status
- Least Concern (IUCN 3.1)

Scientific classification
- Kingdom: Animalia
- Phylum: Chordata
- Class: Aves
- Order: Passeriformes
- Family: Locustellidae
- Genus: Poodytes
- Species: P. punctatus

Binomial name
- Poodytes punctatus (Quoy & Gaimard, 1832)

Synonyms
- Bowdleria punctata Megalurus punctatus

= New Zealand fernbird =

Species of bird

The New Zealand fernbird or simply fernbird (Poodytes punctatus) is an insectivorous bird endemic to New Zealand. In the Māori language, it is named kōtātā or mātātā.

== Taxonomy ==
The New Zealand fernbird, Poodytes punctatus, was described by the French zoologists Jean Quoy and Joseph Gaimard in 1832 from a specimen collected in Tasman Bay / Te Tai-o-Aorere, South Island, New Zealand. They coined the binomial name, Synallaxis punctata. (Note: Although the volume of the Voyage de la corvette l'Astrolabe has 1830 on the title page it was not published until 1832.)

In the past, this species had the binomial names Bowdleria punctatus, and more recently, Megalurus punctatus. Recent moluecular phylogenetic studies of the grassbird family Locustellidae have shown that the genus Megalurus was not monophyletic, resulting in the New Zealand fernbird, and four other Australasian species, now considered to be in the genus Poodytes.

There are five subspecies of New Zealand fernbird present on different islands. They differ in extent of reddish-brown and intensity of streaking, as well as size:

- Poodytes punctatus vealeae (Kemp, R, 1912) – North Island (New Zealand)
- Poodytes punctatus punctatus (Quoy & Gaimard, 1832) – South Island (New Zealand)
- Poodytes punctatus stewartianus (Oliver, 1930) – Stewart Island (New Zealand)
- Poodytes punctatus wilsoni (Stead, EF, 1936) – Codfish Island (=Whenua Hou, west of Stewart Island, New Zealand), named after New Zealand naturalist Robert Adams Wilson
- Poodytes punctatus caudatus (Buller, 1894) – Snares Island (south of South Island, New Zealand)

The related Chatham fernbird (Poodytes rufescens), which became extinct around 1900, was sometimes treated as a subspecies of this species.

== Description ==
The adult has a brown plumage streaked in black. The head, the upperparts and the brown wings are streaked blackish. The long graduated tail is a duller brown, with the rectrices darker. On the underparts, the chin, throat, breast and abdomen are whitish, finely mottled and also streaked blackish on the breast. The flanks, the sides of the chest and the subcaudal covers are brown and streaked blackish, more clearly on the flanks. On the head, the forehead and cap are brown.

The presence of a whitish eyebrow may be more or less clear. The auricular coverts are grey-brown with darker fine streaks that blend into the brown of the upperparts on the sides of the neck.

The beak is blackish, with the lower mandible more gray. The eyes are dark brown. Legs and toes are pinkish-brown. Both sexes are similar and the juvenile also looks like the adults.

The New Zealand fernbird is a rich brown above and white below, with brown spots on both the throat and breast. Early settlers called it the "swamp sparrow", no doubt because of its colouration. The tail feathers are thin, dark brown, and spine-like. The birds reach a length of 18 cm (7 in) ― as measured from tip of beak to end of tail. However, almost half of that is tail.

== Ecology ==
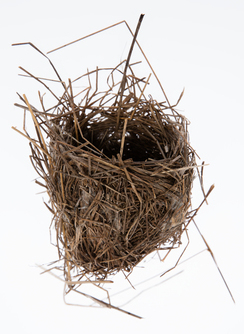
New Zealand fernbird nest from the collection of Auckland Museum

The New Zealand fernbird is a reluctant flier, mainly moving about in vegetation or in occasional flights of less than 15 metres just above the vegetation. In the 19th century, Walter Buller described it as "one of our most common" birds, but it has been adversely affected by the subsequent widespread destruction of its natural wetland habitat following European settlement and is now rare.

The New Zealand fernbird lives mainly in wet shrubby environments with swamps, peat bogs or ponds, plantation areas, temperate shrublands. It occupies an extremely wide area of occurrence at 657,000 km².

Field studies of the South Island fernbird showed they preferred shrubby habitats with low dense ground vegetation near an estuary margin.

The New Zealand fernbird is insectivorous. It feeds on caterpillars, larvae, beetles, flies and moths, as well as small spiders emerging from the cocoon. It sometimes consumes seeds and fruits.

Its song is a series of rapid whistles and clicks. The contact between the two partners is a duet, a characteristic "u-tick", that is, a sonorous "uu" for the male, to which the female answers with a high-pitched "tick". The calls are metallic. When disturbed or threatened, the male emits a typical "too-lit" and "di, di, di, di" repeated at a rapid pace.

== Breeding ==
The birds nest in sedges or other vegetation close to the ground, making a deep woven cup of dried rushes lined with feathers. Breeding occurs from September to February, producing clutches of 2–3 pinkish-white eggs with brown or purple speckles. The Māori phrase "te whare o te mātātā" (a fernbird's house) describes a woven flax cape, made to keep out the weather; a testament to the design and strength of the nest.

Both adults incubate for about 13 days. The chicks are fed small insects by the parents. They leave the nest after 15–17 days and sometimes at 20–21 days after hatching. They can breed as early as 9 months of age. Pairs raise between 1 and 3 broods. Juveniles still depend on the parents for food for a few weeks after leaving the nest.

In a two-year field study, South Island fernbirds strongly defended their territories during the preebreeding and breeding seasons.

== Place in Māori culture ==
Māori revered the fernbird as an "oracle" or "wise bird" (Manu tohu). The calls of the bird were interpreted as heralding success or failure in daily activities such as fishing, but on a more serious level they could also portend prosperity and health or disaster and death.

== Conservation status ==
Although the population is in decline, it is considered by the IUCN as a species of Least Concern. According to the most recent Conservation status of birds in Aotearoa New Zealand, the subspecies have the following threat status:

- Poodytes punctatus vealeae – North Island – Declining
- Poodytes punctatus punctatus – South Island – Declining
- Poodytes punctatus stewartianus – Stewart Island – Nationally Vulnerable
- Poodytes punctatus wilsoni – Codfish Island | Whenua Hou – Naturally Uncommon
- Poodytes punctatus caudatus – Snares Island – Naturally Uncommon

New Zealand fernbird populations are affected by wetland drainage and rat predation. Positive short-term affects on fernbird breeding, and no negative affects, were documented in a 2021 study to control introduced mammalian predators.

== Gallery ==
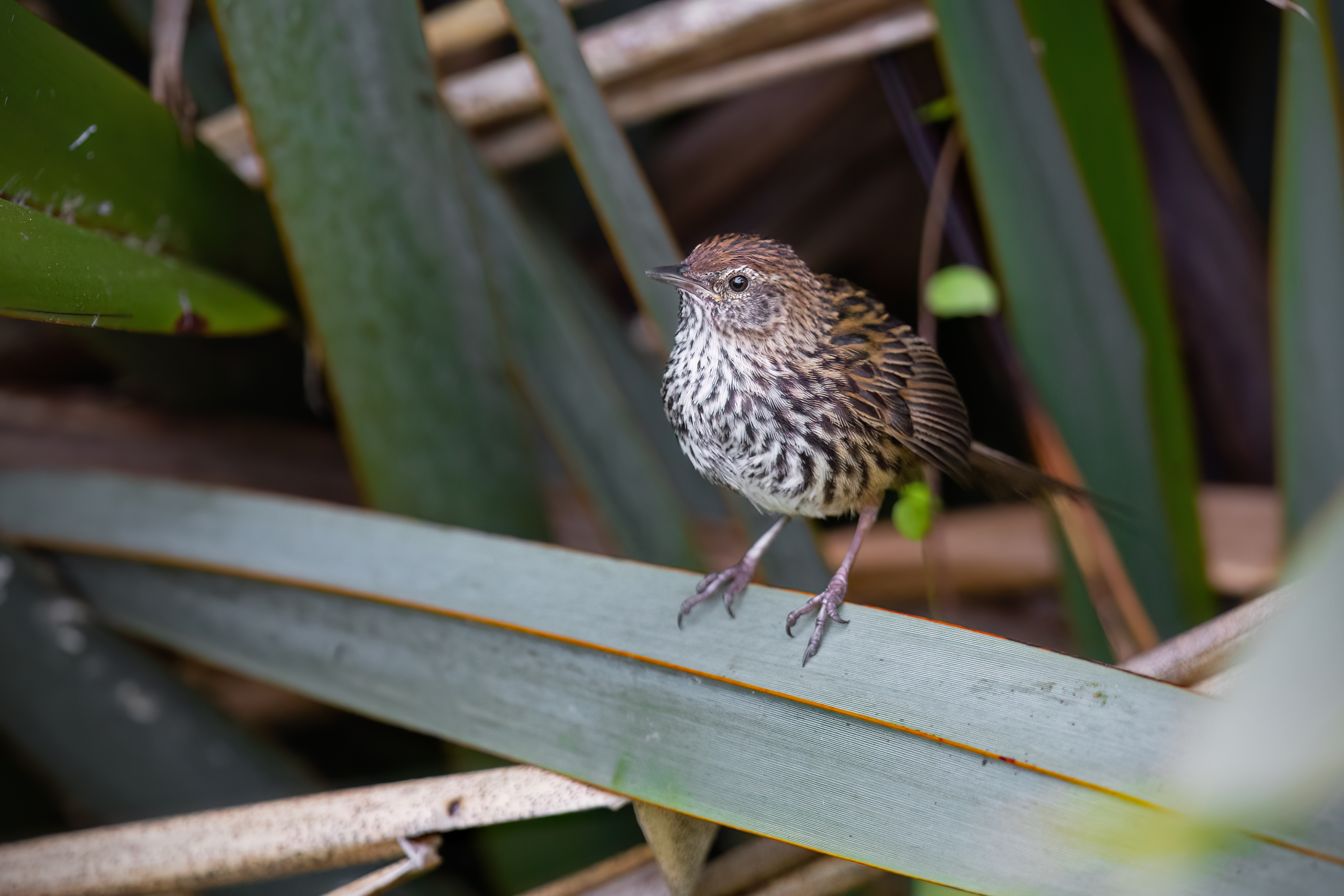

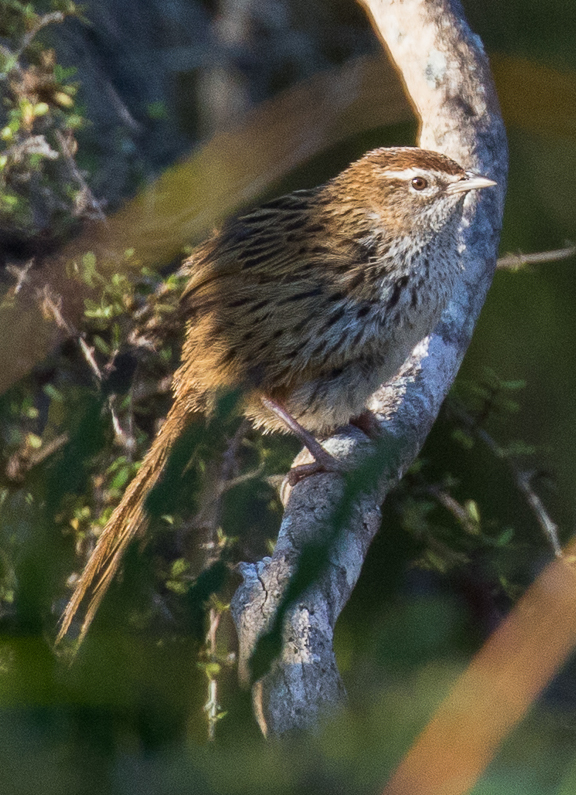

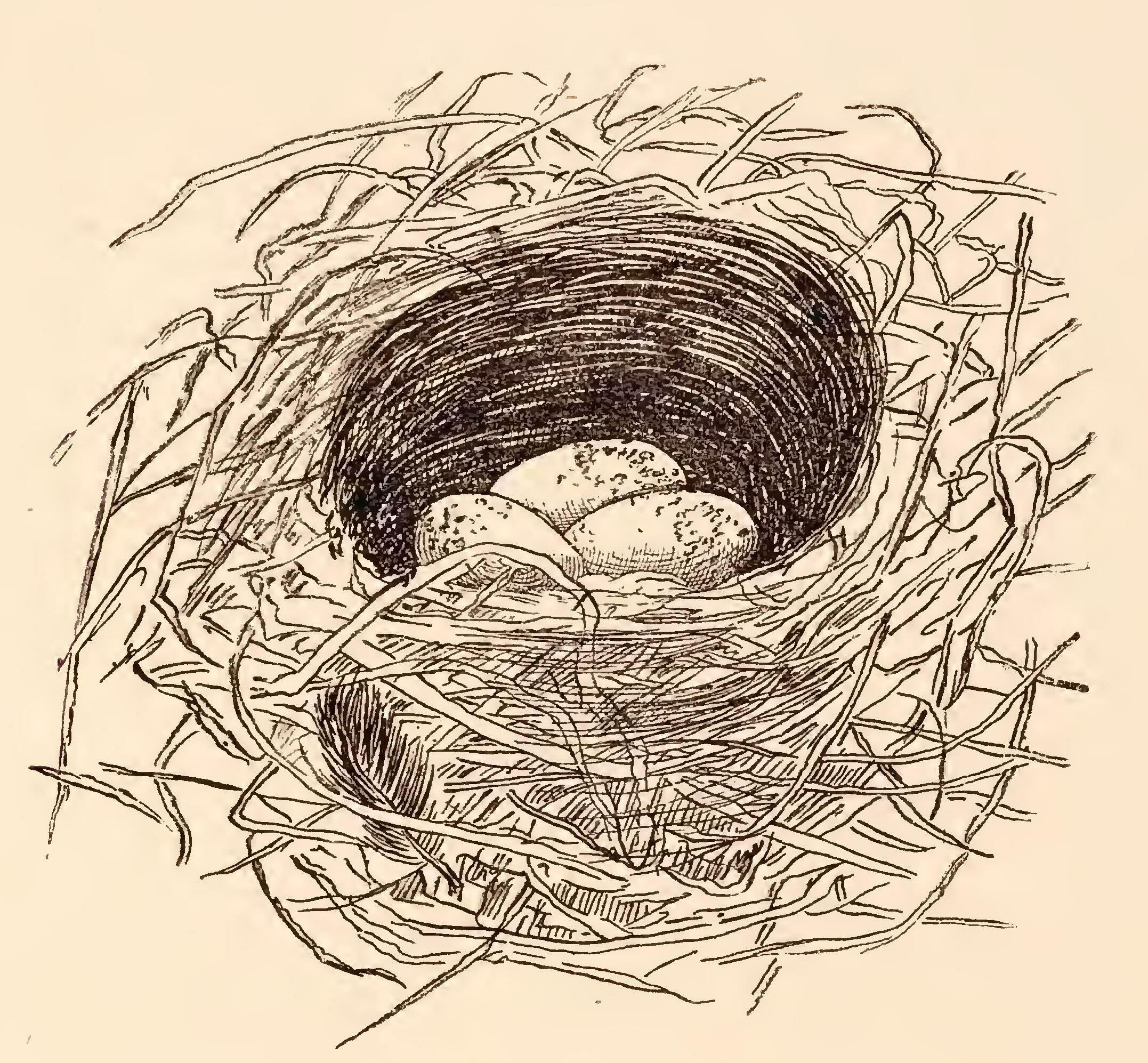

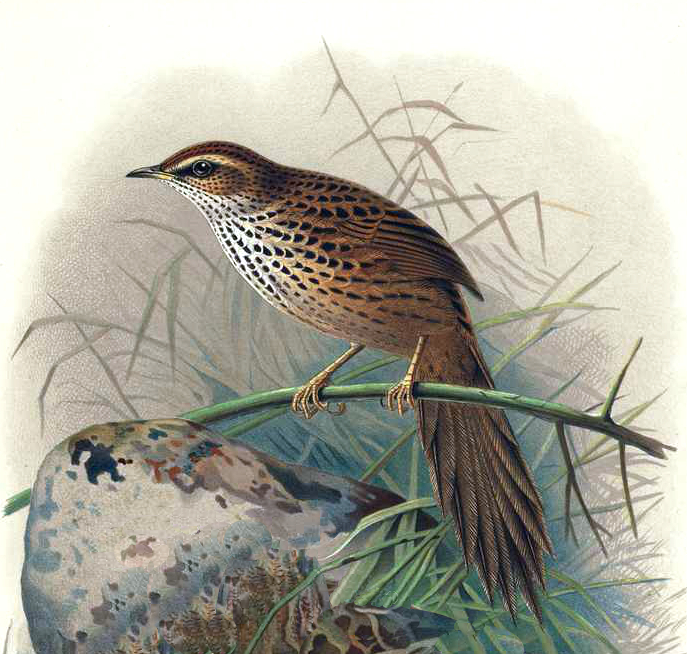

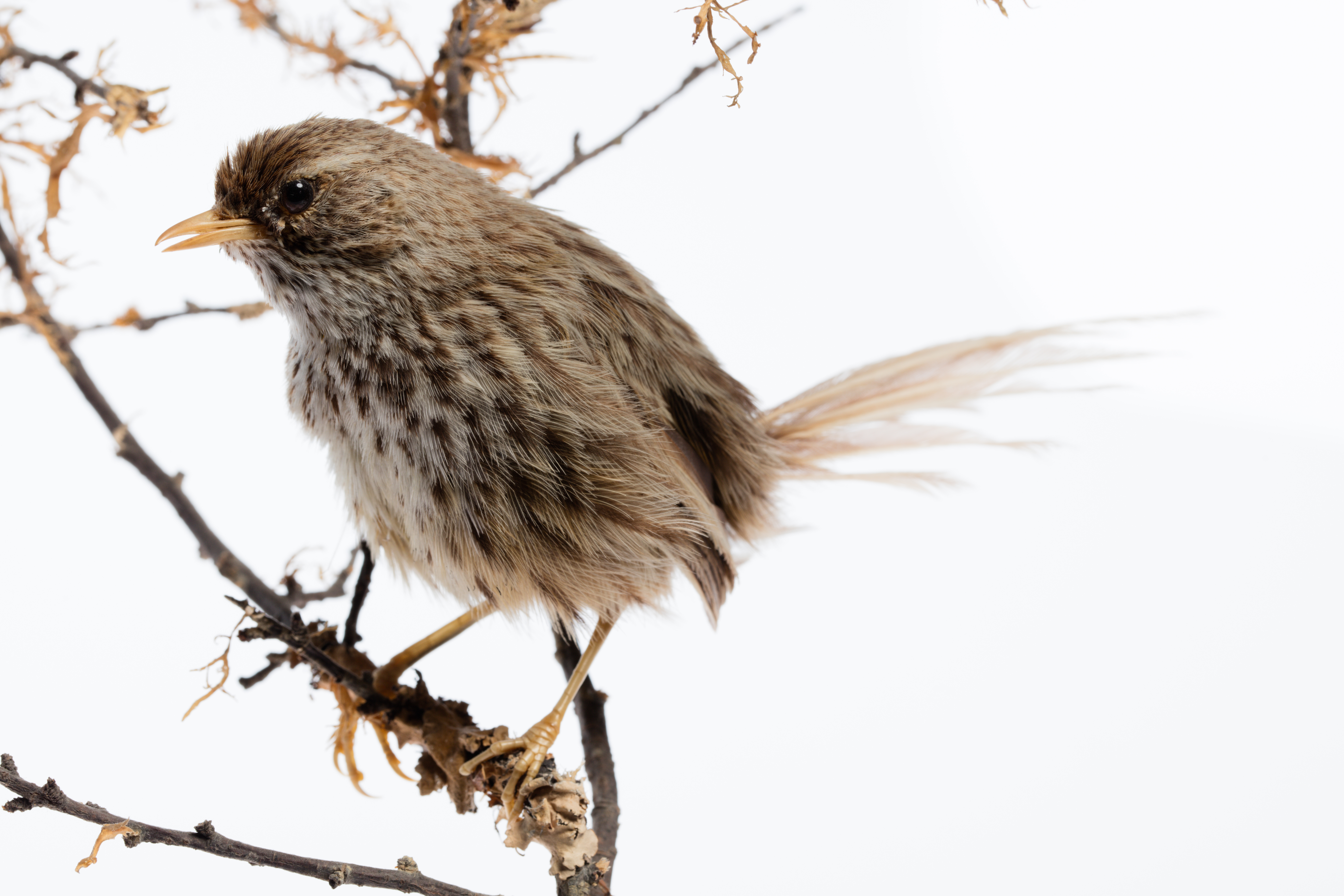
