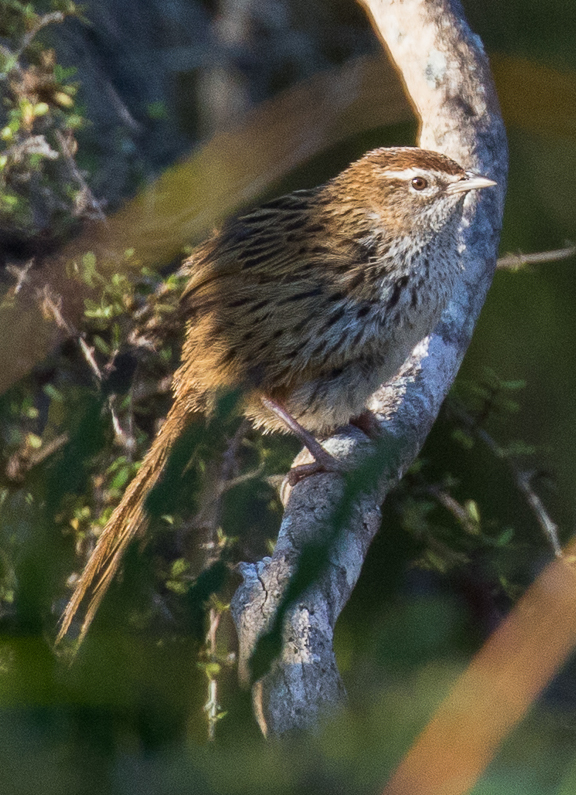
- New Zealand fernbird

Scientific classification
- Kingdom: Animalia
- Phylum: Chordata
- Class: Aves
- Order: Passeriformes
- Family: Locustellidae
- Genus: Poodytes; Cabanis, 1851

Type species
- Sphenoeacus gramineus Gould, 1845

= Poodytes =

Genus of birds

Poodytes is a genus of passerine birds in the grassbird family Locustellidae.

A molecular phylogenetic study of the grassbird family Locustellidae published in 2018 found that some of the genera, as then defined, were non-monophyletic. In the resulting rearrangement to create monophyletic genera, five species were moved from Megalurus to the resurrected genus Poodytes. The genus had been introduced in 1851 by the German ornithologist Jean Cabanis to accommodate the little grassbird which is therefore the type species. The genus name combines the Ancient Greek poa meaning "grass" with dutēs meaning "diver".

The genus contains the following four extant (and one extinct) species:

Image	Common name	Scientific name
	Fly River grassbird	Poodytes albolimbatus
	Spinifexbird	Poodytes carteri
	† Chatham Islands fernbird	Poodytes rufescens (extinct by 1900)
	New Zealand fernbird	Poodytes punctatus
	Little grassbird	Poodytes gramineus
