= Santo thicketbird =

Conservation status
- Least Concern (IUCN 3.1)

Scientific classification
- Kingdom: Animalia
- Phylum: Chordata
- Class: Aves
- Order: Passeriformes
- Family: Locustellidae
- Genus: Cincloramphus
- Species: C. whitneyi

Binomial name
- Cincloramphus whitneyi (Mayr, 1933)

Synonyms
- Megalurulus whitneyi

Species of bird

The Santo thicketbird (Cincloramphus whitneyi) is a bird species. It used to be placed in the "Old World warbler" family Sylviidae, but it does not seem to be a close relative of the typical warblers; it belongs in the grass warbler family, Locustellidae. It is found on the Pacific Ocean island of Espiritu Santo in Vanuatu.

The Santo thicketbird is around 16.5 cm long, a slender bird with long legs and a long tail.

Its natural habitats are subtropical or tropical moist lowland forest and subtropical or tropical moist montane forest.

It used to be considered conspecific with the New Britain thicketbird and the Bougainville thicketbird.
