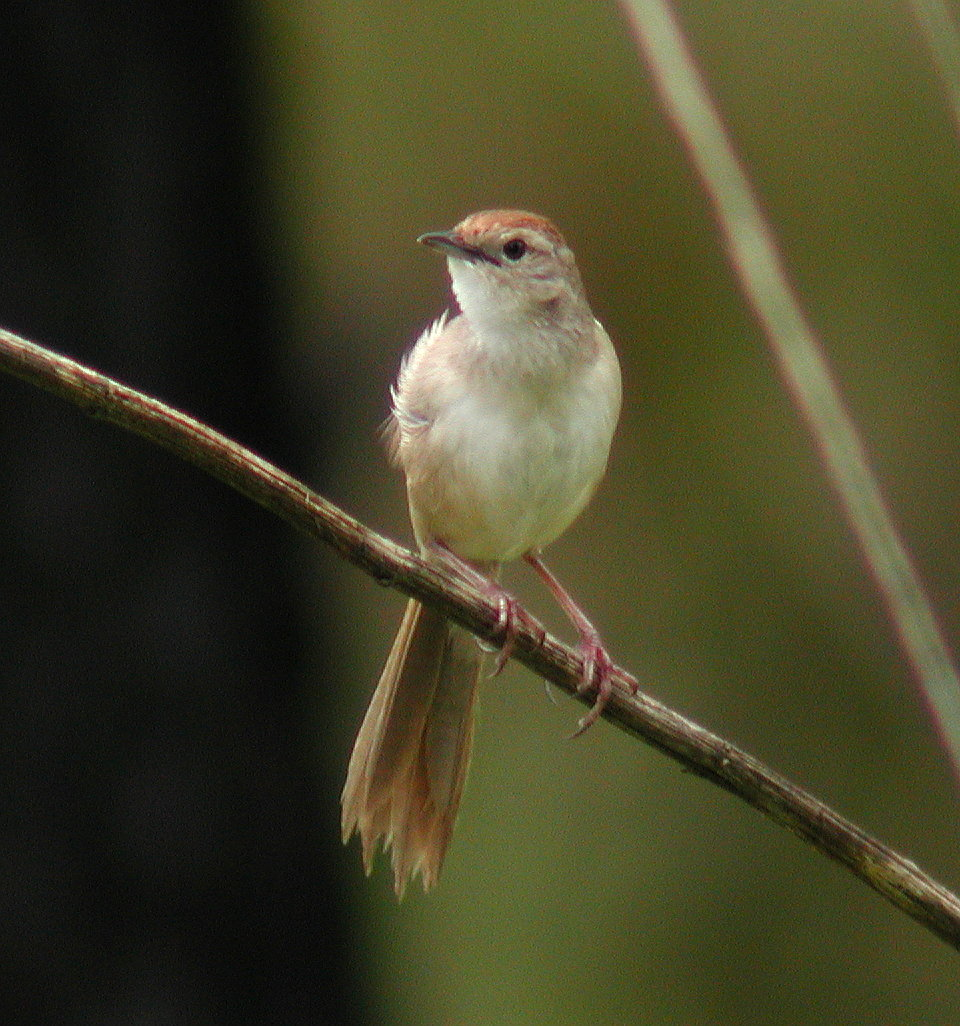
- In Samsonvale, SE Queensland, Australia

Conservation status
- Least Concern (IUCN 3.1)

Scientific classification
- Kingdom: Animalia
- Phylum: Chordata
- Class: Aves
- Order: Passeriformes
- Family: Locustellidae
- Genus: Cincloramphus
- Species: C. timoriensis

Binomial name
- Cincloramphus timoriensis (Wallace, 1864)

Synonyms
- Megalurus timoriensis

= Tawny grassbird =

Species of bird

The tawny grassbird (Cincloramphus timoriensis) is a large songbird that is a member of the family Locustellidae commonly found in grassland and reedbed habitats. It is streaked above and has a distinctive rich brown cap. Its underside is paler and it has a long graduated tail. They call often with "loud, grumpy churring calls and a longer call that starts tick-tick-tick-tick and ends with an explosive descending trill".

The tawny grassbird has 10 identified sub-species found in Australia, Indonesia, Papua New Guinea and the Philippines.

== Taxonomy ==
The family Locustellidae was named by Bonaparte in 1854 and is derived from the genus name Locustella named by Kemp in 1829. The term "grassbird" was used by Gould during the mid 19th century to signify a strong correlation to long grass habitats. The tawny grassbird has also been known as tawny sphenoeacus, grassbird, tawny or rufous-capped marshbird, rufous-capped grass-warbler and rufous-capped grassbird. Grass-warbler tends to be used in Asia rather than Australia. Genetic studies indicate a close relationship to songlarks.

Ten subspecies are recognised:

- C. t. tweeddalei (McGregor, RC, 1908) – Philippines (Luzon, Panay, Tablas, Marinduque, Ticao, and Negros)
- C. t. alopex (Parkes, KC, 1970) – Philippines (Bohol, Cebu, and Leyte)
- C. t. amboinensis (Salvadori, AT, 1876) – Ambon (southern Moluccas)
- C. t. crex (Salomonsen, F, 1953) – southern Philippines (Mindanao and Camiguin Sur)
- C. t. mindorensis (Salomonsen, F, 1953) – Mindoro (Philippines)
- C. t. celebensis (Riley, JH, 1919) – north-central Sulawesi
- C. t. inquirendus (Siebers, HC, 1928) – Sumba (Lesser Sunda Islands)
- C. t. timoriensis (Wallace, AR, 1864) – Timor (eastern Lesser Sunda Islands)
- C. t. muscalis (Rand, AL, 1938) – southern New Guinea (Middle Fly River region)
- C. t. alisteri (Mathews, GM, 1912) – northern and eastern Australia (Kimberley region, northern Western Australia, to central Victoria)

The subspecies C. t. alisteri has been divided into C. t. alisteri (alisteri) located in Eastern Australia and C. t. alisteri (oweni) located in Northern Australia.

While the family name Locustellidae is generally accepted some authorities place the tawny grassbird in the family Sylviidae. Also the genus name Cincloramphus is normally used but megalurus is also commonly used.

== Description ==
The tawny grassbird is a medium sized grassbird with a wingspan of 56-69mm, a stout bill 14-17mmand weighs around 13-25g. The bird has an unstreaked rufous (rich brown) cap, obvious rufous fringes to flight feathers on the folded wing and wholly unstreaked underparts. It also has a long drooping tail and rufous rump. The male has a varied song given in both display flights and from exposed perches. The males sing mostly in spring and summer.

The tawny grassbird is distinguished from the related little grassbird by its larger size, stouter bill, more rufous plumage and longer tail.

== Distribution and habitat ==
Within Australia the tawny grassbird is mainly found on "coastal lowlands in rank grasslands, sedges reeds and rushes" and bordering wetlands In 2011 a population of tawny grassbirds was located in Alice Springs, almost a 100 km from other populations. Generally, grassbirds found in inland Eastern Australia are little grassbirds.

== Behaviour ==
=== Feeding ===
Tawny grassbirds feed on insects.

=== Vocalisation ===
The Slater Field Guide notes the voice is a rich ch-ch-ch-zzzzzzt lik lik: loud see-lick: high-pitched descending trill. In flight, it has "metallic chuck chuck chuck." The Australian Bird Guide describes displaying males with a "delightful varied song, given both in display flights and from exposed perches. Its alarm call is a repeated "harsh tjik or jk-jk".

=== Reproduction ===
Tawny grassbirds nest in long grass in well hidden cups of grass. They generally lay 3 freckled reddish eggs.

== Status and conservation ==
The species is rated Least Concern (LC) as it has an extensive range, the population appears to be stable and although the population size has not been quantified, it is not believed that it is approaching Vulnerable. Some concern has been expressed for a decline in populations because of persistent grazing of tall grasses but in New Guinea it was observed that population density was greater in shorter grazed grass than the neighbouring taller grasses.
