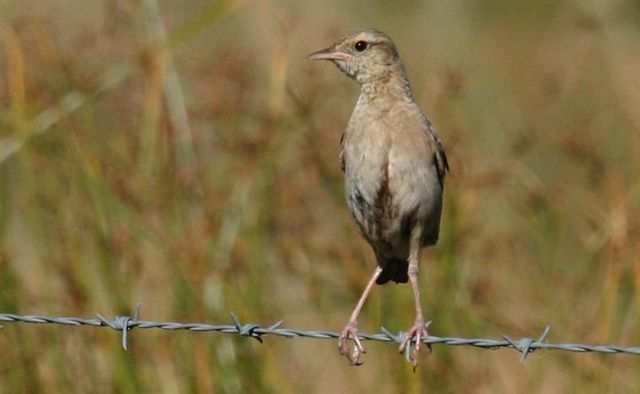
- male, near Baradine, New South Wales

Conservation status
- Least Concern (IUCN 3.1)

Scientific classification
- Kingdom: Animalia
- Phylum: Chordata
- Class: Aves
- Order: Passeriformes
- Family: Locustellidae
- Genus: Cincloramphus
- Species: C. cruralis

Binomial name
- Cincloramphus cruralis (Vigors & Horsfield, 1827)

Synonyms
- Megalurus cruralis (protonym)

= Brown songlark =

Species of bird

The brown songlark (Cincloramphus cruralis), also Australian songlark, is a small passerine bird found throughout much of Australia. A member of the family Locustellidae, this species is notable for sexual size dimorphism, among the most pronounced in any bird. It is a moderate-sized bird of nondescript plumage; the female brownish above and paler below, the larger male a darker brown.

== Taxonomy ==
The brown songlark was described by Nicholas Aylward Vigors and Thomas Horsfield as Megalurus cruralis in 1827. John Gould placed it in the genus Cincloramphus in 1843, describing it as C. cantatoris. However, the specific name of the former authors took priority. Along with most Old-World Warblers, this species was formerly placed in Sylviidae sensu lato, but molecular phylogenetic studies demonstrated that this broad grouping is not a cohesive evolutionary lineage and warbler species were assigned to various families.

An alternative generic name Cinclorhamphus is derived from Greek words cinclus/κιγκλος "wagtail" and ramphos/ραμφος "beak" and cruralis from the Latin root crur- "leg, shin".

== Description ==
Male brown songlarks are 23–25 cm long versus 18–19 cm for females and may weigh 2.3 times as much. The average weight of males was listed as 74.8 g (2.64 oz) and that of females is 32.4 g (1.14 oz). They are probably the most sexually dimorphic passerine in the world in size difference, as well as likely the largest species in the family Locustellidae. In general, the birds have a dusky pale-streaked with darker brown plumage and pale eyebrows. The underparts are brownish-white in the female, darker brown in the male. Breeding males may display a cinnamon colour. The eyes and bill are black, and the legs grey. Juveniles are smaller and paler with pinkish-brown bills. The call has been described as loud and creaky. The male is the principal singer, calling from perches or when rising above breeding territory.

== Distribution and habitat ==
The bird is found throughout Australia, except for parts of the far north and Tasmania. There are particularly dense populations in the southern parts of the country. It prefers open pastures and grassy scrub, and feeds on seeds and insects. The species is highly nomadic. Local numbers fluctuate depending on rainfall and the bird will often flee from drought-affected areas.

The brown songlark has a large range, between 1,000,000 and 10,000,000 km²; while population size has not been quantified the bird is reported to be common. The IUCN thus lists it as a species of least concern and it is considered "secure" by Australian authorities.

== Reproduction ==
Nesting occurs from August to December. The nest itself is a deep cup of herbaceous material well concealed in shrubbery or tall grass. There is generally one clutch per breeding season, consisting of 2 to 5 pale pink eggs, 23 mm x 17 mm in size, with reddish brown spots and flecks. Females provide most of the parenting. Foxes and snakes prey upon nests.

=== Sexual dimorphism ===
The sexual dimorphism of the species has been the subject of study. Males are highly polygynous and compete directly for mates, giving rise to the pronounced size differential. Preferring open terrain, there is significant habitat homogeneity (sameness) and excellent visibility across brown songlark territories. This allows males to defend large territories and support multiple nesting females.

Research has shown an interesting corollary to the dimorphism of the species: though males are larger than females, females hatch from larger eggs and are initially heavier than their brothers. That may provide them an early competitive advantage. Particularly, in periods of low food availability, the greater nutrient reserves of female hatchlings may skew the sex-ratio toward "cheaper" daughters.

Three weeks after hatching, male chicks are significantly heavier than the females. After ten days, the male chicks are almost 50% heavier than their sisters. That is due to the male nestlings receiving a higher quantity and quality of food from their parents. The males receive more spiders than their sisters, providing them with certain amino acids that are essential for their growth and development. The females receive more grasshoppers than spiders, which contain chitin (the indigestible carbohydrate of the exoskeleton). Studies have shown that, when raising all male chicks, the females energy expenditure increases by 27%. The favouritism shown to the male chicks is due to the importance of body size in males in regard to reproductive success, ensuring the parents genes are well represented in future generations.

== Gallery ==
Male bird at Bryden, south-east Queensland, Australia

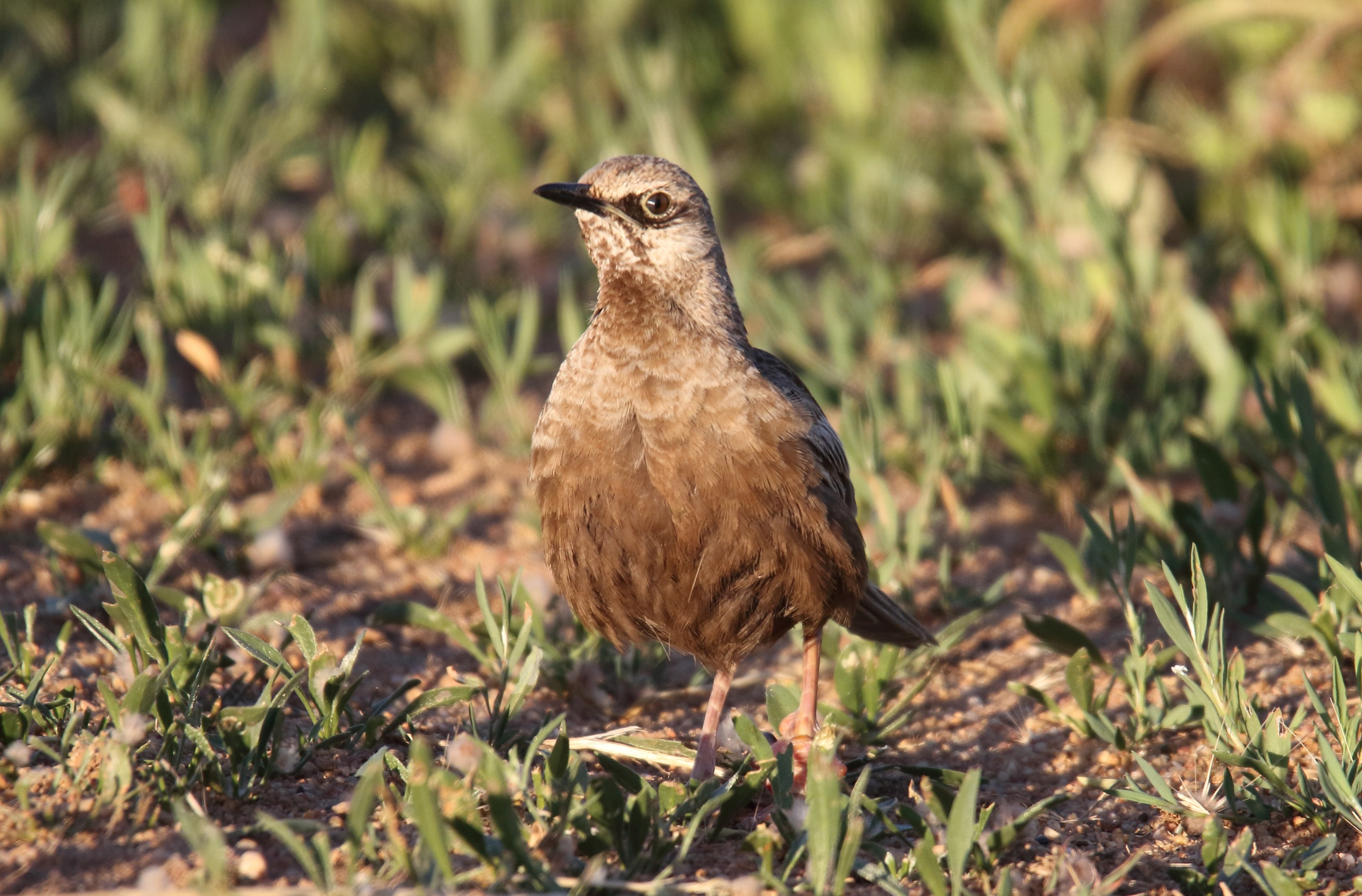
