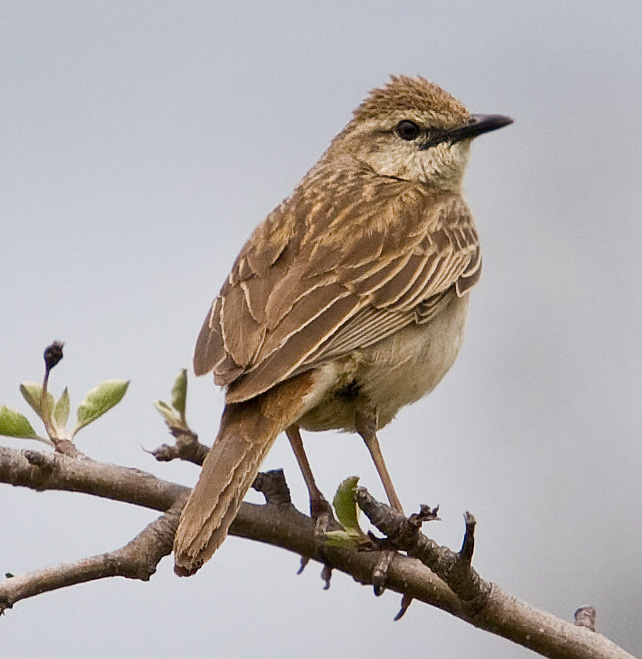
- Rufous songlark (Cincloramphus mathewsi)

Scientific classification
- Kingdom: Animalia
- Phylum: Chordata
- Class: Aves
- Order: Passeriformes
- Family: Locustellidae
- Genus: Cincloramphus; Gould, 1838

Type species
- Megalurus cruralis Vigors & Horsfield, 1827

Synonyms
- Megalurulus Verreaux, J, 1869; Buettikoferella Stresemann, 1928

= Cincloramphus =

Genus of birds

Cincloramphus is a genus of birds in the grassbird family Locustellidae.

The genus Cincloramphus was introduced by the English ornithologist and bird artist John Gould in 1838 with the brown songlark as the type species. The name combines the Ancient Greek kinklos meaning "thrush" with rhamphos meaning "bill".

A comprehensive molecular phylogenetic study of the family Locustellidae published in 2018 found that many of the genera were non-monophyletic. In the resulting reorganization the genera Megalurulus and Buettikoferella became junior synonyms of the resurrected genus Cincloramphus.

The genus now contains the following twelve species:

Image	Common name	Scientific name
	Brown songlark	Cincloramphus cruralis
	Rufous songlark	Cincloramphus mathewsi
	Rusty thicketbird	Cincloramphus rubiginosus
	New Britain thicketbird	Cincloramphus grosvenori
	Buff-banded thicketbird	Cincloramphus bivittatus
	Papuan grassbird	Cincloramphus macrurus
	Tawny grassbird	Cincloramphus timoriensis
	Guadalcanal thicketbird	Cincloramphus turipavae
	Santo thicketbird	Cincloramphus whitneyi
	New Caledonian thicketbird	Cincloramphus mariae
	Long-legged thicketbird	Cincloramphus rufus
	Bougainville thicketbird	Cincloramphus llaneae
