= Cave (surname) =

Cave is a surname, and may refer to:

- Alexander Cave (1900–2001), British anatomist
- Alfred A. Cave (1935–2019), American historian
- Ambrose Cave (died 1568), English politician
- Andrew Cave-Brown (born 1988), Scottish footballer
- Andy Cave (born 1966), British mountaineer and author
- Arthur Cave (1883–1948), Irish cleric and badminton player
- Basil Cave (1865–1931), British diplomat
- Bebe Cave (born 1997), English actress
- Bertha Cave (1881–1951), English legal campaigner
- Bob Cave (1888–1943), Australian rules footballer
- Candida Cave, British painter, playwright and art historian
- Carmen Vali-Cave (born 1965), American politician from California
- Caroline Cave, Canadian actor
- Sir Charles Cave, 1st Baronet (1832–1922), British banker
- Sir Charles Cave, 2nd Baronet (1861–1932)
- Sir Charles Cave, 4th Baronet (1927–1997)
- Charles John Philip Cave (1871–1950), British meteorologist
- Charles Haddon-Cave (born 1956), British judge
- Christo Cave (born 1961), Trinidadian chess player
- Colby Cave (1994–2020), Canadian ice hockey player
- Daniel Cave (born 1999), Australian swimmer
- Darren Cave (born 1987), Irish rugby union footballer
- Earl Cave (born 2000), British actor
- E. W. Cave (Eber Worthington Cave) (1831–1904), American journalist and politician from Texas
- Edward Cave (1691–1754), English printer, editor and publisher
- Emma Cave (born 1974), British legal scholar
- Estella Cave, Countess Cave of Richmond (1856–1938), English author, spouse of George Cave, 1st Viscount Cave
- Etosha Cave, American mechanical engineer
- Francis Oswin Cave (1897–1974), English army officer, Catholic priest and ornithologist
- François Morellon la Cave (1696–1768), French painter and engraver in Amsterdam
- Frank Cave (1942–2002), British trade unionist and political activist
- George Cave (footballer) (1874–1904), English footballer
- George W. Cave (born 1929), American CIA officer
- George Cave, 1st Viscount Cave (1856–1928), British lawyer and politician
- Harry Cave (1922–1989), New Zealand cricketer
- Henry William Cave (1854–1913), British author and photographer
- Hugh B. Cave (1910–2004), American pulp fiction writer
- Ian Cave (born 1966), British Army officer
- Jake Cave (born 1992), American baseball player
- Jane Cave (c. 1754–1812), Welsh poet writing in English
- Jean-Pierre Cave (1952–2017), French politician
- Jeanette Cave (born 1949), English swimmer
- Jennie Cave (1902–2001), American politician from Connecticut
- Jesse S. Cave (1872–1948), American business executive and politician
- Jessie Cave (born 1987), English actress, comedian and author
- Jennifer Cave (died 2005), American female murder victim, see Murder of Jennifer Cave
- John Cave (rugby union) (1867–1949), English rugby union player footballer
- J. A. Cave (Joseph Arnold Cave) (c.1823–1912), English musician, actor and theatre proprietor
- Joyce Cave (1902–1953), English squash player
- Kathryn Cave (born 1948), British children's book author
- Kenneth Cave (1874–1944), New Zealand cricket umpire
- Kyle Cave, American psychologist
- Leanda Cave (born 1978), British triathlete
- Leonard Cave (1944–2006), American sculptor
- Lewis Cave (1832–1897), British judge
- Lucie Cave (born 1972), English journalist
- Mabel Cave (1863–1953), British nursing leader
- Marion Elizabeth Stilwell Cave (1904–1995), American plant embryologist and cytogeneticist
- Matt Cave (1910–1975), Australian rules footballer
- Micky Cave (1949–84), English footballer
- Mike Cave (born 1978), British musician, record producer and mix engineer
- Mimi Cave, American filmmaker and film producer
- Nancy Cave (1896–1989), English squash player
- Nick Cave (born 1957), leader of the Australian rock band Nick Cave and the Bad Seeds
- Nick Cave (performance artist) (born 1959), American artist
- Nicolaes Cave (fl.1619–1651), Flemish still-life painter
- Patrick Cave (born 1965), British novelist and hypnotherapist
- Peter Cave, Australian journalist
- Phil Cave (born 1987), English footballer
- Phil Cave, founder of Australian private equity company Anchorage Capital Partners
- Richard Cave (died 1645), English politician
- Robert Otway-Cave (1796–1844), Irish politician
- Roger Cave (1655–1703), English politician and baronet
- Sarah Otway-Cave, 3rd Baroness Braye (1768–1862), English noblewoman
- Stan Cave (born 1963), American politician from Kentucky
- Stephen Cave (1820–1880), British lawyer, writer and politician
- Susie Cave (born 1966), English fashion designer
- Terence Cave (born 1938), British literary scholar
- Thomas Cave (died 1609) (c.1540–1609), English landowner and Member of Parliament
- Thomas Cave (Liberal politician) (1825–1894), British politician
- Thomas Cave (merchant) (died 1603), English cloth merchant
- Thomas H. Cave (1870–1958), American politician from Vermont
- Sir Thomas Cave, 3rd Baronet (1681–1719), British politician
- Sir Thomas Cave, 5th Baronet (1712–1778), British lawyer and politician
- Sir Thomas Cave, 7th Baronet (1766–1792), British politician
- Tom Cave (born 1991), British rally driver
- Tyson Cave (born 1981), Canadian boxer
- Vernal G. Cave (1918–1997), American doctor, official and activist in New York
- Vincent Cave (fl.1669), Irish Anglican priest
- Walter Cave (1863–1939), English architect
- Wilbur Cave, American politician from South Carolina
- William Cave (1637–1713), English cleric and scholar
- William Cave (rugby union) (1882–1970), England rugby union footballer
- William H. Cave (1872–1941), Newfoundland merchant and politician
- W. R. Cave (William Rendall Cave) (1842–1916), grain merchant and shipowner in South Australia

== See also ==
- Cavé
- Cave-Browne-Cave
