= Category killer =

Retailer with a large product range

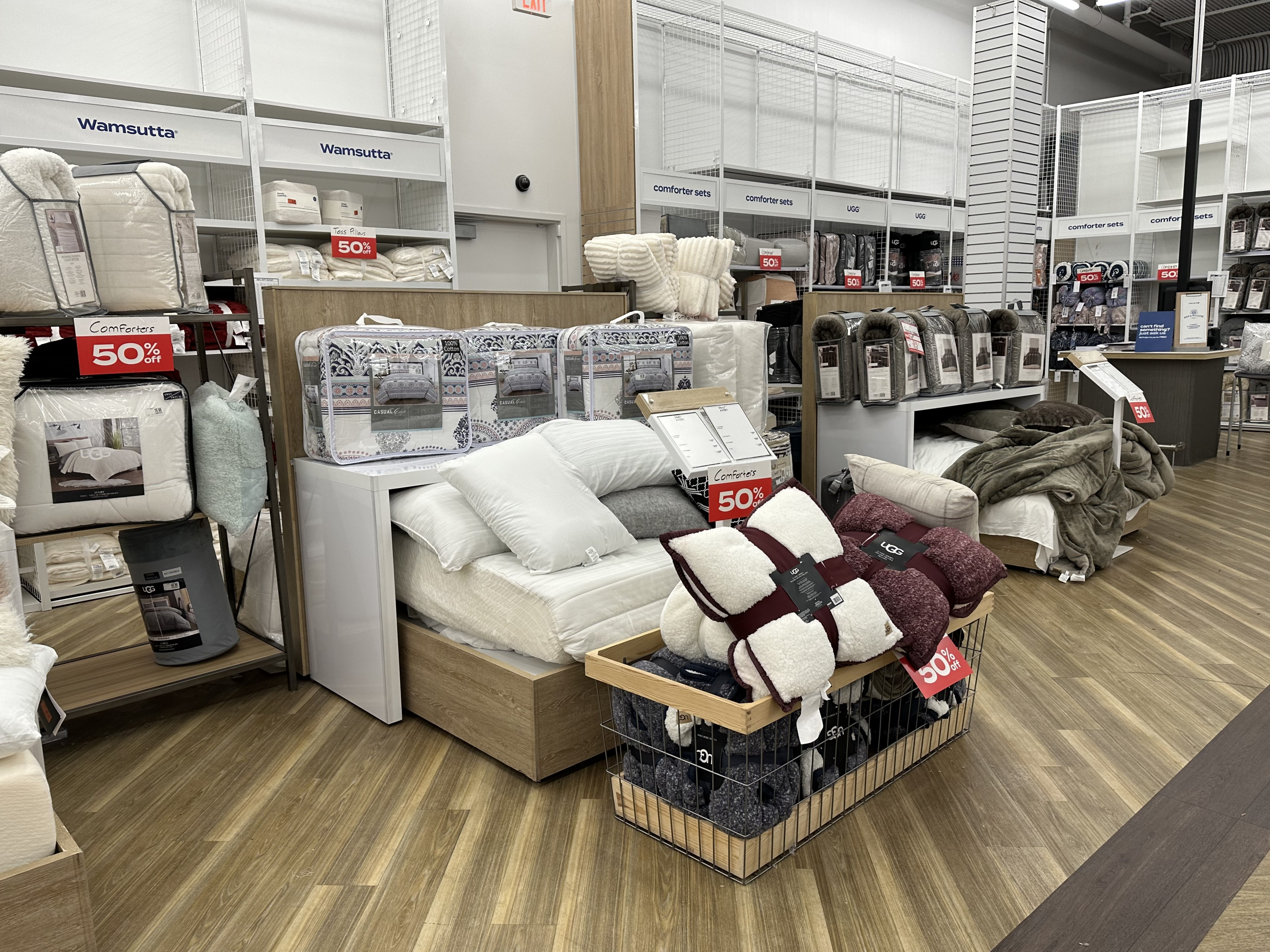
Product shelves in an outlet of Bed Bath & Beyond

A category killer is a type of retailer, usually a big-box store, that specializes in a single product category and carries a wide assortment of related goods. By offering extensive selections, competitive pricing, and leveraging large-scale bargaining power, these stores often gain a comparative advantage over smaller retailers and can significantly reduce competitors’ sales within that category, increasing their market penetration.

They are generally described as discount-oriented specialist mass retailers. Examples include chains such as OfficeMax, Best Buy, Barnes & Noble, and Hobby Lobby.

Category killers were once most commonly located in power centers, but are now often found within or adjacent to repurposed shopping malls.

Large category killer stores are typically located in mid- to large-sized cities, where sufficient population density supports their operations.

== Impact ==
Local merchants in cities with category killers "may suffer a substantial reduction in sales," and stores in a wider radius can be affected by the draw. Between 1983 and 1993, Iowans spent 31% less in hardware stores, translating to a loss of 37% in the same time to those stores as a result of category killer stores.

== United States retailers ==
Sporting goods stores that are category killers range in footprint from 10,000 to 40,000 square feet (930 to 3,720 m^{2}).Home Depot carries 30,000 items in 100,000-square-foot (9,300 m^{2}) stores.

Examples of retailers considered to be category killers
Retailer	Category	Defunct
The Home Depot	Home and construction	
Lowe's	Home and construction	
Builders Square	Home and construction	1999 (stores); 2009 (brand)
Home Quarters	Home and construction	1999
Circuit City	Electronics	2009 (stores); 2012 (brand)
Best Buy	Electronics	
Toys "R" Us	Toys	2018 - 2021 (US stores)
Barnes & Noble	Books	
Borders	Books	2011
OfficeMax	Office supplies	
Office Depot	Office supplies	
Staples	Office supplies	
Petco	Pet supplies	
PetSmart	Pet supplies	
Party City	Party supplies	2024
The Gap	Clothing	
Old Navy	Clothing	

== See also ==
- Big-box store
