= Pat Hall =

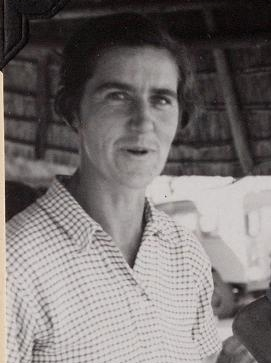
Hall in Rhodesia, 1957 photographed by Alexander Wetmore

Beryl Patricia Hall, née Woodhouse (13 June 1917 – 26 August 2010) was a British ornithologist, associated with the Natural History Museum. She is best known for her work on African birds. She also wrote a book of whimsical poems with Derek Goodwin called the Bird Room Ballads (1969).

== Life ==
Pat grew up in Epsom, Surrey, born in an upper-middle-class family. Her ambition was to study mathematics at Cambridge but she failed to pursue it due to opposition from her parents. Forced to spend several years at home, she took to watching birds and then decided to sign up for the Women's Legion in 1939. Her work involved teaching ambulance driving and precautions during Air Raids. She got engaged to John Hall, a lieutenant in the army who was posted in the Middle East. She was initially posted to South Africa and she transferred to Egypt in March 1941 allowing her to marry John.

After the war she returned to the UK and in 1947, following a failed marriage, she took up a position as a scientific associate at the bird room of the Natural History Museum. She obtained the job after meeting Sir Norman Kinnear who was a friend of her cousin Alfred Hughes. She then joined an expedition to southern and south-western Africa in 1949 along with James Macdonald and Colonel F. O. Cave. Working for half a year, they collected 1300 specimens of nearly 200 species of bird. She went on several self-funded expeditions in 1953 to northern Bechuanaland and another to Angola in 1957. She led the Harold Hall expedition to Australia based on her experience in arid zones in 1965.

She worked on a number of African bird groups including the francolins. Her major work was An Atlas of Speciation in African Passerine Birds (1970) in collaboration with R.E. Moreau. She also wrote two books based on her war years in Africa What a Way to Win a War (1978) and A Hawk from a Handsaw (1993). Along with Derek Goodwin, she also wrote a series of whimsical poems Bird Room Ballads which were based on their activities in the bird section of the British Museum.

Pat was a member of the Committee of the British Ornithologists’ Club from 1955 to 1964 and an Assistant Editor of the Ibis from 1971 to 1973. In 1973, she gave the Witherby Memorial Lecture on the subject of 'Speciation and specialisation'.

She received the Gill Memorial Medal and the Stamford Raffles Award in 1971 as well as a BOU medal in 1973. She was invited to preside over the 4th Pan African Ornithological Congress in 1976. A species named by Russian-born ornithologist Alexandre Prigogine (1913–1991) after her as "Hall's greenbul" (Eurillas hallae) is now considered to be a melanistic specimen of little greenbul.
