= David Furchgott =

American businessman (born 1947)

David Max Furchgott (born May 24, 1947) is a United States nonprofit cultural programs manager, arts educator, publisher, and cultural social entrepreneur.

== Origin, education, and career beginning ==
David Furchgott was born in Charleston, South Carolina, to Marcelle and Max Furchgott. His forebears (originally spelled Fürchtgott) moved from Central Europe in the late 19th century to the United States in 1864, eventually settling in Charleston (as well as Atlanta, Georgia and Jacksonville, Florida). They began an early chain of family-owned sundry (department) stores. David Furchgott's father was a trained artist and photographer who studied at the University of South Carolina and the Art Students League in NY; his uncle was Robert F. Furchgott, the 1998 Nobel Laureate in Medicine and Physiology.

David Furchgott graduated M. Rutledge Rivers High School in Charleston, the first integrated high school in South Carolina. Furchgott was the president of the Southeast Federation of Temple Youth, the five-state regional consortium of the Reform Jewish youth movement (now NFTY) which was then focused on issues related to social justice and equality.

In 1965, Furchgott attended Tulane University intending to study Architecture, then transferred to the University of Miami, graduating with a Bachelor of Education in Art Education in January 1970, and an incomplete Bachelor of Fine Arts. Having undergone a difficult process to be recognized as a Vietnam-era conscientious objector, Furchgott was required to return to South Carolina to complete two years of public service. He taught as an arts and crafts instructor at the South Carolina Habilitation Center in Ladson, SC; a facility for developmentally disabled children and adults. During that same period, he helped to start and was the first director of Furthur, Inc., a nonprofit organization that began and operated the Charleston Hotline, which he continued to direct for the following year. The Hotline has continued for over 40 years, now under the auspices of the Trident United Way.

== Early art career ==
In 1972, Furchgott was hired by the Gibbes Art Gallery (now the Gibbes Museum of Art, Charleston's community art museum) as its Curator of Education and Director of its then-financially failing Hastings School of Art. In less than two years Furchgott "more than doubled the school's enrollment" and secured its finances, began a children's art class program, a resource newsletter for public school art instructors, quadrupled the museum's tour program, and initiated a number of public education programs for the museum in community centers and public spaces.

Furchgott was recruited by the South Carolina Arts Commission in Spring 1974, to head its Contemporary Arts Division (later called "Community Arts"). Beginning with a broad mandate to get the arts to all the people of South Carolina, a division budget of $72,000, and a staff of two full-time employees, over four years Furchgott built the division to a full-time staff of 52, with programs throughout the state. Nationally recognized among these programs were the Arts Truck and the Crafts Truck, mobile artist's teaching studios that traveled to rural communities; a Crafts Marketing program that helped revitalize the Sweet Grass basketry of the Carolina Low Country; a Prison Arts Program, recognized as a leading national model by the US Department of Justice's Law Enforcement Assistance Administration; and others. Furchgott announced his retirement from the South Carolina Arts Commission in 1978.

== Early national and international activities ==
In 1979, Furchgott was hired by philanthropist / sculptor J. Seward Johnson, Jr., then board president of the newly incorporated International Sculpture Center, to organize the Eleventh International Sculpture Conference and Exhibition to be held in Washington in the Summer of 1980. Under the tutelage of noted curator Walter Hopps and others, that event evolved to become the most expansive temporary presentation of international outdoor sculpture ever previously assembled in the US, with 88 mostly public-scale works presented from around the world. The event reputedly had over 2,700 in attendance and offered 64 panel presentations of groups of internationally known sculptors, curators, and collectors. Following that, the board of the International Sculpture Center hired Furchgott as its executive director to develop the organization. He began a membership program that reached individuals in more than 70 countries by 1995; started the International Sculpture Center Bulletin which evolved into the internationally-distributed Sculpture magazine (the fourth largest fine arts magazine of that time); started "Sculpture Source" (thought to be the first image/data based computerized artists registry); and an international traveling exhibitions program that brought major exhibitions of Frank Lloyd Wright, David Smith, Peter Voulkos and others to Japan and Europe.

In late Spring of 1995, Furchgott served as the visual art director of Spoleto Festival USA featuring, among other exhibitions, Japanese Contemporary Clayworks, and 20th-Century American Sculpture at the White House.

== Establishing international arts and artists ==
In 1995, after 15 years, Furchgott left the International Sculpture Center to form International Arts & Artists, a non-profit organization based in Washington DC devoted to international and cross cultural exchange. IA&A provides Traveling Exhibition Services to museums, cultural institutions, artists, and arts-involved individuals along with the general public. Among its initial projects, Furchgott organized an exhibition on contemporary American artists from diverse backgrounds at the Setagaya Art Museum in Tokyo, Japan which toured to other locations in Japan. Additionally, Furchgott organized the inaugural art exhibition at the Museum of African American History in Detroit (now Charles H. Wright Museum of African American History). Since its creation, IA&A has coordinated more than "800 exhibition presentations at nearly 500 museums and cultural institutions in all 50 states and numerous foreign countries, including Australia, Brazil, Canada, Denmark, Ireland, Japan, Spain, Sweden, Switzerland, and the United Kingdom."

Among the exhibitions for which Furchgott was directly responsible was the 2002 US representation at the São Paulo Biennial of Kara Walker's "Slavery, Slavery," visited by over 400,000 people. Furchgott also arranged "Paris Moderne: Art Deco Works From the Musee D'Art Moderne De La Ville De Paris" at the Bass Museum of Art for the 2004 Art Basel Miami show.

IA&A owns the John W. Hechinger Collection, which was donated to the organization in 2003 by John Hechinger Sr. This acquisition was overseen by David Furchgott.

=== Additional programs ===
Subsequent to the beginning of the Traveling Exhibition Services department, Furchgott began a Cultural Exchange Program within IA&A to allow for training and internships for foreign students and graduates in performing and visual arts institutions. This program has since brought over 1,000 people to the US. IA&A also operates IAA&A at Hillyer, a contemporary art space located in Washington DC.

== Bibliography ==
- Furchgott, David M.; Arman; Tanguy, Sarah; John W. Hechinger Collection; Hechinger Company (2002). Tools as Art – The Hechinger Collection. Washington, D.C.: International Arts & Artists. ISBN 978-0-966-28591-8.
- The News & Courier (Charleston SC), Friday, February 14, 1979.
- Max Furchgott, College of Charleston, Special Collections
- The News and Courier (Charleston SC) April 2, 1972. "Counseling Group Expanding Scope"
- The News and Courier (Charleston SC) May 7, 1974. "Furchgott Will Join S.C. Arts Commission"

== See also ==
- International Arts and Artists
- Sculpture magazine
- List of people from Washington, D.C.
