= International Arts & Artists =

Nonprofit organization based in the U.S.

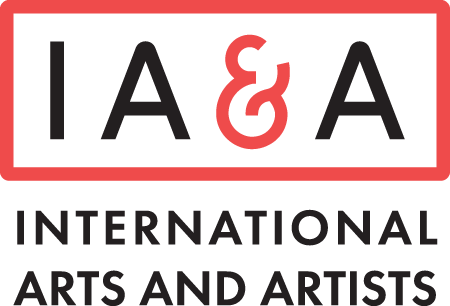

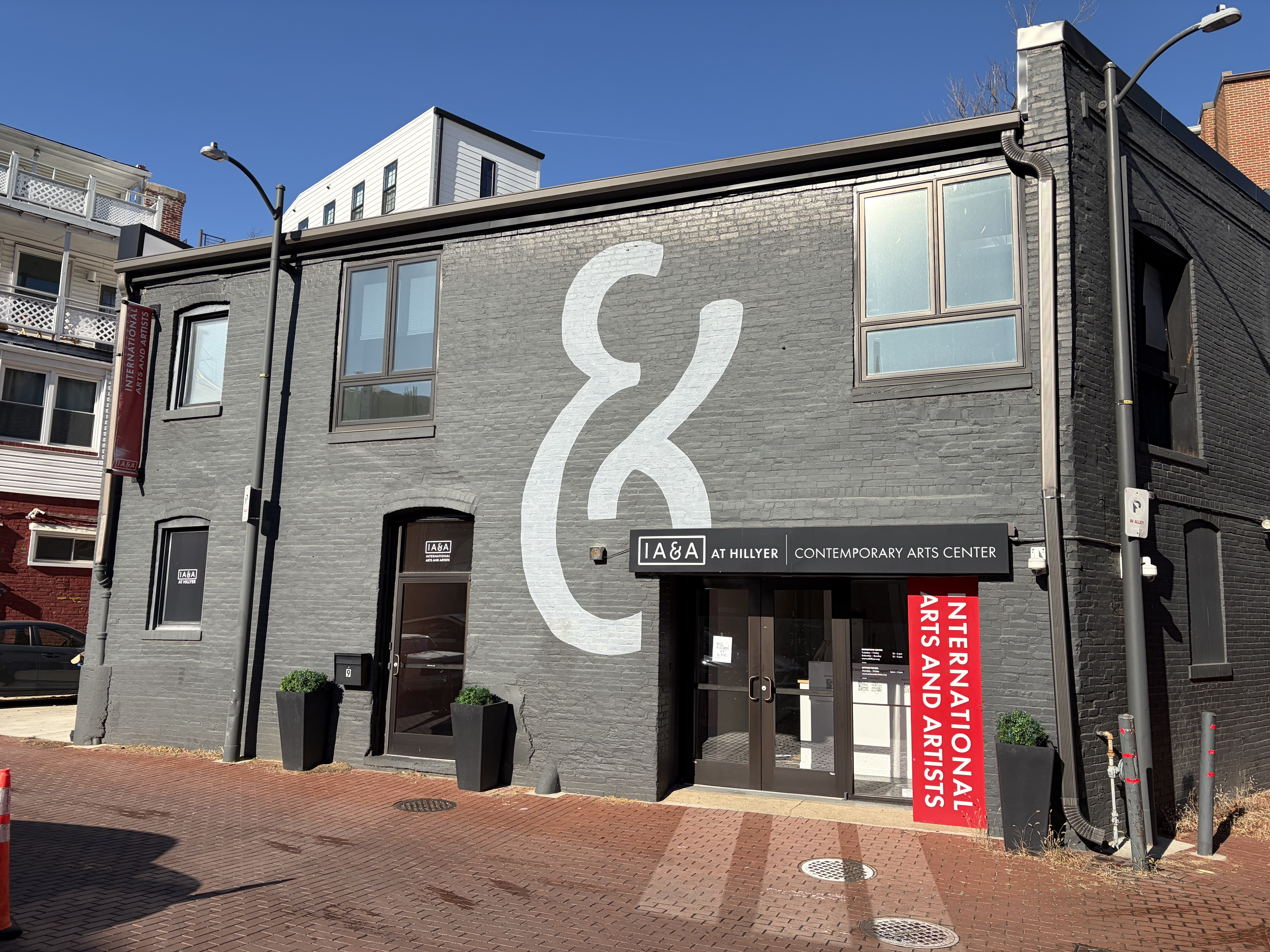
- IA&A at Hillyer gallery in DuPont Circle, Washington, D.C.
- Abbreviation: IA&A
- Formation: 1995; 31 years ago
- Website: artsandartists.org

International Arts & Artists (IA&A) is an international, nonprofit arts service organization based in Washington, D.C., United States that is "dedicated to increasing cross-cultural understanding and exposure to the arts internationally" according to its mission statement.

IA&A helps museums, foundations, and private collectors share and exchange a diverse range of art through traveling exhibition services. IA&A is a sponsor for J-1 visas to individuals across the arts industries through their cultural exchange training programs, professional development, and exhibition services. IA&A owns and operates IA&A at Hillyer, a contemporary art space in Dupont Circle, Washington DC.

On view in IA&A's Washington office are select works from Tools as Art: The Hechinger Collection. Consisting of over 350 works of art, the collection was donated in its entirety to IA&A in 2003 by John S. Hechinger, founder of the Hechinger Company.

== History and Structure ==
IA&A is a registered 501(c)(3) entity and its offices and exhibition space are located in Washington, D.C.'s Dupont Circle. IA&A was founded by David Furchgott in 1995, and began Traveling Exhibition services at this time.

In 2003, hardware-industry pioneer John Hechinger, Sr. donated his collection of over 350 works of twentieth-century art to IA&A.

In 2004, IA&A received a unique designation from the US Department of State for its Cultural Exchange Programs to sponsor J-1 visas for international interns, trainees, and scholars placed in cultural institutions throughout the US.

In 2006, IA&A opened Hillyer Art Space (now IA&A at Hillyer). In the same year, the sculptures of Leonard Cave were willed to the IA&A.

In 2014, IA&A purchased and renovated the 1850s-era former livery stable in Dupont Circle that it had occupied as an office/exhibition site for over a decade, providing a permanent home for the organization and Hillyer.

In November, 2017, Founder and President David Furchgott announced his intention to retire. He stepped down from his role as President in January, 2019.

In March 2020, the COVID-19 pandemic hit and the organization faced a period of instability. During this time IA&A minimized their Cultural Exchange Program due to travel restrictions, suspended their Design Studio Program and programs at Hillyer Art Space, and greatly reduced their staff.

David Furchgott came out of retirement to become Interim President of IA&A following the resignation of his successor in October 2020.

In November 2021, Hillyer Art Space was reopened as IA&A at Hillyer.

== Traveling exhibitions ==
The Traveling Exhibition Services department of International Arts & Artists "is the producer of the largest number of fine arts and decorative arts touring exhibitions in the US," which it develops and circulates to large and small museums and public institutions throughout North America and abroad. The exhibitions cover a range of art and cultural concepts from both international and American artists, additionally compiling works from significant collections and art movements worldwide. Since 1995, IA&A has coordinated "more than 800 exhibition presentations at nearly 500 museums and cultural institutions in all 50 states and numerous foreign countries, including Australia, Brazil, Canada, Denmark, Ireland, Japan, Spain, Sweden, Switzerland, and the United Kingdom." The organization assists in all stages of exhibition planning and presentation from concept development and loan procurement, to venue selection, exhibition catalogue production and transportation arrangements.

=== Notable exhibitions ===
By 2020, International Arts & Artists toured over 100 exhibitions around the US and abroad. These include:

- Man Ray: African Art and the Modernist Lens, traveled to museums around North America to The Phillips Collection, the University of New Mexico Art Museum, the University of Virginia Art Museum and the Museum of Anthropology at the University of British Columbia. The exhibition includes photographs of American artist Man Ray by contemporaries such as Charles Sheeler, Walker Evans, Clara Sipprell, Cecil Beaton and Raoul Ubac.
- Intent to Deceive: Fakes and Forgeries in The Art World. This exhibit toured around the U.S. from January 2014 to September 2015, making appearances at the Michele & Donald D'Amour Museum of Fine Arts, the John and Mable Ringling Museum of Art, the Canton Museum of Art, the Oklahoma City Museum of Art, and the Reading Public Museum. This exhibit highlights work by renowned artists including Charles Courtney Curran, Honoré Daumier, Philip de László, Henri Matisse, Amedeo Modigliani, Pablo Picasso, Paul Signac and Maurice de Vlaminck, juxtaposed with some of the forgeries and replicas created by such imitators as Han van Meegeren, Elmyr de Hory, Eric Hebborn, John Myatt and Mark Landis.
- Slavery! Slavery! Kara Walker’s presentation at the Sao Paulo Biennale. Kara Walker served as the official US representative at the 25th Sao Paulo Biennale in 2002, which featured her art: black paper tableaux on themes of slavery and antebellum plantation life. The exhibition was organized by IA&A and curated by Dr. Robert Hobbs, who wrote a book about the exhibit which was published under IA&A's design studio.
- From the Fire: Contemporary Korea Ceramics exhibited at the Victoria & Albert Museum in London in 2011 and toured museums in the US from 2004-2008.
- Marilyn: Celebrating an American Icon toured the US, Brazil, and Australia between 2012 and 2016. CNN described it as an exhibit of "works created by Monroe's famous peers -- Cecil Beaton, Henri Cartier-Bresson, Milton H. Greene and Andy Warhol, to name a few -- and from modern creatives who have taken Monroe as muse."
- Archipenko: A Modern Legacy showcased the art and sculptures of Alexander Archipenko and toured the US, Sweden, and Denmark from 2015 to 2018.
- In Stabiano: Exploring The Ancient Seaside Villas of The Roman Elite was an exhibit consisting of "art objects and artifacts found in four ancient Roman villas" that had been buried in the eruption of Mount Vesuvius. The exhibit toured 8 museums around the US from 2005-2008 including the Dallas Museum of Fine Arts.
- Habsburg Treasures: Renaissance Tapestries from the Kunsthistorisches Museum, Vienna included eight tapestries in the exhibition from two different series: six from the Brussels atelier of Frans Geubels and two from the bequest of French King Francis I (1708–1765). The exhibition toured at the Norton Museum of Art, the Columbia Museum of Art and the John and Mable Ringling Museum of Art.

== IA&A at Hillyer ==
Established in April 2006, IA&A's on-site gallery serves to better accommodate the local Washington, D.C., arts community. For the second year, Hillyer was named Washington's "Best Gallery of 2012" by the Express newspaper. The exhibition space showcases both regional and international exhibitions that feature emerging artists working in a wide array of media. Additionally, the space serves as an open forum for artistic discussions, events and activities catered to the public.

Exhibitions change monthly and feature both emerging and established artists; the exhibitions are solo, group or thematic in orientation. At Hillyer, work from artists living and working in the mid-Atlantic region, particularly the D.C. area, exists alongside the work of their international peers. By exhibiting this variety of international art adjacent to local works, Hillyer creates a dialogue of cultural exchange.

Hillyer determines the majority of their exhibitions through an annual call selected by their Artist Advisory Committee. Selected artists partner with a member from the Advisory Committee as their exhibition date approaches.

Some of Hillyer's past exhibitions include works by Joan Belmar, Solomon Wondimu, Yar Koporulin, Jessika Tarr. and Sergio Izquierdo.

In 2016, artist Kristy Little's “Falling,” a wall sculpture created with wood and wire, was on view at Hillyer Art Space.

In 2017, artist Blaise Tobia exhibited his series "Plain & Fancy" at Hillyer.

In 2018, Australian artist Georgia Saxelby's project, “To Future Women,” which invites participants to write letters to women 20 years in the future, was presented at IA&A at Hillyer.

In 2019, “Starting from the Island, Contemporary Art from Taiwan" was presented at Hillyer. This exhibit featured artist Kuen-Lin Tsai, among others.

== Cultural Exchange Programs ==
IA&A runs an internationally focused career training program. This U.S. Department of State-approved program allows international trainees to partake in professional training within arts and cultural-related organizations throughout the United States. Each year, IA&A provides visa and job-placement assistance to "about 100 young people from overseas to work in cultural organizations of all sorts — dance companies, theater companies, art museums."

== Design Studio ==
IA&A's Design Studio provides print and web design. It offers print, multimedia and web site design services, as well as copywriting and editing. The Design Studio works with IA&A's Traveling Exhibitions department, IA&A at Hillyer, Cultural Exchange Programs and the Membership Program to provide professional graphic design materials.

This program is temporarily suspended as of 2020.

== See also ==
- Washington, D.C.
- Culture of Washington, D.C.
- David Furchgott
- Hechinger Company
- Man Ray
- Kara Walker
- Marilyn Monroe
- Alexander Archipenko
- Joan Belmar
- Blaise Tobia
