= Kohl's Plaza =

Strip mall in Colonie, New York

Coordinates: 42°43′46.4″N 73°50′57.2″W

Kohl's Plaza is a strip mall at 1814 Central Avenue in Colonie, New York which includes the big box store Kohl's and several smaller tenants. It is one of two original locations for Kohl's in the New York Capital Region. Prior to Kohl's arrival in the plaza, it was known as Builder's Square Plaza as Builders Square was the only big box store in the plaza. The plaza has been in place since at least 1990. The Mohawk Drive-in Theatre operated from 1946 to 1986 at this location.

== Ownership ==
The plaza is owned by Colonie Realty Associates NY, LLC of Closter, New Jersey.

== Kohl's ==
Kohl's initially considered New York's Capital Region around 1995. The company finally signed a lease for a store in this plaza and one in Clifton Park, New York, in late 2002. The store in this location is 88,000 square feet. The new store opened on October 10, 2003.

== Builder's Square ==
This particular Builder's Square store was added around 1990.

The Builder's Square chain was closed in 1999. Kmart had owned the chain until 1997. After selling the chain to Hechinger Co., Kmart still owned the lease on this particular store. Kmart's Chapter 11 filing in April, 2002, provided the opportunity to find a new lessee for the store. A retail analyst at the time suggested the building would likely be demolished if a new big box store was to take its place.

The Builder's Square store was 106,000 square feet (9,800 m^{2}) and ultimately was demolished to make room for Kohl's.

== Other Tenants ==
Besides Kohl's and formerly Builder's Square, other tenants over time have included:

- MSS Limited
- O'Toole's Restaurant
- Knight Kitchen Designer Showroom
- OfficeMax
- Manhattan Bagel Co.
- Maurice's Sandwich Shops
- McDonald's
- Starbucks
- Alfred's Fabric Center
