= Cave Johnson (disambiguation) =

Cave Johnson (1793–1866) was an American politician.

Cave Johnson can also refer to:

- Cave Johnson (Portal), fictional character
- Cave Johnson Couts (1821–1874), American soldier

== See also ==
- Cave (name)
