= Birds Australia =

Birds Australia may refer to:

- Royal Australasian Ornithologists Union, trading name Birds Australia
- Birds of Australia, an article about Australian Birds
- List of Australian birds, a list

== See also ==
- The Birds of Australia (disambiguation)
