= John Cave =

John Cave may refer to:

- John Cave (rugby union), English international rugby union player
- William Shakespeare (singer) (1948–2010), Australian glam rock singer, born John Stanley Cave
- Sir John Charles Cave, 5th Baronet (1958–2018), High Sheriff of Devon (2005), of the Cave baronets

== See also ==
- Cave (disambiguation)
