= Peter Slater (ornithologist) =

Australian ornithologist, artist, and photographer (1932–2020)

Peter Slater (17 October 1932 - 28 May 2020) was an Australian ornithologist, wildlife artist and photographer.

Slater grew up in Western Australia and moved to North Queensland in 1966. He began photographing birds from an early age, has won numerous awards in international exhibitions, and was made an Artiste of the Fédération Internationale de l'Art Photographique in 1964. He has produced several natural history books and field guides, often in collaboration with his wife Pat or his son Raoul.

In her 2001 book Feather and Brush, a historical survey of Australian bird painting, Penny Olsen says:

”Naturalist, artist and writer, Peter Slater could be said to be the most modern equivalent of Neville Cayley Jr. Both have published enormously successful field guides to Australian birds, reprinted many times, and both have written on and illustrated butterflies."

"To knowledgeable critics, Slater is now a more accomplished artist than his predecessor. However, this was not yet evident in his early artwork, which includes the plates in Australian Flycatchers and their Allies, among the first of a new wave of bird identification books. More than any of his contemporaries, he has developed his art in the public eye, chronicled in the many publications containing his work. His rare but successful exhibitions serve to mark stages in his progress and delineate the beginning of new phases in his work. Since 1964, he has illustrated with photographs or paintings, an impressive 30 or more books on birds, and reckons to have painted every Australian bird no less than four times."

== Publications ==
Books authored or coauthored by Slater, or those featuring his illustrations, include:

- 1959 – Wildflowers of Western Australia. (With Eric Lindgren). West Australian Newspapers Ltd: Perth.
- 1964 – Western Australian Birds. BP Refinery: Kwinana.
- 1966 – Wildlife of Western Australia. (With Eric Lindgren). West Australian Newspapers Ltd: Perth. ISBN 0-949864-01-3
- 1968 – Birds of Australia. (With Stanley Breeden). Angus & Robertson: Sydney.
- 1968 – The Hidden Face of Australia. (With Richard Woldendorp). Thomas Nelson: Melbourne.
- 1970 – An Eagle for Pidgin. (Author: Pat Slater). Jacaranda Press. ISBN 0-7016-1684-9
- 1970–1974 – A Field Guide to Australian Birds. (2 vols). Rigby: Adelaide. ISBN 0-85179-102-6
- 1973 – Birds of Australia: A Summary of Information. (Author: J.D. Macdonald). Reed: Sydney. ISBN 0-589-07117-3
- 1974 – Australian Bush Birds. Rigby: Adelaide. ISBN 0-85179-742-3
- 1974 – Australian Flycatchers and their Allies. (Author: Brigadier Hugh R. Officer). Bird Observers Club: Melbourne. ISBN 0-909711-04-6
- 1978 – Rare and Vanishing Australian Birds. Rigby: Adelaide. ISBN 0-7270-0884-6
- 1979 – Masterpieces of Australian Bird Photography. Rigby: Adelaide. ISBN 0-7270-1164-2
- 1979 – The Observer's Book of Birds of Australia. (With Pat Slater). Methuen: Sydney. ISBN 0-7232-1651-7
- 1986 – The Slater Field Guide to Australian Birds. (With Pat and Raoul Slater). Rigby: Sydney. ISBN 0-7270-2085-4
- 1987 – Australian Waterbirds. (With Tom and Pam Gardner, and Raoul Slater). Reed: Sydney. ISBN 0-7301-0190-8
- 1987 – The Illustrated Dictionary of Australian Birds by Common Name. (Author: J.D. Macdonald). Reed: Sydney. ISBN 0-7301-0184-3
- 1988 – The Slaters' Australian Birdwatcher's Notebook. New Holland: Melbourne. ISBN 0-947116-61-3
- 1995 – Photographing Australia's Birds. (With Raoul Slater). Steve Parish Publishing. ISBN 1-875932-15-1
- 1996–2006 – Handbook of Australian, New Zealand and Antarctic Birds. (Vols.3–7). Oxford University Press: Melbourne. ISBN 0-19-553244-9
- 1997 – Australian Birds 1998 Diary. Steve Parish Publishing.
- 1997 – Australian Birds, A Collection of Paintings and Drawings. Steve Parish Publishing. ISBN 1-876282-01-0
- 1997 – Amazing Facts About Australian Marine Life. (With Pat Slater). Steve Parish Publishing.
- 2000 – Cairns and the Tropical North. (With Pat Slater). Steve Parish Publishing. ISBN 1-74021-043-3
- 2004 – Birds and bird lore of Bougainville and the North Solomons. (Author: Don Hadden). Dove Publications: Alderley. ISBN 0-9590257-5-8
- n.d. – Birds of Kings Park, Western Australia. Paterson Brokensha: Perth.
