= The Slater Field Guide to Australian Birds =

Book by Peter Slater

- Cover of first (1986) edition
- Author: Peter Slater, Pat Slater and Raoul Slater
- Illustrator: Peter Slater
- Cover artist: Peter Slater
- Language: English
- Subject: Australian birds
- Genre: Field guide
- Publisher: Rigby: Sydney
- Publication date: 1986
- Publication place: Australia
- Media type: Print (soft cover)
- Pages: 344
- ISBN: 0-7270-2085-4
- Dewey Decimal: 598.2994

The Slater Field Guide to Australian Birds is one of the main national bird field guides used by Australian birders.

== Description ==
The guide was first published in 1986 in Sydney by Rigby Publishers and authored by Peter Slater and other members of his family. It is 215 mm high by 113 mm wide and weighs 440 g. The imprint page asserts copyright of the paintings for Peter Slater, of the text for Pat Slater, and of the maps for Raoul Slater.

== History ==
In 1970-74 Slater had produced a two-volume guide to Australian birds which was the first of the new generation of Australian field guides to appear after the Second World War. It was shortly followed by guides authored by Graham Pizzey in 1980 and by Ken Simpson and Nicolas Day in 1984. Slater's second guide continued the evolutionary succession only two years later. In a review in the ornithological journal Emu Ian Taylor said:

”Peter Slater, in conjunction with his wife Pat and their son Raoul, has produced a one volume field guide for the whole of Australia which looks like being serious competition for Graham Pizzey's popular field guide. The great strengths of this book lie in its size and its format. For the first time, here is a field guide which can actually be used in the field. Unlike earlier multi-volume or large format guides, Slater will fit in a trouser or jacket pocket. Gone are the days of carrying guides in day packs or rushing back to the car to confirm an identification. What is remarkable is that it has taken so long for a pocket sized field guide to appear. Our northern hemisphere counterparts have had them for years. The other great strength is the format. At last we have a field guide with the text and distribution maps opposite the illustrations.”

A second updated and reorganised 360-page edition was issued by New Holland Publishers in 2009. It has 64 new or revised colour plates, incorporating all the new birds recorded in Australia since 1986.
