= A Field Guide to Australian Birds (Slater) =

- Covers of volumes 1 and 2
- Author: Peter Slater
- Illustrator: Peter Slater
- Language: English
- Series: Rigby Field Guides
- Subject: Australian birds
- Genre: Field guide
- Publisher: Rigby: Adelaide
- Publication date: 1970 (vol.1), 1974 (vol.2)
- Publication place: Australia
- Media type: Print (hardcover)
- Pages: xxxii + 428 (vol.1), xvi + 310 (vol.2)
- ISBN: 0-85179-102-6 (vol.1), 0-85179-813-6 (vol.2)
- Dewey Decimal: 598.80994

A Field Guide to Australian Birds is a two-volume bird field guide published by Rigby of Adelaide, South Australia, in its Rigby Field Guide series. The first volume (Volume One: Non-Passerines) was issued in 1970, with the second volume (Volume Two: Passerines) appearing in 1974. It was Australia’s first new national bird field guide since the 1931 publication of the first edition of Neville Cayley’s What Bird is That?. It was principally authored by Australian ornithologist, artist and photographer Peter Slater.

== Description ==
The two volumes are 190 mm high by 130 mm wide. With Volume One, Slater had collaborators who contributed much of the text, while he contributed the text on the Falconiformes and all 64 plates illustrating the bird species. His collaborators were John Calaby, Graeme Chapman, Joseph Forshaw, Harold Frith, Peter Fullagar, Gerry van Tets and Eric Lindgren. Volume Two was essentially all his own work. Individual maps indicate the Australian range of each species.

Volume One was reviewed in the Emu by Arnold McGill (as A.R. McG.):

"Except for Cayley’s What Bird is That? there has been no readily available publication in which all Australian species are illustrated. Mr P. Slater is now filling a great need. The first part of his work is available and the second will, it is understood, soon be completed. A Field Guide to Australian Birds has a much wider scope than Cayley’s book. Apart from the continent and Tasmania it covers the political dependencies Norfolk, Lord Howe, Macquarie, Heard, Christmas and Cocos-Keeling Islands. This is commendable; for, often these outposts of the Commonwealth have been sadly neglected ornithologically and for the first time a fully illustrated guide is available, reasonably priced, covering the whole area except the New Guinea region. It is therefore interesting to see included in an Australian book such species as the Ruddy Crake (Christmas Island), Woodhen (Lord Howe), Weka (Macquarie) and even a new family (Sheathbills), which occurs on Heard Island."

"The illustrations throughout are ample and appear well-executed. Of special significance are the outlines of bills of the Procellariiformes, drawn to actual size, thus providing for a direct check with any specimen examined in the hand or found as a beach derelict. Patterns of flight, especially of seabirds, hawks, terns and waders, are also depicted carefully. Allowing for difficulties in reproducing exact colour, the appearance and shades of species are most pleasing. The size of bill of the Red-necked Stint (p.279) is far too long, but care in such matters is widely apparent. Because there might be some confusion in identifying swallows and swifts, the former family has been added after the Coraciidae. The second part of this publication will be as eagerly awaited as was the first. The whole will be a notable contribution to the ornithology of Australia and a very helpful guide to every field-worker."

McGill also reviewed Volume Two when it was published:

"It is five years since the first volume of this work dealing with the non-passerines became available and most people with ornithological interests in Australia and many overseas possess a copy. Therefore the appearance of this volume on passerines has been eagerly awaited. It completes the work, which many will no doubt compare with Cayley’s long-standing best-seller, What Bird is That? However, because of different style in the illustrations, the gap between them of over forty years and particularly the different order of presentation of species fair comparison is difficult. Slater’s work bears closer affinity with Macdonald’s Birds of Australia (1973), although the latter is more of a handbook than a field guide."

"My copy of this guide to Australian passerines (which has noticeably fewer pages and is more strongly bound than the non-passerine volume) will remain a valued possession and I will often wish to consult it. Instead of endeavouring to weigh its merits against some predecessors, I know that it contains data not available in What Bird is That? and Birds of Australia. It will take its place beside those two books and its non-passerine partner as a worthy addition to my library."

No revised and updated edition of the guide was ever issued. However, in 1986 Slater produced, in collaboration with other members of his family, the completely new, one-volume Slater Field Guide to Australian Birds.
