= Cave (name) =

Cave is both a surname and a given name. Notable people with the name include:

Surname:

- Cave (surname)

Given name:

- Cave Beck (1623–c.1706), English schoolmaster and clergyman, author of an early constructed language
- Cave Johnson (1793–1866), U.S. Congressman from Tennessee and United States Postmaster General
- Cave Underhill (1634 – c. 1710), English actor
- Cave Johnson Couts (1821-1874), American soldier

Fictional characters:

- Cave Carson, character in science fiction stories published by DC Comics
- Cave Johnson (Portal), character in Portal video games
