= Ralfe Whistler =

British naturalist (1930–2023)

Ralfe Ashton Whistler (9 August 1930 – 29 April 2023) was a British naturalist.

== Biography ==
=== Early life and education ===
Ralfe Ashton Whistler was born in Hastings on August 9, 1930. His father, Hugh Whistler FZS, reached the rank of Superintendent in the Imperial Police in India, and was known for his Popular Handbook of Indian Bird. Ralfe's mother was (Margaret) Joan, daughter of Thomas Ashton, 1st Baron Ashton of Hyde. The Ashtons were a prominent Manchester Unitarian family, in the cotton trade; Ashton Brothers became part of Cortaulds. Whistler's parents returned to England from India in part due to social complications arising from Margaret's father's peerage. His upbringing involved exposure to many visiting ornithologists, and to his father's extensive collection of stuffed birds, which were later donated to the British Museum (Natural History).

Whistler attended Eton College and later Selwyn College, Cambridge, where he met Jane McCarthy.

=== Career ===
Whistler enjoyed a highly varied career, including stints as an officer in the 11th Hussars guarding the train to Berlin, and thenthe production line of Volkswagen at Wolfsburg; as a colonial officer in Northern Rhodesia; and at head office of the Hudson's Bay Company in Winnipeg, which led to his eventual purchase of Harbour Island at Mingan, Quebec. He also developed a universal litter-picker wielded in a notable photograph by Margaret Thatcher, and contributed to the "Keep Britain Tidy" campaign.

In the 1960s, served on the fifth Harold Hall Australian expedition to collect birds for the British Museum, six months off road from Perth to Darwin. Later, a purchase of a square mile in North Pownal Vermont led to residency complications, resulting in its lease to novelist Richard Ford. The Yukon, Osoyoos, and Vancouver were sometime homes in his wife's country, Canada.

In the 1970s and 80s, Whistler was involved in the restoration of historic buildings in England, notably Brightling Observatory, built by Mad Jack Fuller, potentially his ancestor. .

Whistler owned several properties, including one in Vermont and another in British Columbia.
