= Home Décor Products =

Former online home improvement retailer

Home Décor Products, Inc.
- Type: Private
- Industry: Online retailers, Home improvement retailers
- Founded: November 2000; 25 years ago
- Defunct: March 26, 2009
- Fate: Bankruptcy
- Headquarters: Edison, New Jersey, U.S.
- Key people: Jon Bernstein, CEO
- Products: Faucets, sinks, home décor, power tools, barbecue grills, swimming pool supplies
- Number of employees: 150+
- Website: www.hdpi.com

Home Décor Products, Inc., was a large online retailer of home improvement and furnishings, headquartered in Edison, New Jersey. It claimed to stock more than 450,000 home products from more than 800 luxury brands including TOTO, Lenox, Kohler, and Jacuzzi.

== Business portfolio ==
Home Décor Products owned and managed the following virtual commerce sites:

- HomeClick.com – home improvement products
- AbsoluteHome.com – home improvement merchandise
- Hechinger.com – power tools and DIY products
- BuildersSquare.com – comparison shopping site for DIY products
- Barbecues.com – barbecue grills and outdoor living merchandise
- ChefsCorner.com – kitchen tools, small kitchen appliances, and tableware
- KnobsandThings.com – cabinet hardware, door handles, and switchplates
- PoolClick.com – pool supplies and accessories

== History ==
Home Décor Products was founded in November 2000 with the acquisition of Bathopia, a bath and kitchen e-tailer. Bathopia was relaunched as HomeClick.com, primarily an online retailer of bath and kitchen products, with the purpose of allowing the average consumer to purchase items directly online that were typically only available in various showrooms scattered about the country. HomeClick grew quickly in its first few years of existence and expanded its product offering to include appliances, lighting, housewares, and tableware by 2002.

In subsequent years, Home Décor Products launched several other websites for different types of products. Specialty sites such as Barbecues.com, KnobsandThings.com and Poolclick.com followed the launch of AbsoluteHome.com in 2004. In 2006, the company purchased NationBlinds.com, a retail business for window furnishings. In October 2005, Home Décor Products bought the brand name of big-box retailer Hechinger, a brand known for do-it-yourself (DIY) products. HDPI also acquired the assets of DIY brand Builders Square, relaunching it as a comparison shopping engine for home and garden products.

HDPI launched an advertising partnership program in June 2007, selling banner adverts on its websites.

In 2006, Home Décor Products was recognized as #5 on the Internet Retailer Top 500 List in the Housewares/Home Furnishings category. HDPI was also ranked on the Inc. 500 List of Fastest Growing Companies of 2006. The company claimed web sales of $83.8 million in 2007. It had excessive inventory costs and was forced to declare Chapter 7 Bankruptcy on March 26, 2009, and has ceased operations.
