= Sculpture (magazine) =

American art magazine

- Cover of the May/June 2024 issue
- Editor: Daniel Kunitz
- Categories: Art magazine
- Frequency: 6 issues per year
- Founder: David Furchgott
- First issue: 1987; 39 years ago
- Company: International Sculpture Center
- Country: United States
- Based in: Pittsburgh, PA
- Website: sculpturemagazine.art
- ISSN: 0889-728X
- OCLC: 14039712

Sculpture is an art magazine, published in Pittsburgh, PA, by the International Sculpture Center. Described as "the essential source of information, criticism, and dialogue on all forms of contemporary sculpture internationally", Sculpture is published in print form and digitally six times per year.

Sculpture is indexed in the Art Index and the Bibliography of the History of Art.

== History and operations ==
The magazine was founded by David Furchgott, first as The International Sculpture Center Bulletin. Sculpture Magazine's first issue was published in 1987.

It is partially supported by a grant from the National Endowment for the Arts.

== See also ==
- List of art magazines
- List of United States magazines
