= Sergio Izquierdo =

Guatemalan nature and conservation photographer, documentarian

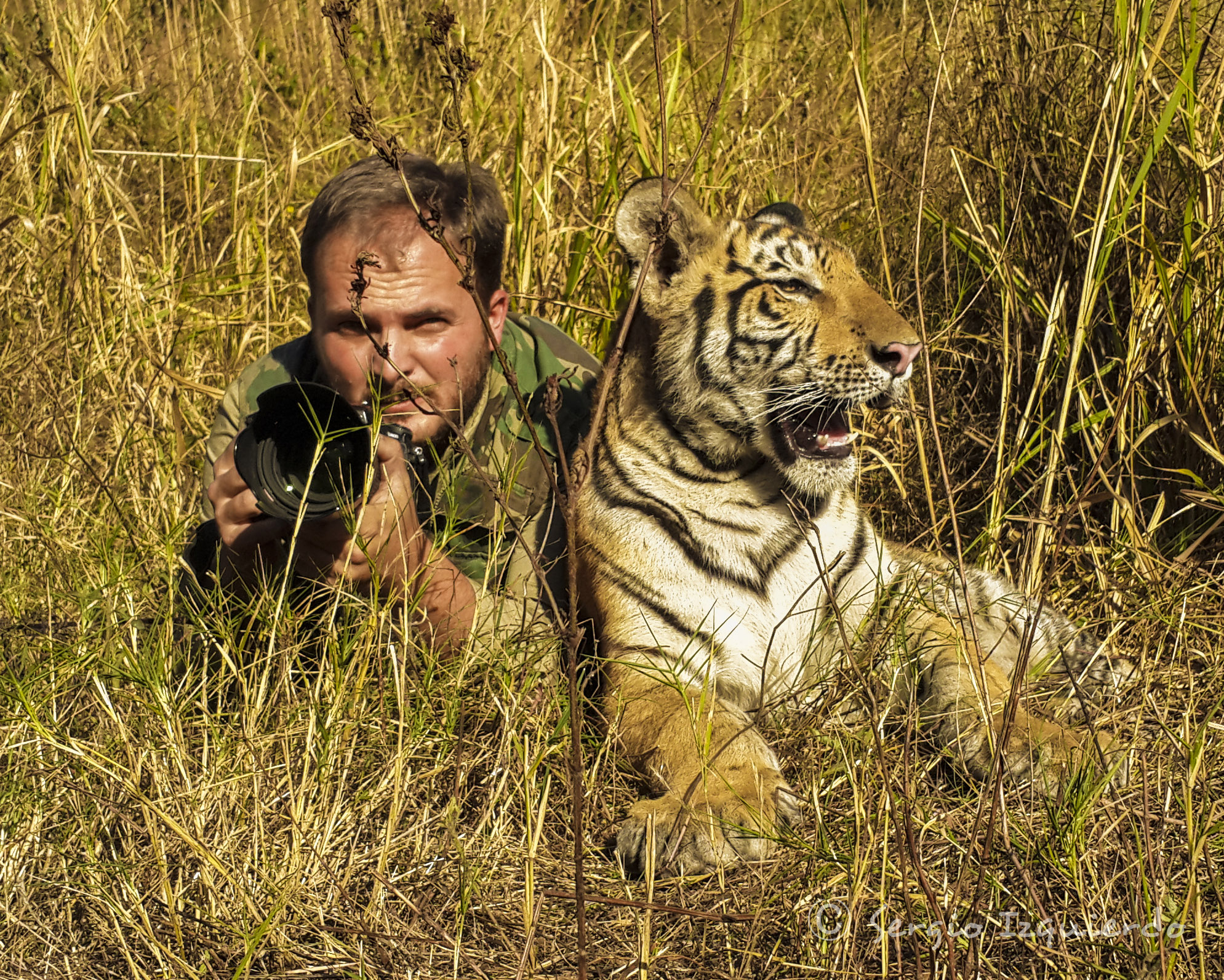
- Known for: Photography, documentary films
- Website: https://www.sergioizquierdo.com/

Sergio Izquierdo is a Guatemalan nature and conservation photographer, documentarian and a member of the International League of Conservation Photographers. His documentary, Plasticsphere, won the Global Champions 2024 award during the World Summit Awards, Best Environmental Documentary Award in Cine Ambiental de Ushuaia Argentina, Research Exploration Winner Award, World Environment Film Festival, and Best Documentary and Best Director, Festival Academia de Cine Antigua en Guatemala. His images for the National Geographic Society won National Geographic in Spanish's Best Edit award seven times, including photographing the work the Chilean Antarctic Institute in 2019. He was awarded with the Mangroves & People, Highly Commended Hope award in 2023 by the Mangrove Photography Awards. His photographs have been featured on the covers of National Geographic Traveler Latin America's October 2017, April 2017 and April 2018 issues.

Izquierdo is also founder of Rescate del Planeta (Rescue the Planet), an organization that raises awareness about plastic pollution, climate change and wildlife conservation; the organization won the World Champion Award at the World Summit Awards in 2024.

His photographs have appeared in 50 stories in National Geographic, including images of South Africa's Kruger National Park, and the total solar eclipse of July 2, 2019, He is also author of Guatemala Salvaje, published by the group.

In addition to his work with National Geographic, Izquierdo has been part of teams to document the Ozama and Isabela Rivers in the Dominican Republic and the population living around the rivers. His images were also part of a BBC report regarding threats to Guatemala's Maya Biosphere Reserve in October 2019, and he was a camera operator for the BBC's Jungle Animal Hospital. He is also author of Cómo Lograr el Sueño de todo Fotógrafo, or How to Achieve Every Photographer's Dream.

Izquierdo was also one of 12 photographers selected from 7,000 from Latin America and Spain featured at the International Arts & Artists at the IA&A at Hillyer in 2010's imMigration [sic] exhibition.
