= Allan Reginald McEvey =

Australian ornithologist and teacher (1919–1996)

Allan Reginald McEvey (1919–1996) was an Australian ornithologist. He was a schoolteacher before becoming Curator of Ornithology at the National Museum of Victoria in Melbourne, Australia. In 1962–63, he participated in the first of the Harold Hall Australian ornithological collecting expeditions. He was President of the Royal Australasian Ornithologists Union (RAOU) in 1968–1969, a critical period in its history. He was elected a Fellow of the RAOU in 1980.
