= Queensland Ornithological Society Inc =

The Queensland Ornithological Society Inc (QOSI), also known as Birds Queensland, was founded on 15 October 1969 when the Queensland branch of the Royal Australasian Ornithologists Union (RAOU) became defunct following drastic reform within the RAOU in the late 1960s. The founding President was J.D. Macdonald. It publishes a quarterly journal, Sunbird, as well as a monthly newsletter, Queensland Bird Notes. Its aims are “to promote the scientific study and conservation of birds by all means possible, with particular reference to the birds of Queensland”. For its members it holds monthly meetings in Brisbane as well as regular field excursions and campouts. The logo of Birds Queensland is the yellow-bellied sunbird, a species whose Australian range lies entirely within Queensland.
