= Specialty store =

Store focusing on a large assortment in a narrow category

A specialty store is a shop or store that carries a deep assortment of brands, styles, or models within a relatively narrow category of goods. Furniture stores, florists, sporting goods stores, and bookstores are all specialty stores. Stores such as The Athlete's Foot (sports shoes only) are considered superspecialty stores. A category killer is a specialty store with a high volume of sales and extensive product selection within its category.

Specialty stores compete with other types of retailers such as supermarkets, showrooms, jewelry shop, department, wine shop, milk bar, big box, general, shop in shop, hardware and variety stores.
