= Birds of Australia: A Summary of Information =

Book by James David Macdonald

- Author: J. D. Macdonald
- Illustrator: Peter Slater
- Language: English
- Subject: Australian birds
- Genre: Ornithological handbook
- Publisher: A.H. & A.W. Reed: Sydney
- Publication date: 1973
- Publication place: Australia
- Media type: Print (hardback) with dust jacket
- Pages: 552
- ISBN: 0-589-07117-3

Birds of Australia: A Summary of Information is a compact handbook on Australian birds published in 1973. It was authored by the originally British ornithologist James David Macdonald who moved permanently to Australia in 1968 following his retirement from a long career with the British Natural History Museum, one of the final responsibilities of which was the organisation of the Harold Hall Australian bird collecting expeditions during the 1960s. The book is dedicated to the sponsor of the expeditions, Australian-born philanthropist Harold Wesley Hall, OBE, MC.

== Description ==
The book is 255 mm in height by 190 mm in width. It has 552 pages and contains 24 colour plates by Peter Slater as well as numerous drawings in the text by the same artist. Following the author's introduction and explanatory notes on the text there is a chapter on the “Origin and Structure of Australian Bird Fauna” by D.L. Serventy, with 51 pages of distribution maps at the end between the species accounts and the index.

== Review ==
The book was reviewed in the Emu, the ornithological journal of the Royal Australasian Ornithologists Union, shortly before the opening of the August 1974 International Ornithological Congress in Canberra. Some extracts from the review:

”This book, subtitled ‘A Summary of Information’, is intended by the author first for identification. As well as giving descriptions, it briefly outlines variation, distribution, habitat, habits, breeding, voice, food, status and taxonomy of all birds recorded in Australia. In addition Dr D.L. Serventy contributes a lucid eight-page essay on zoogeography, which not only summarizes a lot of recent information, but also embraces challenging new views on the origins of the early Australian avifauna.”

”Of the 745 species, 467 are illustrated. Two hundred and forty-eight of these are in colour and the rest in black and white, often of part of the bird only. For many ornithologists the lack of illustrations of many species is likely to be a real drawback, in spite of 117 keys in the text for the identification of species within families or genera. The field characters used in the keys thus become very important.”

”Peter Slater’s black and white illustrations are accurate, lifelike and delightful. His colour plates are also successful though the colours of some species are slightly too pale (e.g. Pink Robin), but this is not serious.”

”This book has a lot of useful information, the production of which has clearly involved painstaking, and no doubt lengthy, labour by the author. However, it can be seen from what has been said that there are inaccuracies and gaps. Even if some of these details appear minor, it must be remembered that expensive reference books stand or fall on detail. The author appeals, in the introduction, for readers to point out faults and provide new information. The second edition could thus be much improved.”

”But now we do have one modern, systematically arranged book of all Australian birds available when we welcome the world’s ornithologists here in August.”
