= Francis Oswin Cave =

English ornithologist

Colonel the Right Reverend Monsignor Francis Oswin Cave MC (27 August 1897 – 21 November 1974), known to his friends as "Katie", was an English army officer, Catholic priest and ornithologist. He was interested in the birds of Africa, and took part in the Hall Macdonald expedition into South West Africa of 1949. A bird subspecies and four subspecies were named after him.

== Early life ==
He was born in Hampshire, the second son of Charles John Philip Cave, a meteorologist and antiquarian, and his wife Wilhelmina Mary Henrietta Kerr, daughter of Major Francis Kerr. The family was Catholic: his father was educated at The Oratory School, and Francis Kerr was a convert in 1852.

Cave was educated at The Oratory School. He was then a Gentleman Cadet at the Royal Military College, Sandhurst.

== Military career ==
In World War I, Cave on 15 October 1915 joined from the Royal Military College the Rifle Brigade, as a second lieutenant. He gained an aviator's certificate from the Royal Aero Club on 13 May 1916. He joined the Royal Flying Corps where he became a captain. He flew with No. 4 Squadron RFC from July 1916 to March 1917, and was awarded the Military Cross in June 1917, when he was an acting lieutenant. He was with the No. 52 Reserve Squadron RFC in the United Kingdom from March 1917 to March 1918; and then, after the end of the war, with No. 94 Squadron RAF operating in the UK and also France, from November 1918 to February 1919. He served further in France with No. 32 Squadron RAF, from February to October 1919.

Cave returned to the Rifle Brigade, serving in Ireland in 1921, from January to April.

During World War II, Cave was awarded a military OBE in 1942, as a major (local lieutenant-colonel) attached to the Sudan Defence Force (SDF); he had commanded the Equatorial Corps of the SDF in the East African campaign. He served in Burma with the Chindits, as second-in-command of the 16th Infantry Brigade under Bernard Fergusson.

Fergusson, the younger man, had regarded Cave as a personal friend for ten years, and his elder brother Major Simon Fergusson had served with the Sudan Defence Corps (Equatorial Corps) from 1937, under Cave's command, in rain forest. Cave, keen to be engaged in the Burma campaign, negotiated a transfer involving a drop in rank. Faced with moving forces of the 16th Infantry Brigade to the Chindwin River, Fergusson asked Cave to help with liaison and the Ledo Road network of routes used by Joseph Stilwell, for access to the Hukawng Valley. He and Cave met at Haydon Boatner's headquarters on 22 January 1944, when Cave's patrols had negative reports about the difficulties of the Hukawng Valley.

Cave flew to the front with instructions for 16th Brigade, via Chabua Air Force Station, with James Davidson-Houston of the Royal Engineers and Mission 204, who was in charge of commando units in Burma. In March 1944 the 16th Brigade's attack on Japanese-held Indaw failed. Fergusson was compelled to withdraw.

Cave returned to East Africa and a post of Chief of Police in Sudan. He retired in 1949, becoming the honorary colonel commandant of the Equatorial Corps.

== Later life ==
While serving as police chief in Sudan, and living in Juba, Cave had at times celebrated Christmas at the chapel of the Comboni Fathers. On retirement, unmarried, he joined their mission. He studied at Beda College in Rome, and was ordained as a Catholic priest in 1954.

Cave left Sudan in 1955, being persona non grata to the incoming administration of the Republic of Sudan. A diary kept by Cave of the period of the Torit mutiny in 1955 is in the Robert Oakley Collins Papers at the University of Durham.

Made a Prelate of Honour of His Holiness in 1961 by Pope John XXIII, Cave had Monsignor as ecclesiastical style.

== Ornithology ==
=== 1926 with Mason ===
Cave was mentored by Hugh Whistler, who supported a study and collection of birds of the Karakoram region. He went with Kenneth Mason in 1926, in a party with the officers Reginald Charles Clifford of the Indian Medical service (replacing Richard Hingston) and Henry Darrell Minchinton. The expedition was funded by the Survey of India. Whistler wrote that Cave, commissioned to write a report on the bird life encountered, had at this point no ornithological background.

The party explored the valley of the Shaksgam River and the Aghil Pass area. Of the bird skins collected, Whistler commented that the dusky warbler was outside its expected range. As to further expeditions in the area, the Shaksgam Valley was later visited by Eric Shipton in 1947. He wrote that Mason's object was "to cross from the Karakorum pass ... to the headwaters of the Shaksgam. [...] His way was barred by a great glacier, which, coming down from the northern slopes of the Teram Kangri range, dammed the Shaksgam river. Taking into account Mason's problems, his own approach was "to cross the Karakoram range from the Baltoro glacier."

=== NHM expedition ===
During the African expedition of the Natural History Museum, Cave supported the team with his Land Rover (named "Katie") which he later donated to the Harold Hall expedition into Australia.

=== Bird systematic names ===
Of the birds named cavei for Cave, taxonomic progress to 2014 left two subspecies in good standing: the dune lark Calendulauda erythrochlamys cavei, and Bradypterus cinnamomeus cavei. The latter is a subspecies of the cinnamon bracken warbler, and was collected at Kipia and Kinyeti, high in the Imatong Mountains, by Cave and by Macdonald. The species named Scoptelus cavei (Macdonald 1946) is now taken to be the black scimitarbill.

== Works ==
- Birds of the Sudan: Their Identification and Distribution (1955), with J. D. Macdonald
