= Birds of Australia (disambiguation) =

Birds of Australia is the country's avian fauna.

Birds of Australia may also refer to:

- The Birds of Australia (Broinowski) by Gracius J. Broinowski, published 1890/1891
- The Birds of Australia (Gould) by John Gould, published 1840–1848
- The Birds of Australia (Mathews) by Gregory M. Mathews, published 1910–1927
- Birds of Australia: A Summary of Information by J. D. Macdonald, published 1973
- The Ornithology of Australia (1865–1870) by Silvester Diggles
- The Australian Bird Guide, a 2017 book
