= Leonard Cave =

American sculptor (1944–2006)

Leonard E. Cave
- Leonard Cave stands next to one of his sculptures.
- Born: October 22, 1944; Columbia, South Carolina
- Died: June 11, 2006 (aged 61); Frederick County, Maryland
- Education: Furman University; University of Maryland
- Known for: Sculpture
- Movement: Washington Sculptors Group
- Awards: Piedmont Craftsman Annual Exhibition – Best in Wood; 1997

Leonard E. Cave (October 22, 1944 – June 11, 2006) was an American sculptor who worked in the Washington metropolitan area. Cave exhibited his works in solo and group exhibitions mainly within the United States and Japan. He primarily worked with wood, carving large sculptural and abstract pieces, though he also worked with other materials, such as metal. In 1984, Cave founded the Washington Sculptors Group in Washington, D.C. He presided over this group for several years, though he was also a professor at Georgetown University and a public school teacher. He died in 2006 after sustaining fatal injuries from a car accident involving a drunk driver.

== Biography ==
=== Early life ===
Leonard Cave was born on October 22, 1944, to Cecil Reginald and Lila Mae Cave, the third of four brothers, Cecil, Blanchard, and the youngest, Phillip. He was born in Columbia, South Carolina, but spent his childhood in Orangeburg. When Cave was young, his father died. Throughout his childhood, he had undiagnosed Tourette's syndrome.

=== Education ===
After high school, Cave enrolled in Furman University on a pole-vaulting scholarship. During one competition, Cave sustained a back injury. While he was recovering, he devoted his time to sculpture. Eventually Cave transferred schools, going on to develop his skills as a sculptor and earn a master's degree in Fine Art from the University of Maryland. It was there that he studied under the sculptor Ken Campbell, by whom he was greatly influenced.

After completing his graduate coursework, Cave taught at Georgetown University for seven years. In 1986 he left his position at Georgetown University to teach briefly at the Torpedo Factory. For twenty years he taught at public schools in Montgomery County where he taught ceramics, sculpture and digital art. Additionally, he was instrumental in establishing an Academy of Commercial and Fine Art for the Montgomery County School District. At the time of his death, Cave was working for Northwest High School in Germantown, MD.

=== Washington Sculptors Group ===
In 1984, Cave was a founding member of the Washington Sculptors Group (WSG). Cave was elected the WSG's President and oversaw the formation of the organization. He helped draft its first constitution and by-laws, insured its non-profit status, organized the first Board, and located sites for shows. In addition, he worked with the National Park Service to host the first symposium on wood sculpture that took place in accordance with WSG. His mission was to push sculpture into the foreground of DC art (which was otherwise considered a "painter's town") and to foster an exchange of ideas among sculptors, collectors, and the public.

=== Death ===
Cave died on July 11, 2006, in a head-on collision with a drunk driver. The collision occurred in Frederick County, MD. The surviving passenger in the car was Carolyn Gipe, a fellow teacher and his fiancée.

Three years after his death, Northwest High School dedicated the new art wing to him. The Leonard E. Cave Memorial Arts Wing holds a sculpture by the artist as well as a mural depicting his likeness.

=== Personal life ===
Cave was formerly married to Sandi Cave, but at the time of his death he was engaged to be married to a co-worker. He was a member of Cedarbrook Community Church in Clarksburg, Maryland.

"Untitled"

== Artwork ==
According to Cave's elder brother, much of Cave's work went to Furnam University upon his death. A large collection of his work was given to Hillyer Art Space in Washington, D.C., whose parent organization is International Arts & Artists. Duncan Tebow, former president of WSG and board member of IA&A, was a close personal friend of Cave's. Several of Cave's works that have been hosted on Hillyer Art Space's big cartel have been put up for auction and successfully sold.

"Untitled"

=== Solo exhibitions ===
Year	Exhibition
2004	New Art Center, New York, NY
2002	Washington County Museum of Art, Hagerstown, MD Amy Thomas Gallery, Boca Raton, FL
1989, 1991, 1993	Brody's Gallery, Washington, DC
1991	Center Galleries, Detroit MI
1991	Metropolitan Design Center, New York, NY Eastern Shore Art Center, Fairhope, AL
1982–1991	Gallery 2000, Columbus, OH
1978, 1981	Hom Gallery, Washington, DC I. Pinckney Simons Gallery, Beaufort, SC
1984, 1986, 1987	Marsha Mateyka Gallery, Washington, DC

=== Group exhibitions ===
Year	Exhibition
1991–Present	I. Pinckney Simons Gallery, LLC, Beaufort, SC
2012	The Stanback Museum and Planetarium, Orangeburg, SC
2002–2003	Artsforum Galler, Group Show, New York, N.Y.
2002, 2003, 2004	Manifestations: Form and Function – Denise Bibro Fine Art, New York, NY
2001	A Shriek from an Invisible Box – Mefuro Museum, Tokyo, Japan
2001–2002	Out of Tradition: Selections from the Washington Sculptors Group, Delaware Center for the Contemporary Arts
2001	Sculpture Takes Over Rockland Center for the Arts – A Group Exhibition from the Sculptors Guild, West Nyack., New York
2001	International Juried Show, New Jersey Center for Visual Arts
2001	Sculptures from Chesterwood, The Arts Center of the Capital Region, Troy, NY
1999, 2000	Grounds for Sculpture, Hamilton, NJ
2000–2001	The Arts and Humnanitites Council of Montgomery County and Brookside Gardens, Wheaton, MD
2000	12th Annual International Works on Paper, Park Avenue Armory, New York, NY
2000–2004	Burton Marinkovisch Fine Art, Washington, DC
1999–2004	Swanson Cralle, Louisville, KY
1998, 2000	Contemporary Sculpture at Chesterwood, Stockbridge, MA
1999–2000	Annmarie Garden, Prince Frederick, MD
1999	Aster Place, Hiroshima, Japan
1998	Binnale Ceremony at Fujia HR Center in Kansai Science City, Japan
1979–2004	Malton Gallery, Cincinnati, OH

=== Craft-related exhibitions ===
Year	Exhibition
1997	Pledmont Craftsman Annual Exhibition, Winston-Salem, NC
1994	Designer Crafts on 5th Avenue, New York, NY
1994	Wadsworth Atheneum, Hartford, Connectivut, Craft show
1994, 1995	Columbia Museum of Art, Columbia, SC, Southeastern Art and Craft Exposition
1993	American Craft Council Exhibition, Baltimore, MD
1993	American Craft Council Exhibition, West Springfield, MA
1993	Holidays at the White House, Washington, DC
1992	Excellence in Wood Award Des Moines Art Center Craft Expo, Des Moines, Iowa

=== Collections ===
- Allegheny College, Meadeville, PA
- Bank of Dallas, Dallas, TX
- City of West Hollywood, CA
- Columbia Museum of Art, Columbia, SC
- Department of State, Washington, DC
- Furman University, Greenville, SC
- Herbert F. Johnson Museum of Art, Cornell University, Ithaca, NY
- IP Stanback Museum and Planetarium, Orangeburg, SC
- Mintz, Levin, Washington, DC
- Oliver Carr Company, Washington, DC
- Silas Mountsier, Nutley, New Jersey
- South Carolina State Museum
- South Carolina State University
- The White House, Washington, DC
- University of Maryland, College Park, MD

== Awards ==
Year	Placement	Event
1997	Best in Wood	Pledmont Craftsman Annual Exhibition, Winston-Salem, NC
1995	Finalist	Mid-Atlantic Arts Foundation Regional Fellowships
1992	Excellence in Wood	Des Moines Art Center Craft Expo, Des Moines, Iowa
