= Alexander Cave =

British anatomist (1900–2001)

Alexander James Edward Cave FRCS FLS (13 September 1900 – 17 May 2001) was a British anatomist.

== Early life and education ==
Cave was born in Manchester and was educated at Manchester High School. He then read medicine at the University of Manchester, graduating in 1923.

== Academic career ==
Cave was Senior Demonstrator and Lecturer in Anatomy at the University of Leeds until 1933, when he became the Curator of the Anatomical Museum at University College in London. He also became Arnott Demonstrator and Professor of Human and Comparative Anatomy at the Royal College of Surgeons. For more than two decades, he was Professor of Anatomy at St Bartholomew's Hospital. He was also Examiner in Anatomy for London University, Cambridge University, and the Royal University of Malta.

Cave was elected a Fellow of the Royal College of Surgeons (FRCS) in 1959. He was also granted lifetime membership of the Anatomical Society.

He served as president of the Linnean Society from 1970 to 1973. He was a staunch Roman Catholic and got involved in several attempts to authenticate church relics.

He and William L. Straus are known for having published jointly during 1957 the remark concerning Neanderthal people that:

"If he could be reincarnated and placed in a New York subway— provided that he were bathed, shaved, and dressed in modern clothing— it is doubtful whether he would attract any more attention than some of its other denizens."

== Marriages and children ==
Cave married twice. Firstly in 1926 to Dorothy Dimbleby, with whom he had one daughter, and secondly in 1970 to Catherine FitzGerald.

== Death ==
Cave died in London in 2001 at the age of 100.
