= Matt Cave =

Australian rules footballer, born 1910

Personal information
- Full name: Matthew Charles Cave
- Born: 30 March 1910; Footscray, Victoria
- Died: 14 January 1975 (aged 64); Yarraville, Victoria
- Original team: Yarraville
- Height: 190 cm (6 ft 3 in)
- Weight: 86 kg (190 lb)

Playing career^{1}
Years	Club	Games (Goals)
1932–33	Footscray	10 (1)
1933–34	St Kilda	14 (3)
Total		24 (4)
- ^{1} Playing statistics correct to the end of 1934.

Matthew Charles Cave (30 March 1910 – 14 January 1975) was a former Australian rules footballer who played with Footscray and St Kilda in the Victorian Football League (VFL).

Cave returned to Yarraville from St Kilda in April 1935 and played 64 games with the Eagles up until the end of 1938. He then transferred to neighbouring Williamstown in April 1939 and played a starring role in 'Town's record-breaking premiership victory that season. They were the first Association or League team to rise from last in one season to be premiers the next. Cave played 42 games and kicked 18 goals with Williamstown up until the end of 1941 when the VFA went into recess due to the Second World War. Work commitments with Mobil and injuries curtailed his final season but he still managed a few appearances in the seconds towards the end of the year. Cave died suddenly at his home in Yarraville in January 1975.
