= Vincent Cave =

Vincent Cave was Archdeacon of Elphin from 1669 until 1670.
