= Bob Cave =

Australian rules footballer

Personal information
- Full name: Robert Newman Cave
- Born: 13 August 1888; Fitzroy North, Victoria
- Died: 30 September 1943 (aged 55); Kew, Victoria
- Original team: Sturt
- Height: 165 cm (5 ft 5 in)
- Weight: 64 kg (141 lb)

Playing career^{1}
Years	Club	Games (Goals)
1912	St Kilda	5 (1)
- ^{1} Playing statistics correct to the end of 1912.

Robert Newman Cave (13 August 1888 – 30 September 1943) was an Australian rules footballer who played with St Kilda in the Victorian Football League (VFL).
