= Kyle Cave =

Kyle R. Cave is a professor of psychology at UMass Amherst. His primary research interest is visual selective attention, and he teaches courses in cognitive psychology and consciousness.

His most important contribution is the FeatureGate model of attentional selection.
