= Vernal G. Cave =

American physician (1918–1997)

Vernal Gordon Cave (1918–1997) was an American doctor, local official, educator and activist in Brooklyn, New York.

== Early life ==
Cave was the oldest of five children, born to Barbadians Joseph and Selina Small Cave in Colon, Panama in 1918. The family moved to Brooklyn in 1921.

== Education and military service ==
He graduated from City College of New York in 1941 and earned his M.D. at Howard University in 1944. He served as a U.S. Air Force doctor from 1947 to 1952, during which time he was the medical officer for the famous Tuskegee Airmen of World War II.

== Professional life ==
After his discharge from the military, he practiced medicine in Brooklyn for over forty years. He was Brooklyn's first Board Certified Dermatologist of African-American descent and the first to become a Diplomat of the American Board of Dermatology and Syphilogy. He was also the first Black President of the Medical Society of the County of Kings and the first to serve as President of the First District Branch of the New York State Medical Society. He also served on the board of the Brookdale University Hospital and Medical Center.

He was the 73rd President of the National Medical Association, an organization for Black medical professionals, which also named the Vernal Cave Medical Humanitarian award in his honor. According to one honoree of the award, he “understood that the practice of medicine and the care of patients extend beyond the office, into the community if one is to fully and faithfully live up to our oath to heal.”

== Public service and recognition ==
In 1973, Dr. Cave served on a congressional advisory panel that investigated and ultimately denounced the infamous Tuskegee syphilis study, though it was later claimed that he may have been aware of the study as it was occurring.

In 1974, Dr. Cave was appointed to Governor Hugh Carey’s health task force. As part of the task force, Cave and Mary Lasker prepared a preventative medicine report. Dr. Cave also served as both a founding director and member of the board of New York City's Health and Hospital Corporation, as well as director of the New York City Health Department’s Bureau of Venereal Disease Control. During his service, Dr. Cave was part of recruiting the corporation's first black president, Dr. John L.S. Holloman Jr.

Additionally, Cave was a community activist, author, lecturer, and officer of a number of local organizations as well as a mentor to many students. He chaired the National Medical Association's Board of Trustees, the Black Community Council of Crown Heights and the New York State Commission on Minority Enrollment in Medical Schools. He was also involved with the Arthur Ashe Institute for Urban Health, New York Urban League, Howard University Medical Alumni Association, Crown Heights Lions Club, Comus Club, Provident Clinical Society and Alpha Sigma Boule of the Sigma Pi Phi fraternity.

He was a founding director of the Bedford-Stuyvesant Restoration Corporation, many of the planning meetings for which took place at his residence on President Street in Crown Heights. Other planners such as John M. Doar and Senator Robert Kennedy attended some of these meetings. Dr. Cave was instrumental in establishing the Bedford Stuyvesant Family Health Center, for which he was chairman for over twenty years, from 1976 until his death.

As part of his various roles in the community, Cave also participated in local politics, such as by supporting Representative Major Owens. He was also closely associated with State Supreme Court Justice Thomas R. Jones, former Deputy Police Commissioner and the BSRC's first president Franklin A. Thomas, and New York City political figures like Percy Sutton and Mayor David N. Dinkins. Cave was a prominent neighborhood voice during the racial tensions in Crown Heights around the 1991 Crown Heights riots.

His honors and awards included the Distinguished Service Award from Howard University, recognition by the Alpha Omega Alpha Honor Society, an Honorary Doctorate from Medgar Evers College, and Man of the Year at Janes United Methodist Church.

== Death ==
Cave died from cardiac arrest in May 1997. He was survived by his wife, Natalie Helene Jacobs Cave. His memorial services were conducted at Concord Baptist Church of Christ and he was buried at the Cemetery of the Evergreens.
