= Nicolaes Cave =

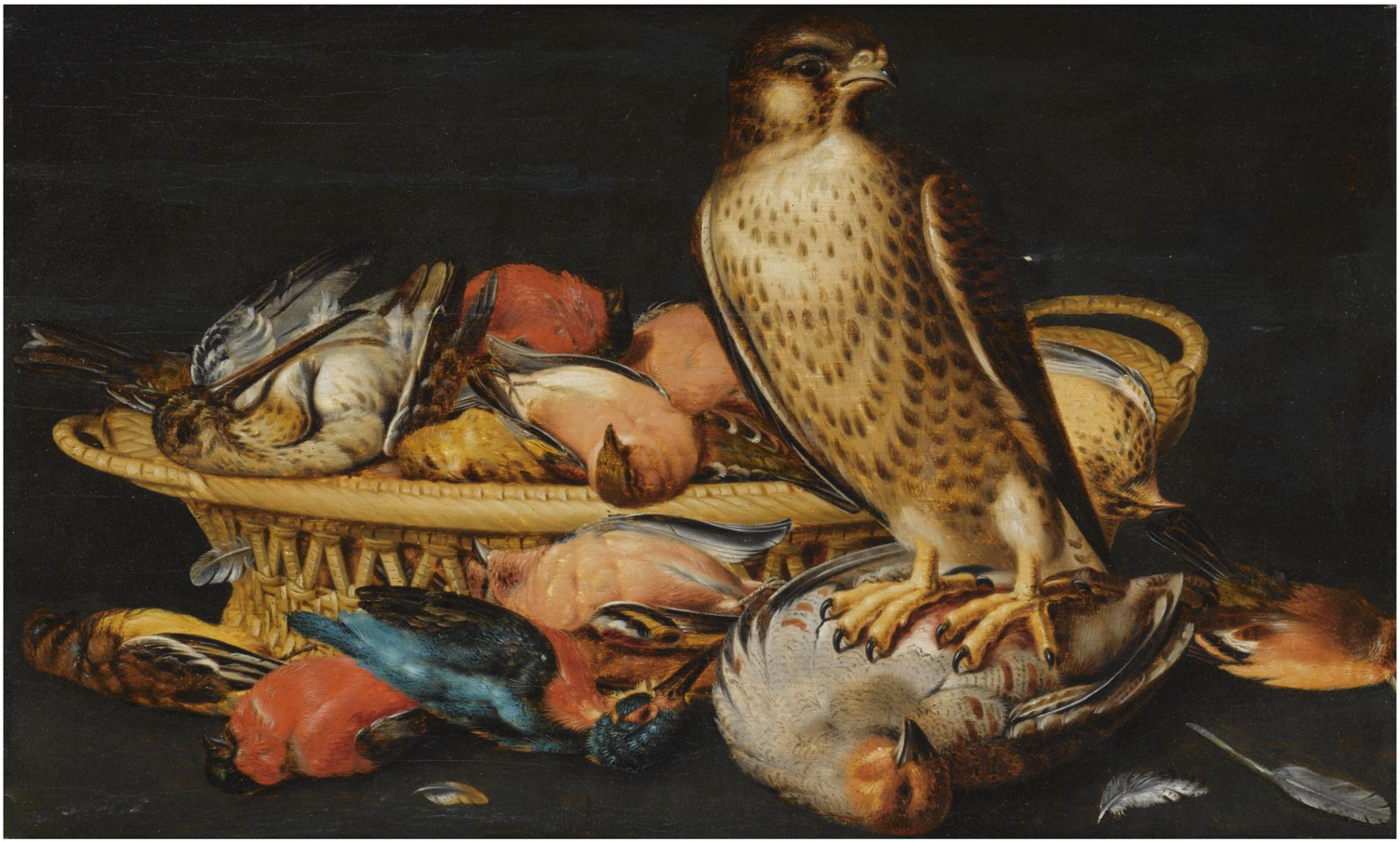
A falcon and dead game on a table

Nicolaes Cave (fl 1619 – 1651) was a Flemish Baroque still life painter, whose few known works are still lifes featuring game.

== Life ==
Very little is known about this artist. He is first mentioned when he registers as a member of the Antwerp Guild of Saint Luke in 1619. He was active in Antwerp until 1651, the year in which his death dues were paid to the Guild.

== Work ==
The work of this obscure still life painter is fairly unknown. He painted several versions of a still life with a live hawk (or falcon) perched on a dead partridge together with other dead game in a woven basket. A signed version was recorded with Schlichte Bergen in 1993 and another was auctioned at Sotheby's in 2008 (Sotheby's 11 November 2008, London, lot 138). Although his work shows indebtedness to that of Clara Peeters, the stylistic elements in Cave's work show a clear individuality.
