= Charles John Philip Cave =

English meteorologist, historian and photographer

Captain Charles John Philip Cave FRAS, FSA (born Ditcham Park Hampshire, 1 May 1871 – died near Petersfield, Hampshire, 8 December 1950) was an English meteorologist, a church architectural historian and photographer, and a captain in the Royal Engineers.

== Early life and education ==
Cave's father was Lawrence Trent Cave of Ditcham Park, Ditcham, Petersfield, Hampshire, and his mother was Lucy (née Greenwood) of Broadhanger, Petersfield, Hampshire. He was educated at The Oratory School in Edgbaston, Birmingham, matriculating in 1889. He then studied at Trinity College, Cambridge, receiving a BA in 1893 and an MA in 1896.

== Professional work and other interests ==
Cave served as a Justice of the Peace for Hampshire in 1906. He was President of the Royal Meteorological Society in the years 1913 and 1914 and again in 1924 and 1925. During the First World War he was a captain in the Meteorological Section of the Royal Engineers, serving in England and France as an instructor, experimenter and forecaster. In 1915 his installation at Aldershot of a lightning recorder enabled aircraft pilots to be warned of approaching thunderstorms, putting Britain ahead of other nations in this respect. He was a Member of the International Commission for Investigation of the Upper Air from the early 20th century onwards.

He was a keen yachtsman and navigator, through which he developed an interest in astronomy. On 11 January 1918 he was elected a Fellow of the Royal Astronomical Society.

Cave was also a skilled camera technician, and through his meteorological interests took many photographs of clouds. Later in his career, his study of telephotography led to an interest in antiquarian subjects: he took more than 8,000 photographs of roof carvings in medieval English churches and cathedrals, on which he was regarded as a leading authority. One of his later projects was to measure the orientation of 642 churches, finding that only 103 of them were on at least an approximate east-west line. He published papers in Archaeologia and the Antiquaries Journal, among others. His documentary archive, together with a large collection of photographs and camera equipment, are held at the Society of Antiquaries of London. Negatives and lantern slides of his architectural photographs are held by the National Monuments Record and the Conway Library archive, Courtauld Institute of Art, University of London. The Conway archive is currently being digitised as part of the Courtauld Connects project.

== Family ==
Cave married Wilhelmina Mary Henrietta Kerr on 23 October 1895; they had one daughter and four sons, including Laurence Charles Henry Cave (born 19 August 1896), and army officer and priest Francis Oswin Cave (1897-1974.

== Selected works ==
- The structure of the atmosphere in clear weather; a study of soundings with pilot balloons. Cambridge University Press. 1912.
- Soundings with pilot balloons in the isles of Scilly, November and December 1911, by Captain C. J. P. Cave, M. A., and J. S. Dines, M. A. Pub. by the authority of the Meteorological committee. 1920.
- Clouds and weather phenomena. University of Cambridge. 1926.; 2nd edition. 1943.
- Roof bosses of the Cathedral church of Christ, Canterbury. 1934.
- Roof bosses of Winchester Cathedral. 1935.
- Roof bosses in medieval churches; an aspect of Gothic sculpture. Illus. with telephotos. 1948.
- Medieval carvings in Exeter Cathedral. With A note on the art of the Exeter carvers, by Nikolaus Pevsner. 1953.
