= International Sculpture Center =

The International Sculpture Center (ISC) is a 501(c)3 nonprofit organization founded in 1960 by Elden Tefft and James A. Sterritt at the University of Kansas. It is currently located at 5126 Butler St., in Pittsburgh PA. It publishes Sculpture magazine.
