= Derek Goodwin =

British ornithologist

Richard Patrick Goodwin (26 February 1920 – 14 May 2008), known as Derek Goodwin, was a British ornithologist who wrote a series of what The Times called "definitive works" on estrildid finches, crows and pigeons. He was considered to be an expert on bird behaviour.

Goodwin was born Richard Patrick Goodwin in Woking, United Kingdom, on 26 February 1920. His parents called him Derek for reasons he never fully understood, but the name stayed with him for his entire life. He served in the British military in the Royal Artillery during World War II and was a veteran of the Siege of Tobruk. He left the military in August 1945 and embarked on his career in ornithology.

Goodwin was a writer and contributor to Avicultural Magazine. By chance, in July 1945, while Goodwin was still in active duty in the military, his purchase of back issues of Avicultural Magazine led to a series of unexpected events which led to his employment at the Natural History Museum. Though he had no formal education in ornithology at the time, Goodwin was hired to work in the Natural History Museum's bird room. He eventually rose up through the ranks to become principal scientific officer for birds at the museum. In 1965 he participated in the third of the Harold Hall Australian ornithological collecting expeditions. He wrote a series of detailed books on crows, pigeons and estrildid finches during the 1970s and 1980s as part of his work at the British Museum. These works are still regarded as the definitive works on these particular birds today. He also authored and published his favorite work, Birds in Man’s World, and wrote a series of children's books and pamphlets on birds.

He was known as a prolific bird correspondents and was elected as a corresponding member of Deutsche Ornithologen-Gesellschaft in the 1970s, though he never studied German in school. He also taught and mentored noted ornithologists, such as Aubrey Manning, Rob Hume and Desmond Morris when they were students.

Goodwin was also a longtime advocate for the plight of two rare pheasant species; the golden pheasant and the Lady Amherst's pheasant. He wrote numerous letters and articles on the subject of these two birds. He even resigned from the Royal Society for the Protection of Birds to protest its perceived lack of support for saving these pheasants, which had been introduced to parts of rural England. Unlike most ornithologists and bird watchers, Goodwin supported the plight of introduced bird species in Britain and elsewhere. However, he did not support the reintroduction of raptor species, even regarding the white-tailed eagle as a potential danger to other species.

Derek Goodwin died on 14 May 2008, at the age of 88.

== Selected works ==
- Crows of the World (1976)
- Pigeons and Doves of the World (1977)
- Estrildid Finches of the World (1984)
- Birds in Man’s World
