= Bertha Cave =

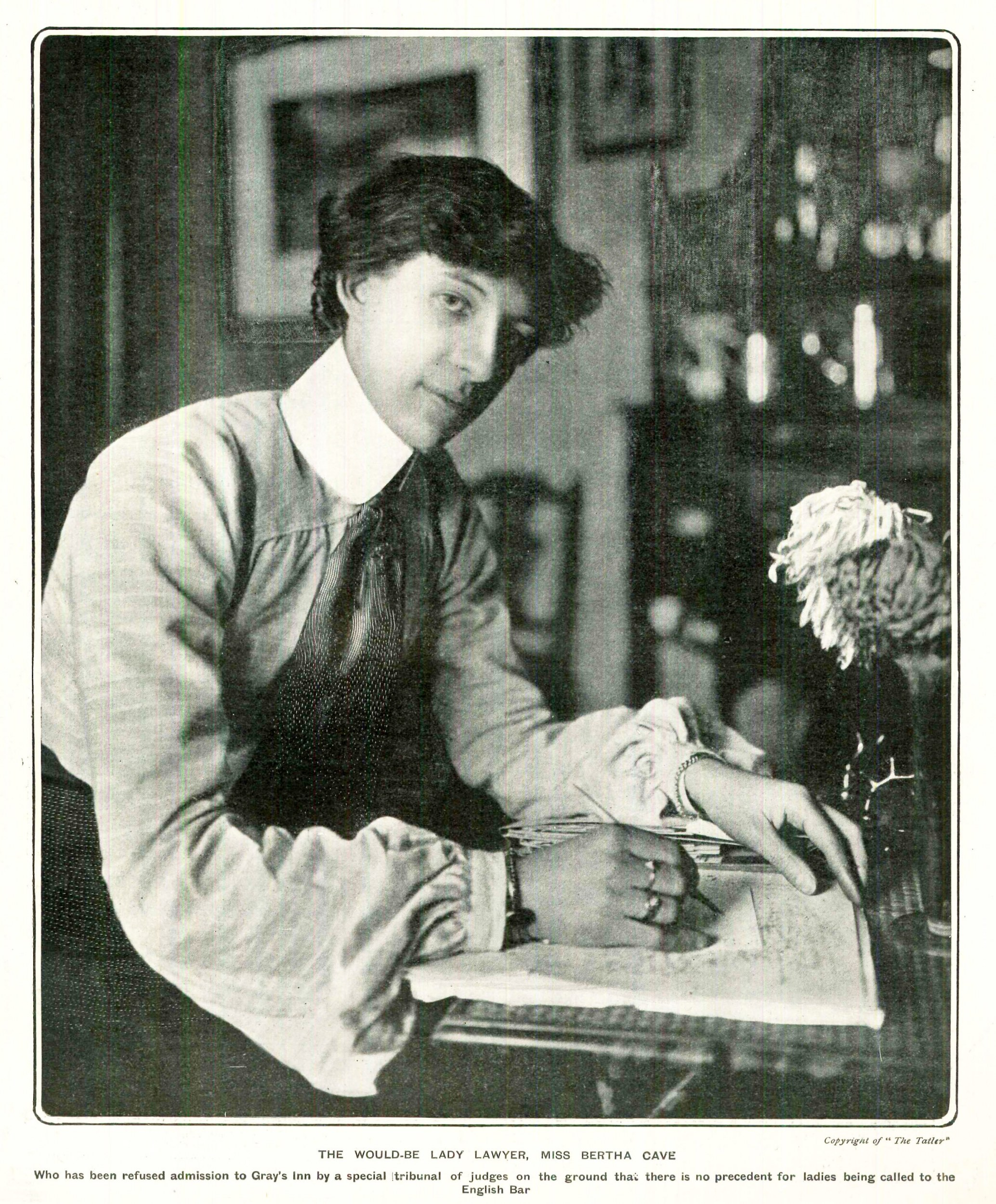
- Born: 14 November 1881; Sundridge, Kent, England
- Died: 1951 (aged 69–70); Toronto, Canada

Bertha Cave (14 November 1881 – 1951) was an English legal campaigner who fought, unsuccessfully, to be accepted to the bar.

== Biography ==
Cave was born in Sundridge, Kent on 14 November 1881, the eldest of two children of Annie (née Barker) and James Thomas Cave. Her mother was a servant and her father was a butler for William Tipping. She attended Miss Luker's private day school in the High Street, Brasted and the National School in Brasted.

On 3 March 1903, Cave applied to become the first female member of the Gray's Inn, as it was necessary to be a member of one of the Inns of Court in order to be called to the bar. She was mistakenly accepted which was soon changed and she was rejected on the basis of her gender. Cave appealed and in December of the same year, the case was heard, in proceedings that lasted 10 minutes, in the House of Lords. It was argued that women "were under a disability by reason of their sex". Again, she was unsuccessful, however, undeterred she continued her campaign alongside Christabel Pankhurst.

In January 1904, she and Pankhurst spoke at the Union Society of London ladies' debate night on the topic of the admission of women to the Inns of Court.

In November of that year, she attempted to represent her father in court (regarding non-payment of a bicycle) however, objections were raised regarding her gender and she was forced to move from the counsel benches.

Cave unofficially married Colonel Ali Altaf (or Altof), a barrister, on 1 December 1905 and they travelled to India where Altaf became Advocate to the Chief Court of the Punjab. They returned to England in 1912 when the marriage was over and she lived in Shepherd's Bush and Hackney until 1920.

On 16 June 1920, she became a fellow of the Royal Microscopical Society and then emigrated with her mother to Canada on 18 November 1920. She worked as a bacteriologist in Nova Scotia. Her final years were spent in Toronto where she died in 1951.
