= Home Quarters Warehouse =

American home improvement store chain

- Industry: Home improvement retail
- Founded: 1984
- Defunct: September 1999
- Fate: Liquidation
- Headquarters: Virginia Beach, Virginia, U.S.

Home Quarters Warehouse (HQ) was an American chain of "big-box" home improvement stores, originally based in Virginia Beach, Virginia. In 1984, the chemical manufacturing company W.R. Grace & Co. announced its intentions to enter the home improvement retail business, hiring Bernard R. Kossar and Frank Doczi to head the new chain.

== History ==
The first Home Quarters stores opened on February 28, 1985 in Virginia Beach and Hampton, Virginia. Grace spun off HQ in 1986, and in October 1987 HQ was in the midst of doing an IPO when "Black Monday" occurred. The SEC put a moratorium on any initial public offering (IPO) until the stock market stabilized.

In December 1987, Hechinger agreed to buy HQ for $66 million (~$156 million in 2024). The merger was completed in February 1988, with Frank Doczi left in charge of the Home Quarters division (Kossar moves on to found OW Office Warehouse, an office supply store that used a logo and branding similar to that of HQ). Under Hechinger, HQ expanded to much of the United States as a viable competitor to Home Depot, Lowe's, and Builders Square.

An abandoned Home Quarters Warehouse

== Merger ==
By 1995 its parent company Hechinger was facing financial trouble and began to scale back its operations, including moving HQ's headquarters from Virginia Beach to Hechinger's main office in Landover, Maryland. The Hechinger family sold the company to Los Angeles investors Leonard Green & Partners for $507 million (~$917 million in 2024) in July 1997, and the new management launched new, smaller concept stores called Better Spaces and Wye River Hardware & Home searching for a niche. In September, Hechinger/HQ was merged with San Antonio, Texas-based Builders Square, formerly owned by Kmart.

== Liquidation ==
After several rounds of store closings, Hechinger Co. and Home Quarters Warehouse filed for Chapter 11 bankruptcy protection on June 11, 1999, but the reorganization failed. That September, Hechinger's assets were liquidated, including its 117 remaining stores.

== See also ==
- Handy Andy Home Improvement Center
