= Wilbur Cave =

American politician

- Education: University of South Carolina
- Occupation: Politician
- Spouse: Janice R. Dillard
- Children: 4

Wilbur Cave is an American politician, former sheriff and philanthropist from South Carolina, USA.

== Early life ==
Wilbur Cave was born in an African-American family in Allendale, South Carolina. His maternal family owned a cotton farm in Allendale County. His mother was a schoolteacher at the Allendale County Training School.

Cave graduated from the University of South Carolina in Columbia, South Carolina in 1977.

== Career ==
Cave worked in substance abuse prevention for the Barnwell school district and for the town administration of Allendale. He was a field representative for Democratic Congressman Butler Derrick.

Cave served in the South Carolina House of Representatives from 1994 to 2000, representing district 91. He retired in 2000. Shortly after his retirement, Resolution S*0672 was passed both in the South Carolina House of Representatives and in the South Carolina Senate to honor his public service.

Cave is the founder of Allendale County Alive, a non-profit organization whose aim is to bring housing to the impoverished residents of Allendale County, South Carolina.

== Personal life ==
Cave is married to Janice R. Dillard. They have four children: Alisha, Julius, Frederick, and Renee. Cave is a congregant of the Union United Methodist Church.
