= Harold Hall Australian expeditions =

Ornithological collecting expeditions

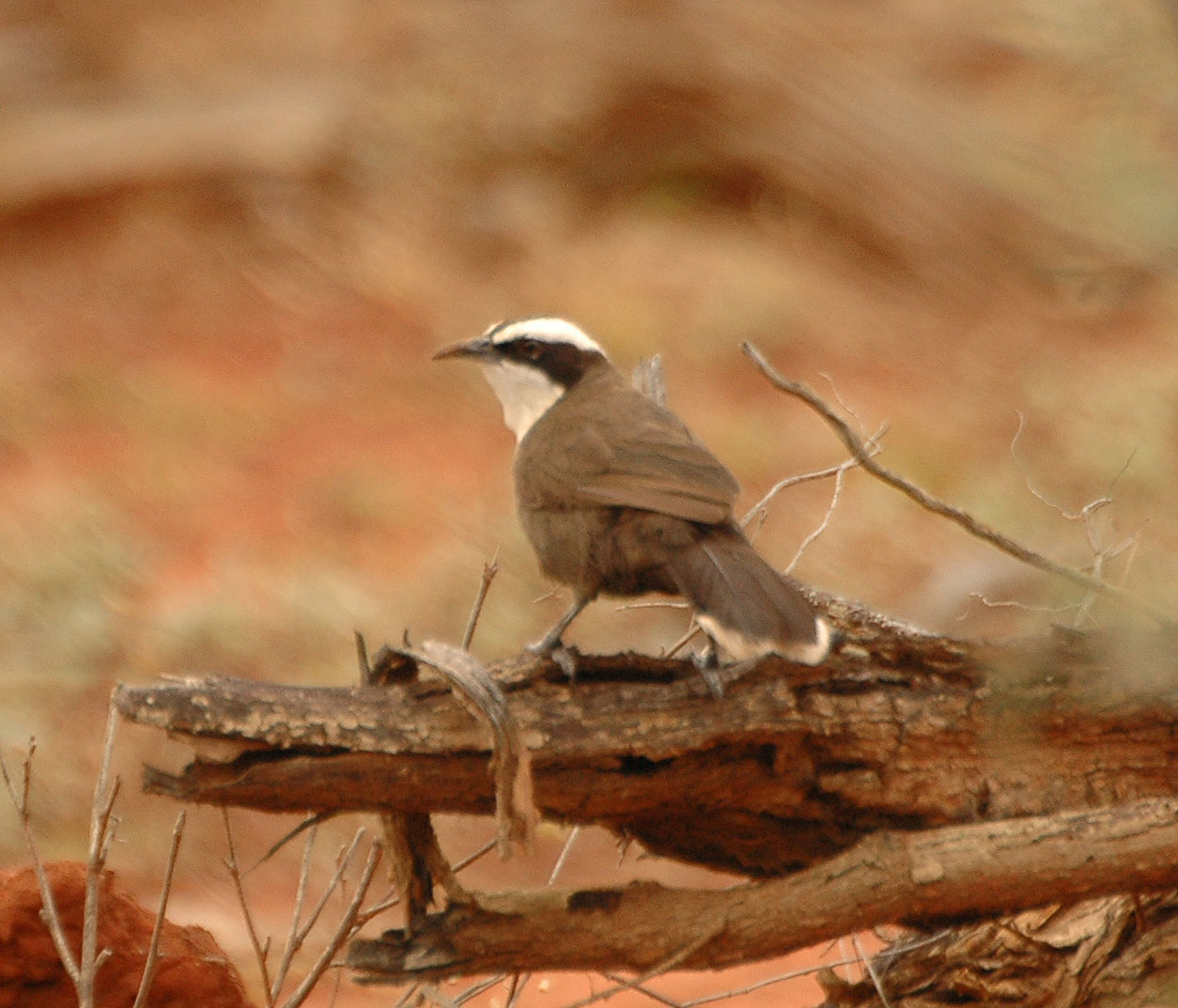
Hall's babbler was discovered in the course of the expeditions

The Harold Hall Australian expeditions comprise a series of five main ornithological collecting expeditions carried out in the 1960s and covering much of the Australian continent.

== Organisation ==
The expeditions were organised by the Zoology Department of the British Museum of Natural History in London to expand their holdings of Australian bird specimens following the sale of both the Rothschild and Mathews collections to the United States. The expeditions were sponsored by Australian-born philanthropist Major Harold Wesley Hall who gave the museum a grant of £25,000 to enable the expeditions to take place. The series of expeditions aroused some opposition within Australia on both nationalistic and conservation grounds, and formed the last systematic collecting effort of Australian birds by an overseas institution. However, the organisers worked closely and well with Australian ornithologists and museums. Mrs Pat Hall (no relation of the sponsor), in the introduction to the main report on the expeditions, says:

"It was estimated that five expeditions could be equipped and mounted from London, each costing £5000. Each would consist of about six people travelling in three Land Rovers, some of the members being from the British Museum (Natural History) and some from Australian museums, assisted by amateurs from both countries, and each would last about six months. Routes were planned with three objectives: first to provide the British Museum (Natural History) with a representative collection of Australian birds; second, to explore some areas which were poorly known ornithologically; third, to allow the Head of the Bird Room, Mr J. D. Macdonald to visit on the first Expedition as many State Museums as possible to prepare the way for subsequent expeditions. In addition each expedition had to end up and store vehicles and equipment at some place from which it was practicable to start the next expedition six months later.

"The basic plan was as follows:

- 1st Expedition. Land Perth; cross quickly to Melbourne; collect in Victoria, New South Wales and southern Queensland; finish Brisbane.
- 2nd Expedition. Start Brisbane; move quickly north to collect in northern Queensland; finish Melbourne.
- 3rd Expedition. Start Melbourne; move quickly into South Australia; collect in the desert areas of South Australia and Western Australia; finish Perth.
- 4th Expedition. Start and finish Perth; collect in extreme southwest and in western districts of Western Australia north to the Hamersley Range.
- 5th Expedition. Start and finish Perth; collect in Kimberleys and Arnhem Land.

"This plan was carried out in the six years between November 1962 and 1968, most collecting being done in the Australian winters."

== Personnel ==
- The first expedition (November 1962 – June 1963) was led by J.D. Macdonald, whose wife Dr Betty Macdonald acted as expedition medical officer, caterer and cook. Other British Museum staff were G.S. Cowles and P.R. Colston. Australians involved with at least parts of the expedition included Allan McEvey and Bill Middleton as well as preparators R. Boswell (National Museum of Victoria) and R. Lossin (Australian Museum). Dom Serventy assisted with the organisation of the expedition in Perth.
- The second expedition (February – August 1964) was led by I.C.J. Galbraith, with Shane Parker and T. Andersen. Galbraith's wife was caterer and cook. Australians involved were I. McCallum and R.L. Pink.
- The third expedition (March – September 1965) was led by Mrs B.P. (Pat) Hall, with Derek Goodwin and G.S. Cowles, and cook J.E. Thomas. Australian participants included D.G. Nicholls, C.D.B. Thomas, Dom Serventy and Arthur Matthews. For the first month a participant was General Sir Gerald Lathbury, a member of the funding committee and the Governor of Gibraltar.
- The fourth expedition (February – June 1966) was led by Colin Harrison, with P.R. Colston and R.F. Dear. Harrison's wife served as caterer and cook.
- The fifth expedition (April – November 1968) was led by Major B.D. MacDonald Booth, with D.J. Freeman, Clifford Frith and R.A. Whistler. Australian participants were Harry Butler and A. Hiller.

== Methods ==
Much of the collecting was carried out from camps on cattle and sheep stations; the majority of birds collected were shot, though a few were mist-netted. Generally, stomach and crop contents were examined and identified, and skulls were examined for pneumatisation. Tongues were also preserved from most species collected.

== Results ==
The main objective of the expeditions – to provide a comprehensive and well-documented series of skins and anatomical specimens – was largely achieved. Types of new forms were deposited in the appropriate state museums. Specimens deposited in the British Museum comprised 4709 skins, 786 skeletons and 910 specimens in fluid. One new species, Hall's babbler, was discovered, and two new subspecies (of the white-quilled rock-pigeon and grey shrike-thrush) described, while new data were obtained from rare species such as the black grasswren and white-lined honeyeater. Several papers on the findings were published in various journals in a series titled "Results of the Harold Hall Australian Expeditions".
