= Hechinger =

American home improvement retailer

- Type: Private
- Industry: Retail
- Founded: 1911 (building wrecking and salvage); 1919 (retail hardware/home improvement); 2004 (online retailer)
- Founder: Sidney L. Hechinger
- Defunct: 1999 (home improvement retail); 2009 (online retailer)
- Fate: Bankruptcy and liquidation
- Headquarters: Landover, Maryland, U.S.
- Products: Lumber, tools, hardware, garden supplies and plants

The Hechinger Company was an American chain of home-improvement centers headquartered in Landover, Maryland, on the immediate outskirts of Washington, D.C., from 1911 to 1999. It was also an online retailer owned by Home Decor Products from 2004 to 2009.

== History ==
A newspaper advertisement for Hechinger products in 1963

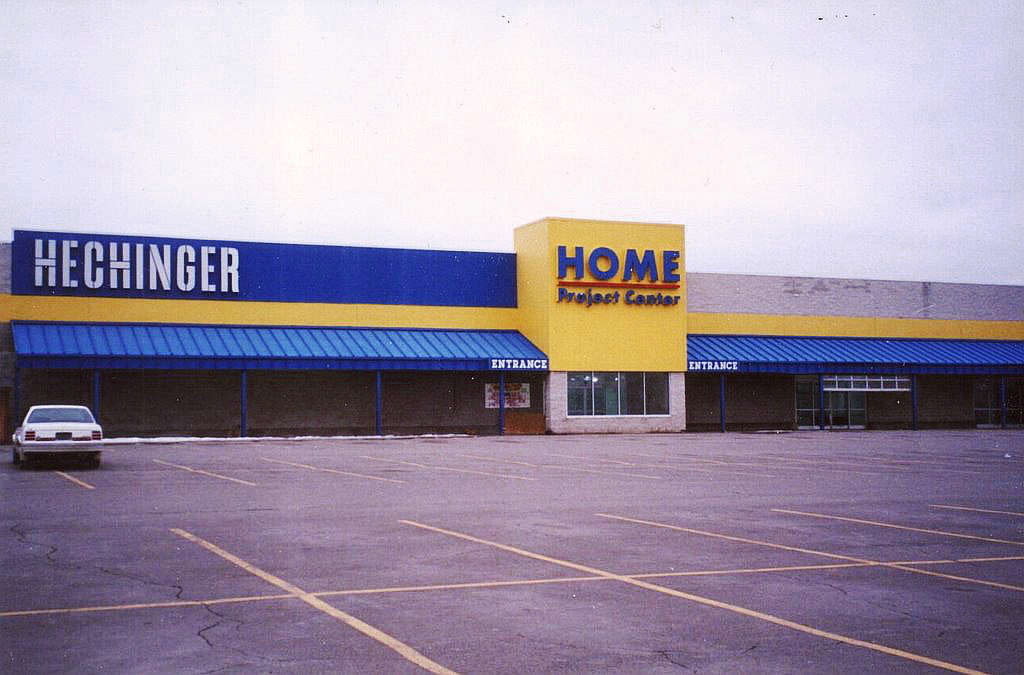
A Hechinger store in Wilkes-Barre, Pennsylvania, in 1999

Sidney L. Hechinger had initially established himself in the wrecking and salvage business in 1911, and in 1919 opened his first hardware store in Southwest Washington, D.C.

Sidney Hechinger focused his hardware business exclusively on retail customers in 1924, eschewing contractors and builders. His decision foresaw the rise of the home improvement industry before the sector even had a name.

The five-store company reorganized in 1953, with Sidney's son John and son-in-law Richard England becoming partners in the company, which was divided into a retail hardware business and a wholesale building supplies company, the latter being called Richard England Associates. John also served as the first appointed City Council chairman of Washington, D.C.

=== 1970s ===
In 1972, John Hechinger, Sr. and brother-in-law Richard England took the ten-store company public with an offering of 400,000 shares.

=== 1980s ===
John Hechinger, Jr. became the third generation of Hechingers to head the company when he was named president of the 54-store chain in 1986. Later that year, Hechinger Co. announced plans to reincorporate in Delaware, which was approved in a January 1987 shareholders' meeting.

Hechinger had grown to a 69-store chain by the time it made its December 1987 offer to acquire the six stores of Virginia Beach, Virginia-based Home Quarters Warehouse (HQ) for $66 million (~$160 million in 2025). HQ had been founded in 1984 by W.R. Grace & Co. in the mold of big-box stores such as Home Depot, and operated as a separate division of Hechinger Co.

In the 1980s, it underwent a massive expansion of both HQ and the Hechinger Co. divisions, opening big-box stores to better compete with rivals Home Depot and Lowe's.

=== 1990s ===
In January 1995, Hechinger announced it would close or reformat 22 of its 131 stores, including closing all 14 of the Home Quarters Warehouse stores in North and South Carolina. In August of that year, Hechinger Co. consolidated HQ with Hechinger in a further restructuring.

Searching for a niche, Hechinger management in 1997 launched new, smaller concept stores such as Better Spaces in Albany, New York in February and Wye River Hardware & Home in Wheaton and Rockville in August.

In July 1997, Los Angeles, California-based investors Leonard Green & Partners announced plans to buy Hechinger Co. for $3 per share, or about $127 million, intending to merge Hechinger with Builders Square, which it had purchased from Kmart for $10 million. However, when Hechinger posted a second quarter loss of $40.6 million in August, Leonard Green cut their offer price, and ultimately purchased Hechinger Company for $2.375 per share, or about $100.2 million, in September 1997.

After several rounds of store closings, the Hechinger Company filed for Chapter 11 bankruptcy protection on June 11, 1999, but the reorganization failed. Later that year, in September 1999, Hechinger's assets were liquidated, including its 117 remaining stores.

=== 2000s ===
In 2004, Home Décor Products bought the Hechinger brand name and opened an online retailer the following year, which sold the same products as the former brand. On February 5, 2009, it was announced that the site would shut down and Hechinger would no longer sell tools. The site closed shortly thereafter.
