= Builders Square =

Defunct American home improvement retailer

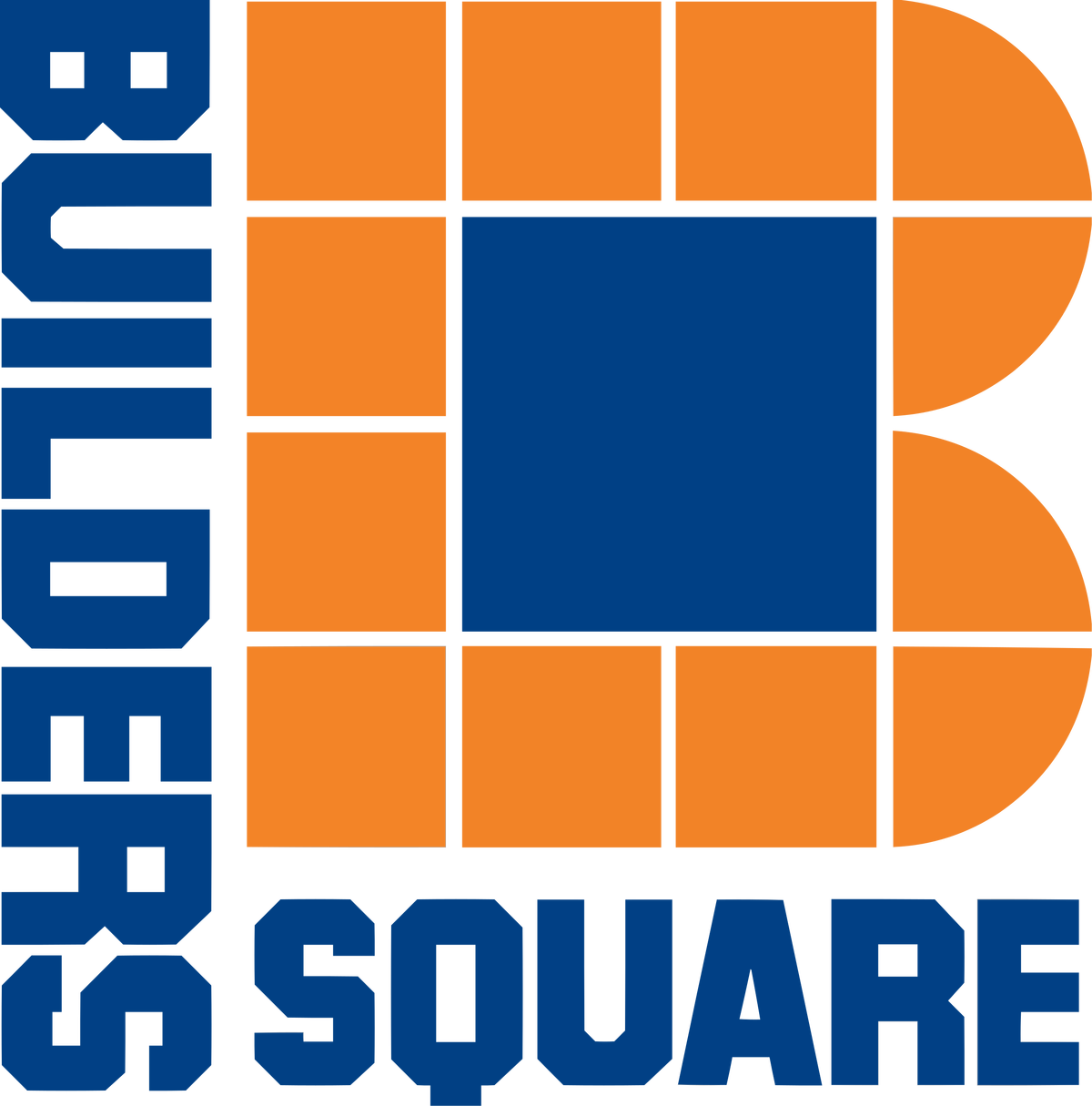
- Builders Square logo, 1984-1999
- Formerly: Home Centers of America; Home Pro Warehouse
- Type: Originally, home improvement retailer Second version, online retailer
- Industry: Retail
- Founded: February 16, 1983; 43 years ago (original); 2006; 20 years ago (as online retailer)
- Defunct: 1999; 27 years ago (original); 2009; 17 years ago (second version)
- Fate: Liquidation
- Successor: HomeClick
- Headquarters: Original company in San Antonio, Texas; Second version in Edison, New Jersey
- Products: Home Improvement, Home and Garden
- Website: web.archive.org/web/20080220003210/http://www.builderssquare.com (2008 archive)

Builders Square was a big-box home improvement retailer headquartered in San Antonio, Texas. A subsidiary of Kmart, its format was quite similar to The Home Depot, Menards, and Lowe's with floor space of about 100,000 square feet (9,300 m^{2}), and inventories in excess of 35,000 different items. In 1997, a Los Angeles leveraged buyout specialist acquired Builders Square and merged it with Hechinger but the new combined company failed to thrive and all remaining stores ceased business operations by the end of 1999.

Home Decor Products revived the Builders Square brand name in the mid-2000s as builderssquare.com, a comparison shopping website for home and garden products. It was headquartered in Edison, New Jersey. The website was abandoned in 2009.

== History ==
=== Beginnings ===
The company was founded on February 16, 1983 as Home Centers of America by Frank Denny, an executive who had recently been president of the home center subsidiary of W. R. Grace and Company. Somewhat unusually for the time, Home Centers of America was funded from the beginning as a public stock company. The company opened its first store under the name Home Pro Warehouse in San Antonio on May 28, 1983, in a former Woolco store. The chain would later expand to nine stores with locations in Corpus Christi, Houston, Lubbock, and San Antonio. Home Centers of America was sold to Kmart in June 1984 for $90 million (USD). The company and all stores were renamed Builders Square after acquisition, with the first stores opening under the Builders Square name in the Chicago, Illinois area on October 18, 1984. The nine Home Pro Warehouse stores would be converted to Builders Square on January 1, 1985. Denny would continue as Builders Square company president for several years and overseeing company expansion.

During the 1980s, Builders Square was a player in the fast-growing do-it-yourself consumer market, which included competitors National Lumber, The Home Depot, HomeClub, Builders Emporium, Ole's, Angels, and others.

On July 8, 1992, the first Builders Square II location would open in Sunrise, Florida. Compared to the existing Builders Square stores (now referred to as Builders Square I), these stores were larger and more upscale, with the central part of the store being referred to as the "Idea Center", a center that showcased kitchen and bathroom designs. Going forward, all Builders Square I stores would either be converted to the new format or be replaced by newer locations.

By 1997, the chain operated 162 stores in Alabama, California, Colorado, Connecticut, Florida, Illinois, Indiana, Kansas, Kentucky, Massachusetts, Michigan, Minnesota, Missouri, New Hampshire, New Jersey, New Mexico, New York, Nevada, North Carolina, North Dakota, Ohio, Oklahoma, Oregon, Pennsylvania, Rhode Island, South Dakota, Texas, Virginia, Wisconsin, and Puerto Rico. However, despite a $700 million investment by its parent company, high-profile sponsorships that included the Alamo Bowl, and celebrity spokespeople such as Al Michaels, Darrell Waltrip and Tim Allen, the chain was not able to maintain profitability. The last Builders Square location would open on May 2, 1996, in Sterling Heights, Michigan.

=== Hechinger and bankruptcy ===
In 1997, Kmart and Leonard Green & Partners agreed to merge Hechinger and Builders Square as the third-largest home improvement retail chain in the United States. Store closures were underway in early 1999; for example, in February the company announced the closure of 16 stores in the Chicago area. Hechinger filed for Chapter 11 bankruptcy reorganization in June 1999. The reorganization effort resulted in closure of a large number of stores and the sale of others to The Home Depot. All remaining Builders Square stores were converted to the Home Quarters brand. However, the reorganization plan was not successful and Hechinger filed for Chapter 7 liquidation in September 1999. The six locations in Puerto Rico were bought out by Empresas Masso (Masso Enterprises), a local chain of home improvement stores, which in turn sold the stores to The Home Depot in 2000.

=== Return ===
Builders Square re-emerged in 2006 as an online shopping comparison site focused exclusively on the home and garden market after the parent company, Home Decor Products, purchased rights to the Builders Square name. Home Decor Products filed Chapter 7 bankruptcy in April 2009 and ceased operations, but former executives purchased all assets as a new virtual company, HomeClick LLC. They dropped the Builders Square brand and the now-dead builderssquare.com website.
