= John Cave (rugby union) =

England international rugby union player

- Full name: John Watkins Cave
- Born: 5 February 1867 Surbiton, England
- Died: 4 December 1949 (aged 82) Wokingham, England

Rugby union career
- Position: Forward
International career
Years	Team	Apps	(Points)
1889	England	1	(0)

John Watkins Cave (5 February 1867 – 4 December 1949) was an English international rugby union player.

Born in Surbiton, Cave was the son of High Court judge Sir Lewis Cave and attended Trinity College, Cambridge.

Cave was awarded a rugby blue for Cambridge University in 1888. The following year, Cave made his only international appearance for England when he was capped against the touring New Zealand "Native" team, which was largely made up of those of Maori ancestry. He also played rugby for Richmond.

A school teacher, Cave was for many years an assistant master at Wellington College.

== See also ==
- List of England national rugby union players
