= James Macdonald (ornithologist) =

James David Macdonald FRSE FLS FZS FIB (3 October 1908 – 17 September 2002) was a Scottish-Australian ornithologist and ornithological writer. A traditional museum ornithologist, he did much to build up the collections of African and Australian birds held by the British Museum, as well as popularising ornithology through his writings.

== Education and career ==
Macdonald was born in the village of Foyers, 32 km (20 mi) from Inverness in Scotland. He attended Foyers Public School from 1913 to 1924 before obtaining a bursary to complete his secondary education at the Inverness Royal Academy, from which he graduated Dux in Art in 1927. He studied natural science at the University of Aberdeen, graduating with a BSc in Forestry in 1930 and in Pure Science (botany and zoology) in 1932, following which he carried out research on decapod crustaceans with the Scottish Fisheries Board and the Plymouth Marine Laboratory.

In 1935 Macdonald was appointed to a position at the British Natural History Museum in London where he was, despite his protestations of complete ignorance about birds, placed in the bird section as Assistant Keeper. Apart from service with the British Admiralty during the Second World War, he stayed with the museum for the rest of his career, becoming Senior Scientific Officer in charge of the Bird Room and Deputy Keeper of the Zoology Department by the time of his retirement in 1968.

=== Expeditions ===
As part of his job with the museum, Macdonald organised bird collecting expeditions to the mountains of the southern Sudan in 1938–1939 and to the arid regions of south-western South Africa and South West Africa, including the Kalahari Desert, in 1950–1951. In 1962–1963 he led the first of the Harold Hall Expeditions to collect bird specimens in Australia.

In 1962 he was elected a Fellow of the Royal Society of Edinburgh. His proposers were D. A. Bannerman, Sir Landsborough Thomson, Sir George Taylor, Edward Hindle and V. C. Wynne-Edwards. He resigned from the Society in 1987.

== Retirement ==
In 1968 Macdonald moved to Brisbane, Australia, to write a book, Birds of Australia: A Summary of Information, which was dedicated to Harold Hall and published in time for the 1974 International Ornithological Congress in Canberra. He was active in the establishment of the Queensland Ornithological Society in 1969, of which he was the founding President.

Macdonald died peacefully in Brisbane at the age of 93, survived by his wife, Dr Betty Macdonald, to whom he had been married for 64 years.

== Honours ==
Recognition of Macdonald's abilities and achievements as an ornithologist include:

- Member of the Permanent Committee of the International Ornithological Congress
- Councillor and Vice President of the British Ornithologists' Union
- Corresponding Fellow of the American Ornithologists' Union
- Fellow of the Royal Society of Edinburgh
- Fellow of the Linnean Society of London
- Fellow of the Zoological Society of London
- Fellow of the Institute of Biology
- Honorary Life Member of the Queensland Ornithological Society

== Publications ==
As well as about 70 papers in the scientific literature, books authored or coauthored by Macdonald include:

- 1949 – Birds of Britain. A guide to the common species. Bell & Sons: London.
- 1955 – Birds of the Sudan: Their Identification and Distribution. Oliver & Boyd: Edinburgh. (With Francis O. Cave.)
- 1957 – Contribution to the Ornithology of Western South Africa. Results of the British Museum (Natural History) South West Africa Expedition, 1949-1950. Trustees of the British Museum: London.
- 1959 – Instructions to Young Ornithologists: Bird Biology. Museum Press: London.
- 1962 – Curiosities of Bird Life. Castle Books: New York.
- 1962 – Bird Behavior. Sterling Publishing: New York. (With Derek Goodwin and Helmut E. Adler).
- 1973 – Birds of Australia: A Summary of Information. A.H. & A.W. Reed: Sydney. (Illustrated by Peter Slater). ISBN 0-589-07117-3
- 1980 – Birds for Beginners: How birds live and behave. Reed: Sydney. ISBN 0-589-50102-X
- 1982 – Understanding Australian Birds. Reed: Sydney.
- 1985 – Australian Birds. A Popular Guide To Bird Life. Reed: Sydney. ISBN 0-7301-0081-2
- 1987 – The Illustrated Dictionary of Australian Birds By Common Name. Reed: Sydney. ISBN 0-7301-0184-3
