= Southern Rhodesia in World War II =

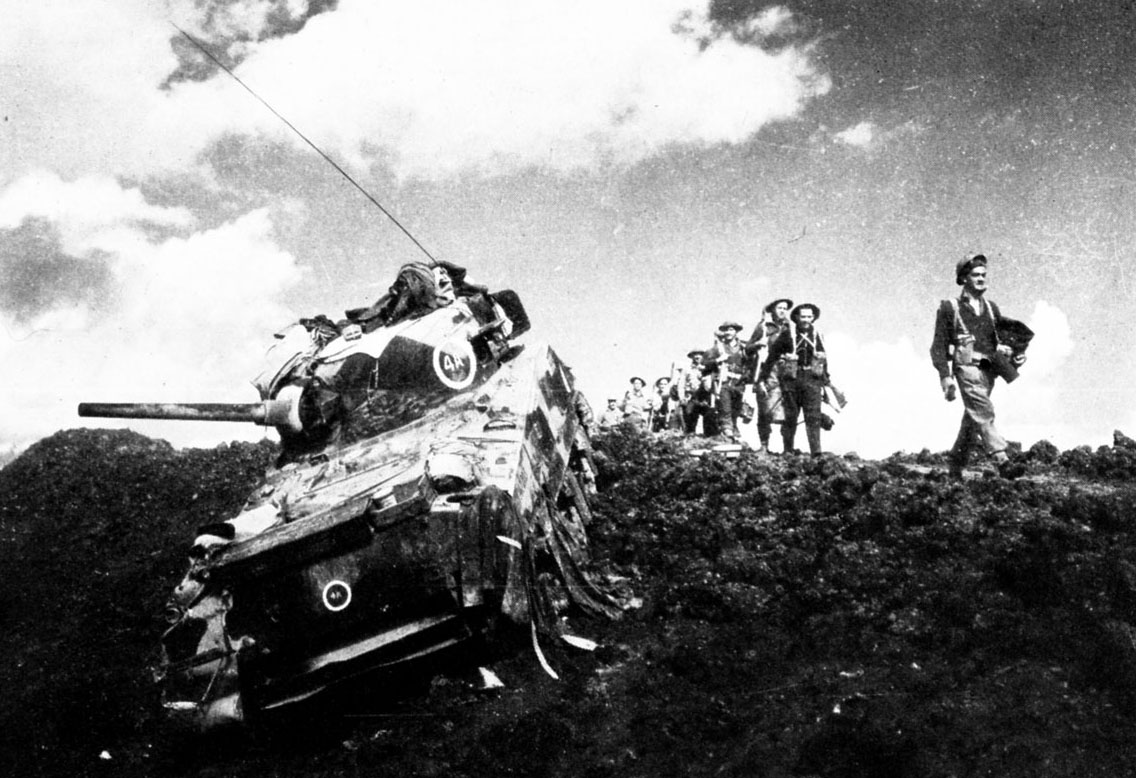
A Southern Rhodesian Sherman tank of the Special Service Battalion during the Italian Campaign

Southern Rhodesia, then a self-governing colony of the United Kingdom that was located in the now-independent Zimbabwe, entered World War II along with Britain shortly after the invasion of Poland in 1939. By the war's end, 26,121 Southern Rhodesians of all races had served in the armed forces, 8,390 of them overseas, operating in the European theatre, the Mediterranean and Middle East theatre, East Africa, Burma and elsewhere. The territory's most important contribution to the war is commonly held to be its contribution to the Empire Air Training Scheme (EATS), under which 8,235 British, Commonwealth and Allied airmen were trained in Southern Rhodesian flying schools. The colony's operational casualties numbered 916 killed and 483 wounded of all races.

Southern Rhodesia had no diplomatic powers, but largely oversaw its own contributions of manpower and materiel to the war effort, being responsible for its own defence. Rhodesian officers and soldiers were distributed in small groups throughout the British and South African forces in an attempt to prevent high losses. Most of the colony's men served in Britain, East Africa and the Mediterranean, particularly at first; a more broad dispersal occurred from late 1942. Rhodesian servicemen in operational areas were mostly from the country's white minority, with the Rhodesian African Rifles—made up of black troops and white officers—providing the main exception in Burma from late 1944. Other non-white soldiers and white servicewomen served in East Africa and on the home front within Southern Rhodesia. Tens of thousands of black men were conscripted from rural communities for work, first on the aerodromes and later on white-owned farms.

World War II prompted major changes in Southern Rhodesia's financial and military policy, and accelerated the process of industrialisation. The territory's participation in the EATS brought about major economic and infrastructural developments and led to the post-war immigration of many former airmen, contributing to the growth of the white population to over double its pre-war size by 1951. The war remained prominent in the national consciousness for decades afterwards. Since the country's reconstitution as Zimbabwe in 1980, the modern government has removed many references to the World Wars, such as memorial monuments and plaques, from public view, regarding them as unwelcome vestiges of white minority rule and colonialism, despite many Rhodesian servicemen serving in the war being black.

== Background ==
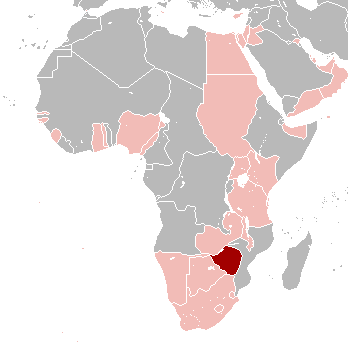
Southern Rhodesia in red; other Commonwealth territories in pink

When World War II broke out in 1939, the southern African territory of Southern Rhodesia (Note: Renamed Zimbabwe in 1980.) had been a self-governing colony of the United Kingdom for 16 years, having gained responsible government in 1923. It was unique in the British Empire and Commonwealth in that it held extensive autonomous powers (including defence, but not foreign affairs) while lacking dominion status. In practice, it acted as a quasi-dominion, and was treated as such in many ways by the rest of the Commonwealth. Southern Rhodesia's white population in 1939 was 67,000, a minority of about 5%; the black population was a little over a million, and there were about 10,000 residents of coloured (mixed) or Indian ethnicity. The franchise was non-racial and in theory open to all, contingent on meeting financial and educational qualifications, but in practice very few black citizens were on the electoral roll. The colony's Prime Minister was Godfrey Huggins, a physician and veteran of World War I (1914–18) who had emigrated to Rhodesia from England in 1911 and held office since 1933.

The territory's contribution to the British cause during World War I had been very large in proportion to its white population, though troops had been mostly raised from scratch as there had been no professional standing army beforehand. Since the start of self-government in 1923, the colony had organised the all-white Rhodesia Regiment into a permanent defence force, complemented locally by the partly paramilitary British South Africa Police (BSAP). The Rhodesia Regiment comprised about 3,000 men, including reserves, in 1938. The country had fielded black troops during World War I, but since then had retained them only within the BSAP. A nucleus of airmen existed in the form of the Southern Rhodesian Air Force (SRAF), which in August 1939 comprised one squadron of 10 pilots and eight Hawker Hardy aircraft, based at Belvedere Airport near Salisbury. (Note: The SRAF was formally called the Southern Rhodesian Air Unit (SRAU) until 19 September 1939.)

The occupation of Czechoslovakia by Nazi Germany in March 1939 convinced Huggins that war was imminent. Seeking to renew his government's mandate to pass emergency measures, he called an early election in which his United Party won an increased majority. Huggins rearranged his Cabinet on a war footing, making the Minister of Justice Robert Tredgold Minister of Defence as well. (Note: Robert Blake comments in his History of Rhodesia that while this coupling "would be odd in any other country, [it] was quite natural in Southern Rhodesia" as the British South Africa Police comprised much of the first line of defence.) The territory proposed forces not only for internal security but also for the defence of British interests overseas. Self-contained Rhodesian formations were planned, including a mechanised reconnaissance unit, but Tredgold opposed this. Remembering the catastrophic casualties suffered by units such as the Royal Newfoundland Regiment and the 1st South African Infantry Brigade on the Western Front in World War I, he argued that one or two heavy defeats for a white Southern Rhodesian brigade might cause crippling losses and have irrevocable effects on the country as a whole. He proposed to instead concentrate on training white Rhodesians for leadership roles and specialist units, and to disperse the colony's men across the forces in small groups. These ideas met with approval in both Salisbury and London and were adopted.

Southern Rhodesia would be automatically included in any British declaration of war due to its lack of diplomatic powers, but that did not stop the colonial government from attempting to demonstrate its loyalty and legislative independence through supportive parliamentary motions and gestures. The Southern Rhodesian parliament unanimously moved to support Britain in the event of war during a special sitting on 28 August 1939.

== Outbreak of war ==
When Britain declared war on Germany on 3 September 1939 following the invasion of Poland, Southern Rhodesia issued its own declaration of war almost immediately, before any of the dominions did. Huggins backed full military mobilisation and "a war to the finish", telling parliament that the conflict was one of national survival for Southern Rhodesia as well as for Britain; the mother country's defeat would leave little hope for the colony in the post-war world, he said. (Note: Huggins predicted that Rhodesia would be occupied by Germany if the Allies lost the war. Blake agrees with this assessment in his History of Rhodesia, writing that the colony "could not have survived" an Axis victory.) This stand was almost unanimously supported by the white populace, as well as most of the coloured community, though with World War I a recent memory this was more out of a sense of patriotic duty than enthusiasm for war in itself. The majority of the black population paid little attention to the outbreak of war.

The British had expected Fascist Italy—with its African possessions—to join the war on Germany's side as soon as it began, but fortunately for the Allies this did not immediately occur. No. 1 Squadron SRAF was already in northern Kenya, having been posted to the Italian East African frontier at Britain's request in late August. The first Southern Rhodesian ground forces to be deployed abroad during World War II were 50 Territorial troops under Captain T G Standing, who were posted to Nyasaland in September at the request of the colonial authorities there to guard against a possible uprising by German expatriates. They returned home after a month, having seen little action. White Rhodesian officers and non-commissioned officers left the colony in September and October 1939 to command units of black Africans in the west and east of the continent, with most joining the Royal West African Frontier Force (RWAFF) in the Colony of Nigeria, the Gold Coast and neighbouring colonies. The deployment of white Rhodesian officers and NCOs to command black troops from elsewhere in Africa met with favour from the military leadership and became very prevalent.

"All I wish to say to you is this: we know that you will carry on the traditions that this young colony established in the last war."

— Huggins to a draft of 700 Rhodesians bound for the Middle East, 14 April 1940

As in World War I, white Rhodesians volunteered for the forces readily and in large numbers. Over 2,700 had come forward before the war was three weeks old. Somewhat ironically, the Southern Rhodesian recruiters' main problem was not sourcing manpower but rather persuading men in strategically important occupations such as mining to stay home. Manpower controls were introduced to keep certain men in their civilian jobs. The SRAF accepted 500 recruits in the days following the outbreak of war, prompting its commander Group Captain Charles Meredith to contact the Air Ministry in London with an offer to run a flying school and train three squadrons. This was accepted. In January 1940 the Southern Rhodesian government announced the establishment of an independent Air Ministry to oversee the Rhodesian Air Training Group, Southern Rhodesia's contribution to the Empire Air Training Scheme (EATS).

Huggins set up a Defence Committee within the Cabinet to co-ordinate the colony's war effort in early 1940. This body comprised the Prime Minister, Tredgold and Lieutenant-Colonel Ernest Lucas Guest, the Minister of Mines and Public Works, who was put in charge of the new Air Ministry. (Note: Blake explains that although at first glance counterintuitive, this combination of portfolios made sense as the Public Works Ministry would have to build the airfields.) About 1,600 of the colony's whites were serving overseas by May 1940 when, during the Battle of France, Salisbury passed legislation allowing the authorities to call up any male British subject of European ancestry aged between 19 and a half and 25 who had lived in the colony for at least six months. The minimum age was reduced to 18 in 1942. Part-time training was compulsory for all white males between 18 and 55, with a small number of exceptions for those in reserved occupations. On 25 May 1940 Southern Rhodesia, the last country to join the EATS, became the first to start operating an air school under it, beating Canada by a week. The SRAF was absorbed into the British Royal Air Force in April 1940, with No. 1 Squadron becoming No. 237 Squadron. The RAF subsequently designated two more Rhodesian squadrons, namely No. 266 Squadron in 1940 and No. 44 Squadron in 1941, in a manner similar to the Article XV squadrons from Australia, Canada and New Zealand.

== Africa and the Mediterranean ==
=== Early deployments ===
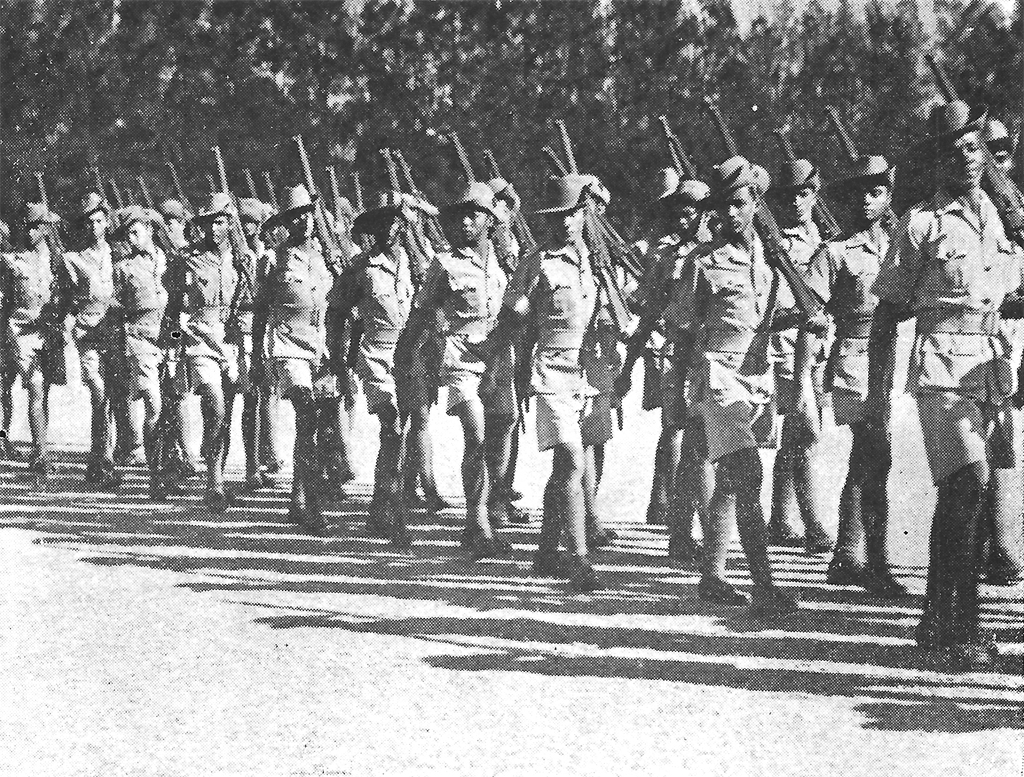
Coloured and Indian-Rhodesian drivers parading in Salisbury before going to East Africa, 1940

No. 237 Squadron, based in Kenya since before the start of the war, had expanded to 28 officers and 209 other ranks by March 1940. By mid-1940, most of the officers and men Southern Rhodesia had sent overseas were in Kenya, attached to various East African formations, the King's African Rifles (KAR), the RWAFF, or to the colony's own Medical Corps or Survey Unit. The Southern Rhodesian surveyors charted the previously unmapped area bordering Abyssinia and Italian Somaliland between March and June 1940, and the Medical Corps operated No. 2 General Hospital in Nairobi from July. A company of coloured and Indian-Rhodesian transport drivers was also in the country, having arrived in January.

The first Southern Rhodesian contingent despatched to North Africa and the Middle East was a draft of 700 from the Rhodesia Regiment who left in April 1940. No white Rhodesian force of this size had ever left the territory before. They were posted to a variety of British units across Egypt and Palestine. The largest concentration of Rhodesian soldiers in North Africa belonged to the King's Royal Rifle Corps (KRRC), whose connections with the colony dated back to World War I. Several Rhodesian platoons were formed in the KRRC's 1st Battalion in the Western Desert. A company of men from the Southern Rhodesian Signal Corps was also present, operating in tandem with the British Royal Corps of Signals.

=== East Africa ===
Italy joined the war on Germany's side on 10 June 1940, opening the East African Campaign and the Desert War in North Africa. A Rhodesian-led force of irregulars from the Somaliland Camel Corps—based in British Somaliland, on the Horn of Africa's north coast—took part in one of the first clashes between British and Italian forces when it exchanged fire with an Italian banda (irregular company) around dawn on 11 June. Two days later three Caproni bombers of the Regia Aeronautica attacked Wajir, one of No. 237 Squadron's forward airstrips, damaging two Rhodesian aircraft.

Italian East Africa was bordered by Kenya to the south, British Somaliland to the north-east, and the Sudan to the west

Italian forces entered British Somaliland from Abyssinia on 4 August 1940, overcame the garrison at Hargeisa, and advanced north-east towards the capital Berbera. The British force, including a platoon of 43 Rhodesians in the 2nd Battalion of the Black Watch, took up positions on six hills overlooking the only road towards Berbera and engaged the Italians at the Battle of Tug Argan. Amid heavy fighting, the Italians gradually made gains and by 14 August had almost pocketed the Commonwealth forces. The British retreated to Berbera between 15 and 17 August, the Rhodesians making up the left flank of the rearguard, and by 18 August had evacuated by sea. The Italians took the city and completed their conquest of British Somaliland a day later.

No. 237 Squadron embarked on reconnaissance flights and supported ground assaults on Italian desert outposts during July and August 1940. Two British brigades from West Africa arrived to reinforce Kenya's northern frontier in early July—the partly Rhodesian-officered Nigeria Regiment joined the front at Malindi and Garissa, while a battalion of the Gold Coast Regiment, also with Rhodesian commanders attached, relieved the KAR at Wajir. The British forces in East Africa adopted the doctrine of "mobile defence" that was already being used in the Western Desert in North Africa—units embarked on long, constant patrols to guard wells and deny water supplies to the Italians. The British evacuated their north forward position at Buna in September 1940, and expected an attack on Wajir soon after, but the Italians never attempted an assault. Boosted considerably by the arrival of three South African brigades during the last months of 1940, the Commonwealth forces in Kenya had expanded to three divisions by the end of the year. No. 237 Squadron was relieved by South African airmen and redeployed to the Sudan in September.

Rebasing at Khartoum, No. 237 Squadron undertook regular reconnaissance, dive-bombing and strafing sorties during October and November 1940. Meanwhile, the Southern Rhodesian Anti-Tank Battery arrived in Kenya in October and, following a period of training, received 2-pounder guns and joined the front at Garissa around the turn of the new year. No. 237 Squadron was partially re-equipped during January 1941, receiving some Westland Lysander Mk IIs, but most of the squadron continued operating Hardys.

The British forces in Kenya under General Alan Cunningham, including Rhodesian officers and NCOs in the King's African Rifles and the Nigeria and Gold Coast Regiments, as well as the South African 1st South African Infantry Division, advanced into Abyssinia and Italian Somaliland during late January and February 1941, starting with the occupation of the ports of Kismayo and Mogadishu. The Italians retreated to the interior. No. 237 Squadron meanwhile provided air support to the 4th Indian Infantry Division and 5th Indian Infantry Division during Lieutenant-General William Platt's offensive into Eritrea from the Sudan, attacking ground targets and engaging Italian fighters. One of the Rhodesian Hardys was shot down near Keren on 7 February with the loss of both occupants. Two days later, five Italian fighters attacked a group of grounded Rhodesian aircraft at Agordat in western Eritrea, and wrecked two Hardys and two Lysanders.

Platt's advance into Eritrea was checked during the seven-week Battle of Keren (February–April 1941), during which No. 237 Squadron observed Italian positions and took part in bombing raids. After the Italians retreated and surrendered, the Rhodesian squadron moved forward to Asmara on 6 April, whence it embarked on bombing sorties on the port of Massawa. The same day, the Italian garrison in the Abyssinian capital Addis Ababa surrendered to the 11th (East Africa) Division, including many Rhodesians. During the Battle of Amba Alagi, Platt and Cunningham's forces converged and surrounded the remainder of the Italians, who were commanded by the Duke of Aosta at the mountainous stronghold of Amba Alagi. The viceroy surrendered on 18 May 1941, effectively ending the war in East Africa. No. 237 Squadron and the Rhodesian Anti-Tank Battery thereupon moved up to Egypt to join the war in the Western Desert. Some Italian garrisons continued to fight—the last surrendered only following the Battle of Gondar in November 1941. Until this time the partly Rhodesian-commanded Nigeria and Gold Coast Regiments remained in Abyssinia, patrolling and rounding up scattered Italian units. Around 250 officers and 1,000 other ranks from Southern Rhodesia remained in Kenya until mid-1943.

=== North Africa ===
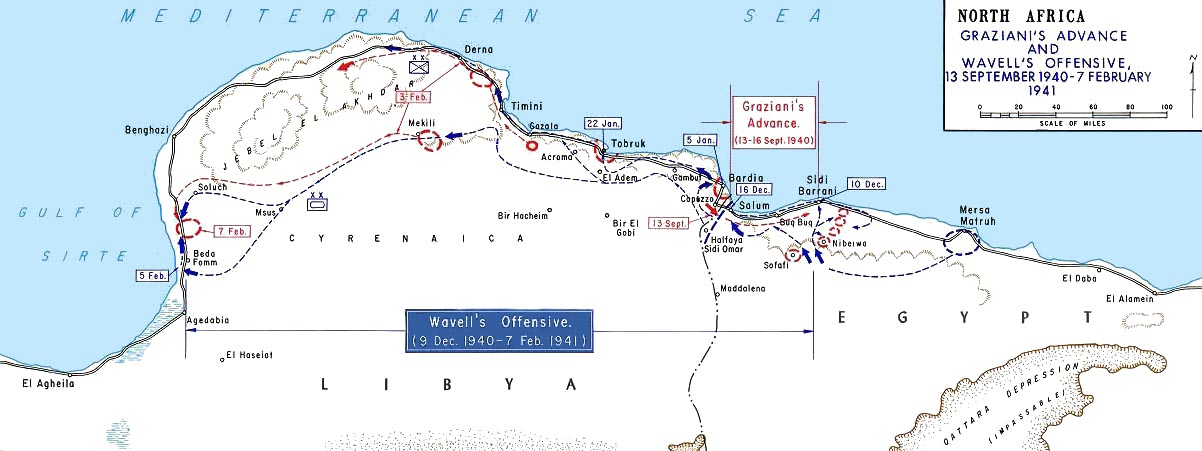
The progress of Operation Compass and strategic locations. Benghazi is to the north-west, Tobruk is on the coast near the map's centre, and El Alamein is to the east.

In North Africa, Rhodesians in the 11th Hussars, 2nd Leicesters, 1st Cheshires and other regiments contributed to Operation Compass between December 1940 and February 1941 as part of the Western Desert Force under Major-General Richard O'Connor, fighting at Sidi Barrani, Bardia, Beda Fomm and elsewhere. This offensive was extremely successful, with the Allies suffering very few casualties—around 700 killed and 2,300 wounded and missing—while capturing the strategic port Tobruk, over 100,000 Italian soldiers and most of Cyrenaica. The Germans reacted by despatching the Afrika Korps under Erwin Rommel to shore up the Italian forces. Rommel led a strong counter-offensive in March–April 1941 that forced a general Allied withdrawal towards Egypt. German and Italian forces surrounded Tobruk but failed to take the largely Australian-garrisoned city, leading to the lengthy Siege of Tobruk.

The Rhodesian contingents in the 11th Hussars, Leicesters, Buffs, Argylls, Royal Northumberland Fusiliers, Durham Light Infantry and Sherwood Foresters were transferred en masse to Kenya in February 1941 to join the new Southern Rhodesian Reconnaissance Regiment, which served in East Africa over the following year. The Rhodesians in the 1st Cheshires moved with that regiment to Malta the same month. The Rhodesian Signallers were withdrawn to Cairo to form a section handling high-speed communications between Middle East Command and General Headquarters in England. The 2nd Black Watch, with its Rhodesian contingent, took part in the unsuccessful Allied defence of Crete in May–June 1941, then joined the garrison at Tobruk in August 1941. No. 237 (Rhodesia) Squadron was re-equipped with Hawker Hurricanes the following month.

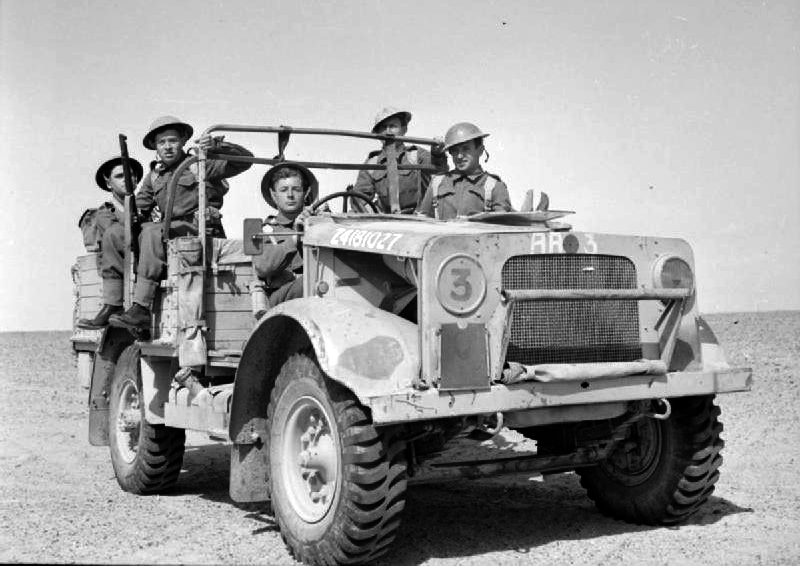
Southern Rhodesians with the King's Royal Rifle Corps in North Africa, 1942

Rhodesians made up an integral component of the Long Range Desert Group (LRDG), a mechanised reconnaissance and raiding unit formed in North Africa in 1940 to operate behind enemy lines. Initially made up of New Zealanders, the unit's first British and Rhodesian members joined in November 1940. It was reorganised several times over the next year as it expanded and by the end of 1941 there were two Rhodesian patrols: S1 and S2 Patrols, B Squadron. Each vehicle bore a Rhodesian place-name starting with "S" on the bonnet, such as "Salisbury" or "Sabi". From April 1941 the LRDG was based at Kufra in south-eastern Libya. The Rhodesians were posted to Bir Harash, about 160 kilometres (99 mi) to the north-east of Kufra, to patrol, hold the Zighen Gap and guard against a possible Axis attack from the north. For the next four months they lived in near-total isolation from the outside world, an exception coming in July 1941 when they and a group of airmen from No. 237 Squadron celebrated Rhodes Day together in the middle of the Cyrenaican desert.

In November 1941 the British Eighth Army, commanded by General Cunningham, launched Operation Crusader in an attempt to relieve Tobruk. The British XXX Corps, led by the 7th Armoured Division ("the Desert Rats") with its Rhodesian platoons, would form the main body of attack, advancing west from Mersa Matruh, then sweeping around in a north-westerly direction towards Tobruk. The XIII Corps would concurrently advance north-west and cut off Axis forces on the coast at Sollum and Bardia. When signalled the Tobruk garrison would break out and move south-east towards the advancing Allied forces. The operation was largely successful for the Allies, and the siege was broken. The Rhodesians of the LRDG took part in raids on Axis rear areas during the operation, ambushing Axis convoys, destroying Axis aircraft and pulling down telegraph poles and wires.

My bloody Rhodesians were often scruffy—but clean—and they were sometimes late for briefings, but they were always swift into action and their gunnery was without equal.

— Brigadier C.E. Lucas-Phillips, reflecting on Rhodesians he commanded in the Western Desert

From late 1941 the LRDG co-operated closely with the newly formed Special Air Service (SAS), which also included some Rhodesians. The Rhodesian LRDG patrols transported and supported SAS troops during operations behind Axis lines. The LRDG also maintained a constant "Road Watch" along the Via Balbia on the north coast of Libya, along which almost all Axis road traffic from Tripoli, the main Libyan port, had to travel east. The LRDG set up a watch post about 8 kilometres (5.0 mi) east of the Italian Marble Arch monument, and teams of two men each recorded Axis vehicle and troop movements in shifts throughout the day and night. This information was relayed back to the British commanders in Cairo.

Rommel advanced east from January 1942, and won a major victory over the Eighth Army, commanded by Lieutenant-General Neil Ritchie, at the Battle of Gazala in May–June 1942. The Axis soon thereafter captured Tobruk. During the Axis victory at the "Retma Box"—part of the British-devised system whereby isolated, strongly fortified "boxes", each manned by a brigade group, formed the front line—and the subsequent Allied retreat, the Southern Rhodesian Anti-Tank Battery lost five men killed, nine wounded and two missing; 37 were captured. Rommel's advance was stalled in July by the Eighth Army, now headed by General Claude Auchinleck, at the First Battle of El Alamein in western Egypt. Two months later the Rhodesians of the LRDG took part in Operation Bigamy (a.k.a. Operation Snowdrop), an unsuccessful attempt by the SAS and LRDG to raid Benghazi harbour. The SAS raiding force, headed by Lieutenant-Colonel David Stirling, was discovered by an Italian reconnaissance unit, prompting Stirling to turn back to Kufra. The Rhodesians, meanwhile, were led into impassable country by a local guide, and swiftly retreated after being attacked by German bombers.

Southern Rhodesian pilots played a part in the siege of Malta during 1942. John Plagis, a Rhodesian airman of Greek ancestry, joined the multinational group of Allied airmen defending the strategically important island in late March and on 1 April achieved four aerial victories in an afternoon, thereby becoming the siege's first Spitfire flying ace. By the time of his withdrawal in July he had been awarded the Distinguished Flying Cross twice. The British finally delivered vital supplies to Malta on 15 August with Operation Pedestal.

Back in Salisbury, the Southern Rhodesian government was coming under pressure from Britain to put its armed forces under the purview of a regional command. Huggins decided in late October 1942 to join a unified Southern African Command headed by South Africa's Jan Smuts. This choice was motivated by a combination of strategic concerns and geopolitical manoeuvring. Apart from considering South Africa a more appropriate partner in geographical, logistical and cultural terms, Huggins feared that the alternative—joining the British East Africa Command—might detract from the autonomous nature of Southern Rhodesia's war effort, with possible constitutional implications. A shift in the deployment of the colony's troops duly occurred. For the rest of the war the majority of Rhodesian servicemen went into the field integrated into South African formations, prominently the 6th Armoured Division.

=== El Alamein ===
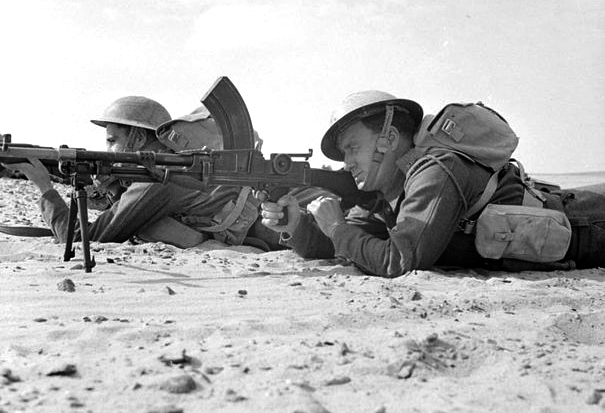
A Rhodesian Bren light machine gun team with the King's Royal Rifle Corps in the Western Desert, 1942

The decisive victory of Lieutenant-General Bernard Montgomery's Eighth Army over the Germans and Italians at the Second Battle of El Alamein in October–November 1942 turned the tide of the North African war strongly in favour of the Allies, and did much to revive Allied morale. The Rhodesians of the KRRC took part in the battle as part of the 7th Armoured Division under the XIII Corps, forming part of the initial thrust in the southern sector.

The Rhodesian Anti-Tank Battery under Major Guy Savory also fought at El Alamein, supporting the Australian 9th Division as part of the XXX Corps. The fighting around "Thompson's Post" between 1 and 3 November was some of the fiercest Rhodesians took part in during the war. Hoping to knock out the Allied anti-tank guns before counter-attacking, the Germans concentrated intense artillery fire on the Australian and Rhodesian guns before advancing 12 Panzer IV tanks towards the weakest point of the Australian line. The Australian six-pounders had been largely disabled by the bombardment but most of the Rhodesian guns remained operational. The Rhodesian gunners disabled two Panzers and seriously damaged two more, compelling an Axis retreat, and held their position until being relieved on 3 November. One Rhodesian officer and seven other ranks were killed and more than double that number were wounded. For his actions at Thompson's Post, Sergeant J A Hotchin received the Distinguished Conduct Medal; Lieutenants R J Bawden and H R C Callon won the Military Cross and Trooper P Vorster the Military Medal.

The KRRC Rhodesians were in the forefront of the Allied column pursuing the retreating Axis forces after El Alamein, advancing through Tobruk, Gazala and Benghazi before reaching El Agheila on 24 November 1942. They patrolled around the Axis right flank until being withdrawn to Timimi in December. Tripoli fell to the Eighth Army on 23 January 1943, and six days later Allied forces reached Tunisia's south-eastern frontier, where Italian and German forces manned the Mareth Line, a series of fortifications built by the French in the 1930s.

=== Tunisia ===
Strategic locations in Tunisia and Algeria

The Mareth Line constituted one of two fronts in the Tunisia Campaign, the second being to the north-west, where the British First Army and American II Corps, firmly established in formerly Vichy-held Morocco and Algeria following Operation Torch in November 1942, were gradually pushing the Axis forces under Hans-Jürgen von Arnim back towards Tunis. After von Arnim won a decisive victory over the Americans at the Battle of Sidi Bou Zid in mid-February 1943, destroying over 100 US tanks, the Eighteenth Army Group was formed under the British General Harold Alexander to co-ordinate the actions of the Allied forces on both Tunisian fronts.

The Eighth Army under Montgomery spent February at Medinine in south-eastern Tunisia. Expecting an imminent attack by the Axis, the Eighth Army mustered every anti-tank gun it could from Egypt and Libya. The 102nd (Northumberland Hussars) Anti-Tank Regiment, including the Rhodesian Anti-Tank Battery under Major Savory, duly advanced west from Benghazi and reached the front on 5 March 1943. The Germans and Italians assaulted Medinine the next day, but failed to make much progress and abandoned their attack by the evening. The Rhodesian gunners, held in reserve, did not take part in the engagement but were attacked from the air. The Rhodesians of the KRRC, now under the 7th Motor Brigade, moved up from Libya during early March. No. 237 (Rhodesia) Squadron, which had spent 1942 and the first months of 1943 in Iran and Iraq, returned to North Africa the same month, with the future Prime Minister Ian Smith in its ranks as a Hurricane pilot.

Montgomery launched his major assault on the Mareth Line, Operation Pugilist, on 16 March. The Rhodesian Anti-Tank Battery, operating with the 50th (Northumbrian) Infantry Division, took part. The Allies advanced at first but the weather and terrain prevented the tanks and guns from moving forward, allowing the 15th Panzer Division to counter-attack successfully. A flanking movement by the 2nd New Zealand Division around the right of the German forces, through the Tebaga Gap, compelled an Axis withdrawal on 27 March. The Rhodesian anti-tank gunners fought their last action in Africa at Enfidaville, 50 kilometres (31 mi) south of Tunis, on 20 April. The KRRC Rhodesians meanwhile took part in a long outflanking march which brought them to El Arousse, 65 kilometres (40 mi) south-west of Tunis, the next day. British armour entered Tunis on 7 May 1943. The Axis forces in North Africa—over 220,000 Germans and Italians, including 26 generals—surrendered a week later.

By time Tunis had fallen, few Rhodesians remained with the First or Eighth Armies; most were transferring to the South African 6th Armoured Division, then in Egypt, or making their way home on leave. Out of the 300 Southern Rhodesians who had joined the KRRC in Egypt, only three officers and 109 other ranks remained at the end of the Tunisian Campaign. The Rhodesian Anti-Tank Battery retraced many of the movements it had taken during the campaign as it returned to Egypt. "Left for Matruh at 0830 hours today," one Rhodesian gunner wrote. "Camped at night on the identical spot where we camped in June 1941. It gave me a queer feeling to look back and think how many of us are missing."

=== Dodecanese ===
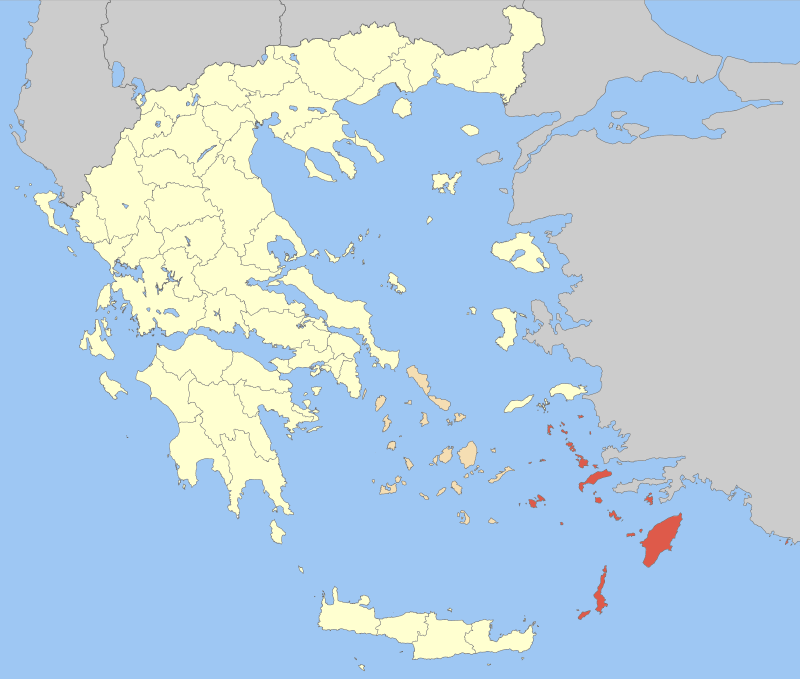
Dodecanese islands in red

Southern Rhodesia was represented in the Dodecanese Campaign of September–November 1943 by the Long Range Desert Group, which was withdrawn from the North African front in March 1943. After retraining for mountain operations in Lebanon, the LRDG moved in late September to the Dodecanese island of Kalymnos, north-west of Kos and south-east of Leros, off the coast of south-west Turkey. In the fall-out from the Armistice of Cassibile between Italy and the Allies, which had been concluded in the first week of September, the Allies were attempting to capture the Dodecanese so the islands could be used as bases against the German-occupied Balkans. Most of the Italian forces had changed sides; the LRDG found itself in an infantry role, acting as a mobile reserve for Italian troops.

The Germans swiftly mobilised to expel the Allied forces and launched heavy air assaults on Kos and Leros. Without fighter support, the islands' defence was soon precarious; the LRDG and the rest of the troops on Kalymnos were withdrawn to Leros on 4 October after the Germans won the Battle of Kos. German air assaults on Leros intensified during late October, and at dawn on 12 November 1943 the Germans attacked Leros by sea and air. During the ensuing Battle of Leros, the LRDG Rhodesians at Point 320, commanded by Rhodesian Captain J R Olivey, spiked their position's guns and withdrew before counter-attacking and retaking the point the next day. They held that position for three more days, during which they learned that the Germans were winning the battle. On 16 November, Olivey decided that holding the point any longer was pointless and ordered his men to split up, escape by any means possible and re-assemble in Cairo. Over half of the unit reached Egypt.

=== Italy ===
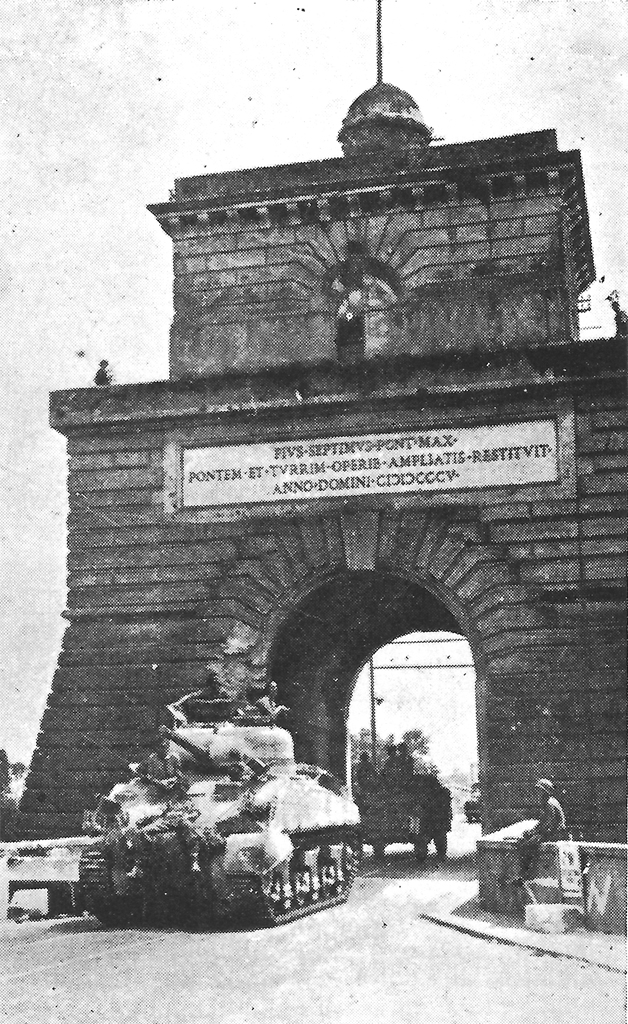
A Rhodesian Sherman tank on the River Tiber in Rome, June 1944

The largest concentration of Southern Rhodesian troops in the Italian Campaign of 1943–45 was the group of about 1,400, mainly from the Southern Rhodesian Reconnaissance Regiment, spread across the South African 6th Armoured Division. The 11th South African Armoured Brigade, one of the 6th Division's two main components, was made up of Prince Alfred's Guard, the Pretoria Regiment (Princess Alice's Own) and the Special Service Battalion, each of which had a Rhodesian squadron of Sherman tanks. The other, the 12th South African Motorised Brigade, comprised infantry—the Witwatersrand Rifles, the Natal Carbineers and the Cape Town Highlanders, the last of which had a large Rhodesian contingent. There were also two Rhodesian artillery batteries—the original Rhodesian Anti-Tank Battery and a newer unit of Rhodesian field gunners. After a year's training in Egypt, the division sailed to Italy in April 1944, landing towards the end of the month at Taranto. No. 237 Squadron, now flying Spitfires, rebased to Corsica the same month to operate over Italy and southern France.

The 6th Division moved north-west from Taranto to take its place as part of the Eighth Army alongside the US Fifth Army. It took part in the fourth and final Allied assault of the Battle of Monte Cassino in the second and third weeks of May 1944, helping to force the Germans out, and thereafter advanced north-west up the Liri valley to join the Allied forces at Anzio and advance onwards to Rome. After wiping out a small German force about 50 km (31 mi) east of the Italian capital on 3 June, the 6th Division advanced north and captured the town of Paliano, then doubled back to the south-west and moved on Rome, which was reached on the morning of 6 June. A Squadron, Pretoria Regiment—that unit's squadron of Rhodesian tanks—entered the city as part of the division's vanguard.

The German commander Albert Kesselring fought a stubborn delaying action, gradually withdrawing his armies north with three Allied columns in pursuit, the 6th Armoured Division leading the most westerly spearhead of the Eighth Army in the centre. The mountainous terrain and the effective use of anti-tank weapons by the retreating Germans made the Allies' superiority in armour less decisive and slowed the Allied advance north to the banks of the Arno between June and August 1944, during which time the Rhodesian tank squadrons took part in Allied victories at Castellana, Bagnoregio and Chiusi.

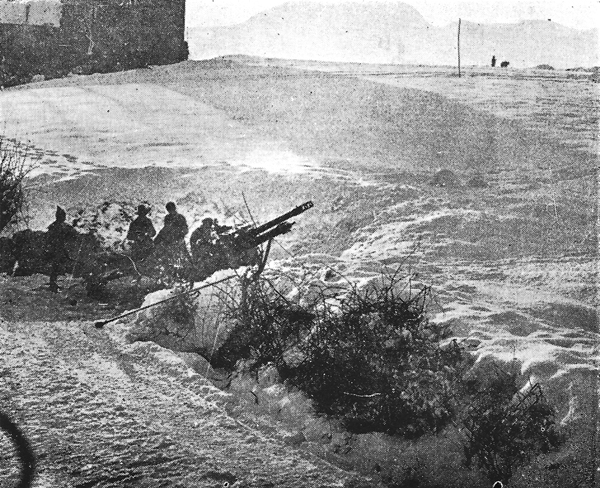
A Rhodesian 25-pounder gun in action at Ripoli, late 1944

By the end of August 1944 the German forces in Italy had formed the Gothic Line along the Apennine Mountains, and the 6th Division had come under the command of the US Fifth Army. The difficulty of using tanks in the mountains led to the Rhodesians of Prince Alfred's Guard temporarily adopting an infantry role, using dismounted tank machine-guns to support the Natal Carabineers during the fighting for Pistoia during early September. The Southern Rhodesian Anti-Tank Battery meanwhile converted partially from guns to 4.2-inch mortars. The South Africans and Rhodesians met with fierce resistance from the 16th SS Panzer Grenadier Division, but helped push the Germans northwards towards the Reno river.

Hoping to repel Allied advances towards Bologna, the Germans took up positions on Monte Stanco overlooking the main roads towards the city. Two Allied assaults on the mountain—one by an Indian battalion, the other by the Royal Natal Carabineers—were repulsed. A third, larger attack at dawn on 13 October provided the Rhodesian Company of the Cape Town Highlanders with some of the fiercest combat they encountered in Italy. Advancing up the slope on the Allied right flank while being fired on from two directions, they suffered heavy casualties but achieved their objective and held it. Both Rhodesian artillery batteries provided support during the assault.

When the line stabilised in November 1944, the portion occupied by the 6th Armoured Division extended for 16 kilometres (9.9 mi) along the heights over the Reno River. The Rhodesians of the Cape Town Highlanders patrolled nightly around the village of Casigno for the next three months. Some of the tank crews, including the Rhodesians of the Special Service Battalion, were temporarily reassigned to infantry duties to assist in these patrols. Many of the Rhodesians had never seen snow before, but on the whole they adapted well, taking up winter sports such as skiing during time off duty. The Rhodesians of the Special Service Battalion received new, more heavily armed tanks in November–December 1944. In February 1945 the 6th Division was relieved by the American 1st Armoured Division and moved to Lucca, 15 kilometres (9.3 mi) north of Pisa, for rest and reorganisation. The Rhodesian Anti-Tank Battery was refitted with M10 tank destroyers. The Spitfires of No. 237 Squadron, meanwhile, took part in assaults on German transport in the Po Valley around Parma and Modena.

=== Balkans and Greece ===
After the Battle of Leros, New Zealand withdrew its squadron from the Long Range Desert Group, compelling the LRDG to reorganise itself into two squadrons of eight patrols each. A Squadron was composed of Rhodesians and B Squadron comprised British troops and a squadron of signallers; around 80 of the officers and men were from Southern Rhodesia. The group was reassigned from the Middle East Command to the Central Mediterranean Force in early 1944, and deployed to the Gargano peninsula in south-eastern Italy, where a new LRDG headquarters was set up near the seaside town of Rodi. Britain hoped to compel the Germans to commit as many divisions as possible to south-eastern Europe so they could not be used on the more important fronts closer to Germany. In June 1944 the LRDG was assigned to operate on the coast of Yugoslavia, with orders to set up observation posts, report the movements of German ships and undertake minor raids.

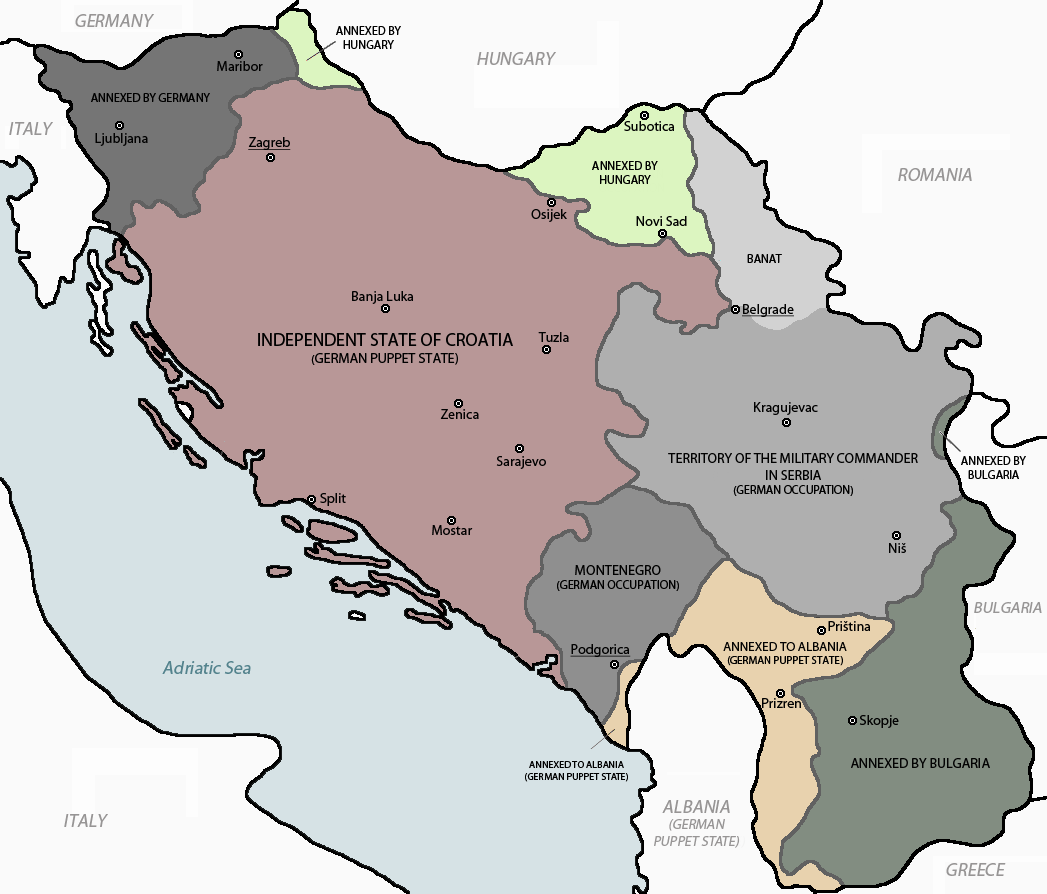
Yugoslavia partitioned under Axis occupation, 1943–44

The successes of Josip Broz Tito's Yugoslav partisans in Dalmatia led the Allies to despatch small patrols into Yugoslavia and Albania to contact partisan leaders and arrange co-operation with the Allied air forces. Several Rhodesian patrols from the LRDG were selected to undertake such missions during August and September 1944. Yugoslav partisans subsequently indicated targets for Allied bombing missions, with some success. From September, members of the LRDG's Rhodesian squadron under Captain Olivey undertook advanced reconnaissance in the Peloponnese peninsula of southern Greece. Landing at Katakolo, they made their way inland to Corinth and, along with the British 4th Parachute Battalion, entered Athens as the Germans departed in November. The Rhodesians of the LRDG spent November and December helping Greek forces to garrison an Athens orphanage against supporters of the communist Greek People's Liberation Army. Four Rhodesians were killed.

The LRDG returned to Yugoslavia in February 1945, operating around Istria and Dalmatia, where Germany still held portions of the mainland and certain strategic islands. The Germans had heavily mined the southern Adriatic and were attempting to cover their shipping by moving only by night, close to shore, and heaving to during the day under camouflage nets. The LRDG was tasked to patrol the coast, find the ships and report their locations to the air force for bombing. This it did with success. It remained in Yugoslavia for the rest of the war.

The heightened vigilance of the German garrison as the war entered its final phase made these operations especially hazardous, particularly as they were often attempted at extremely close quarters. On several occasions Rhodesian patrols only narrowly escaped discovery. During one action, two Rhodesian patrols catered for the possibility that Germans might be listening to their transmissions by communicating in Shona, an African language. The LRDG's last actions of the war, in April and May 1945, were to help Tito's partisans capture German-held islands off Dalmatia.

=== Spring 1945 offensive in Italy ===
Kesselring's forces in Italy retained their formidable defensive positions in the northern Apennines in March 1945. The 6th Division rejoined the line in early April, shortly before the Allies launched their spring 1945 offensive, Operation Grapeshot. The units including Rhodesians took up positions opposite Monte Sole, Monte Abelle and Monte Caprara. The Rhodesian 25-pounder guns were posted slightly forward of their former positions, and B (Rhodesia) Squadron, Prince Alfred's Guard, moved to Grizzana. The Special Service Battalion provided armoured support to the 13th South African Motorised Brigade.

The South Africans and Rhodesians launched a two-pronged assault on the German positions over the road to Bologna at 22:30 on 15 April 1945. The Cape Town Highlanders' advance up the steep cliffs of Monte Sole was obstructed by a German minefield that guarded the peak. The Rhodesian officer commanding the leading platoon, Second Lieutenant G B Mollett, took a section of men and dashed through the minefield to the summit; for this he later received the Distinguished Service Order. Hand-to-hand fighting on Monte Sole continued until dawn, when the Germans withdrew. The Witwatersrand Rifles meanwhile took Monte Caprara. The Cape Town Highlanders took Monte Abelle late on 16 April, advancing under heavy artillery fire to the summit before clearing it of Germans. The regiment lost 31 killed and 76 wounded during these actions, including three Rhodesians killed and three wounded.

This victory contributed to a general Allied breakthrough in the area, and by 19 April, the 6th Division's armour was moving towards Lombardy and Venetia as part of the Fifth Army's vanguard. American and Polish troops entered Bologna on 21 April. The South Africans and Rhodesians advanced north-west towards the Panaro river. The Special Service Battalion's Rhodesian squadron, moving forward alongside the Cape Town Highlanders, and the Rhodesians of Prince Alfred's Guard took part in numerous engagements with the retreating German rearguard, and suffered several fatalities.

The 6th Division crossed the Po near Ostiglia on 25 April and, after resupplying for a week, began a speedy advance towards Venice, aiming to cut off the retreat of elements of the German Fourteenth Army. The South Africans and Rhodesians advanced through Nogara and Cerea, crossed the Adige early on 29 April, and then made for Treviso, 19 kilometres (12 mi) north of Venice. The retreating German forces were by this time in such disarray that, during its advance from the Po, the 11th South African Armoured Brigade took prisoners from eight German divisions. On 30 April, the 6th Division joined up with British and American forces south of Treviso, and cut off the Germans' last escape route from Italy.

The German forces in Italy surrendered unconditionally on 2 May 1945, while the 6th Division was moving north-west; at the time of the announcement it was near Milan. Twelve days later the 6th Division held a victory parade of its 1,200 guns, tanks and other vehicles at Monza racetrack, 16 kilometres (9.9 mi) north of Milan. The Rhodesians separated from their vehicles after the parade, then spent May and June 1945 as occupation troops in Lombardy before returning home.

== Britain, Norway and western Europe ==
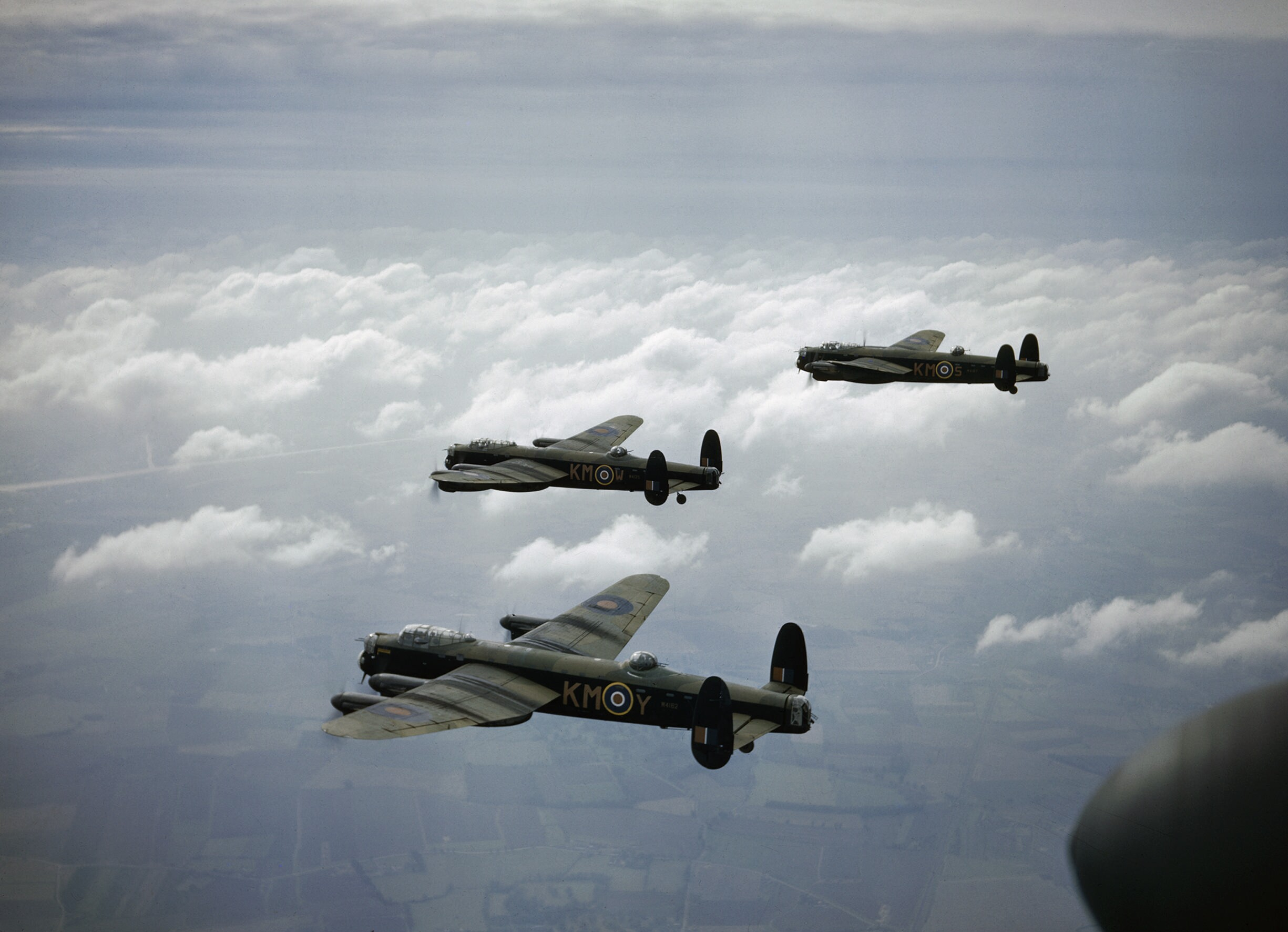
Lancaster bombers of No. 44 (Rhodesia) Squadron, based on the east coast of England, September 1942

Southern Rhodesia's fighting contributions in Britain and western Europe were primarily in the air, as part of the much larger Allied forces. Rhodesian pilots and Allied airmen trained in the colony's flying schools participated in the defence of Britain throughout the war, as well as in the strategic bombing of Germany and other operations. Rhodesia provided the only RAF flying ace of the Norwegian Campaign of April–June 1940, Squadron Leader Caesar Hull. Later that year "The Few", the Allied airmen of the Battle of Britain, included three pilots of Southern Rhodesian birth—Hull, Pilot Officer John Chomley and Flight Lieutenant John Holderness—of whom two, Hull and Chomley, lost their lives. (Note: Hull was shot down and killed during a dogfight over south London on 7 September 1940. Chomley went missing in action over the English Channel on 12 August 1940 and was never found.)

Two of the RAF's three Rhodesian squadrons, Nos. 44 and 266, operated from England during the war. No. 266 (Rhodesia) Squadron, a fighter squadron based in Cambridgeshire for most of the duration, was initially only nominally Rhodesian, being manned by a mixture of British and Commonwealth personnel, but it received more airmen from the colony gradually and was virtually all Rhodesian by August 1941. Initially flying Spitfires, it switched to Typhoons in early 1942. It took as its motto the Sindebele word Hlabezulu ("Stabber of Skies") and first went into action over Dunkirk on 2 June 1940, after which it fought in the Battle of Britain. The squadron's duties thereafter included patrolling, protecting convoys, sweeping around northern France and the Belgian and Dutch coasts, and escorting bombing raids over France and the Rhine.

No. 44 (Rhodesia) Squadron, based in Lincolnshire on the east coast, was a heavy bomber unit, and part of No. 5 Group in RAF Bomber Command's front line. Unlike the other two squadrons designated as "Rhodesian", No. 44 Squadron never had a Rhodesian majority, despite efforts to so populate it. Initially equipped with Hampdens, it became the first RAF squadron to convert to Lancasters at the end of 1941. It played a prominent part in the attack on the MAN diesel factory at Augsburg in April 1942. In March 1943 No. 44 Squadron took part in the Allied bombing of cities in northern Italy, including Genoa and Milan, as well as targets in Germany such as Wilhelmshaven, Cologne and Berlin.

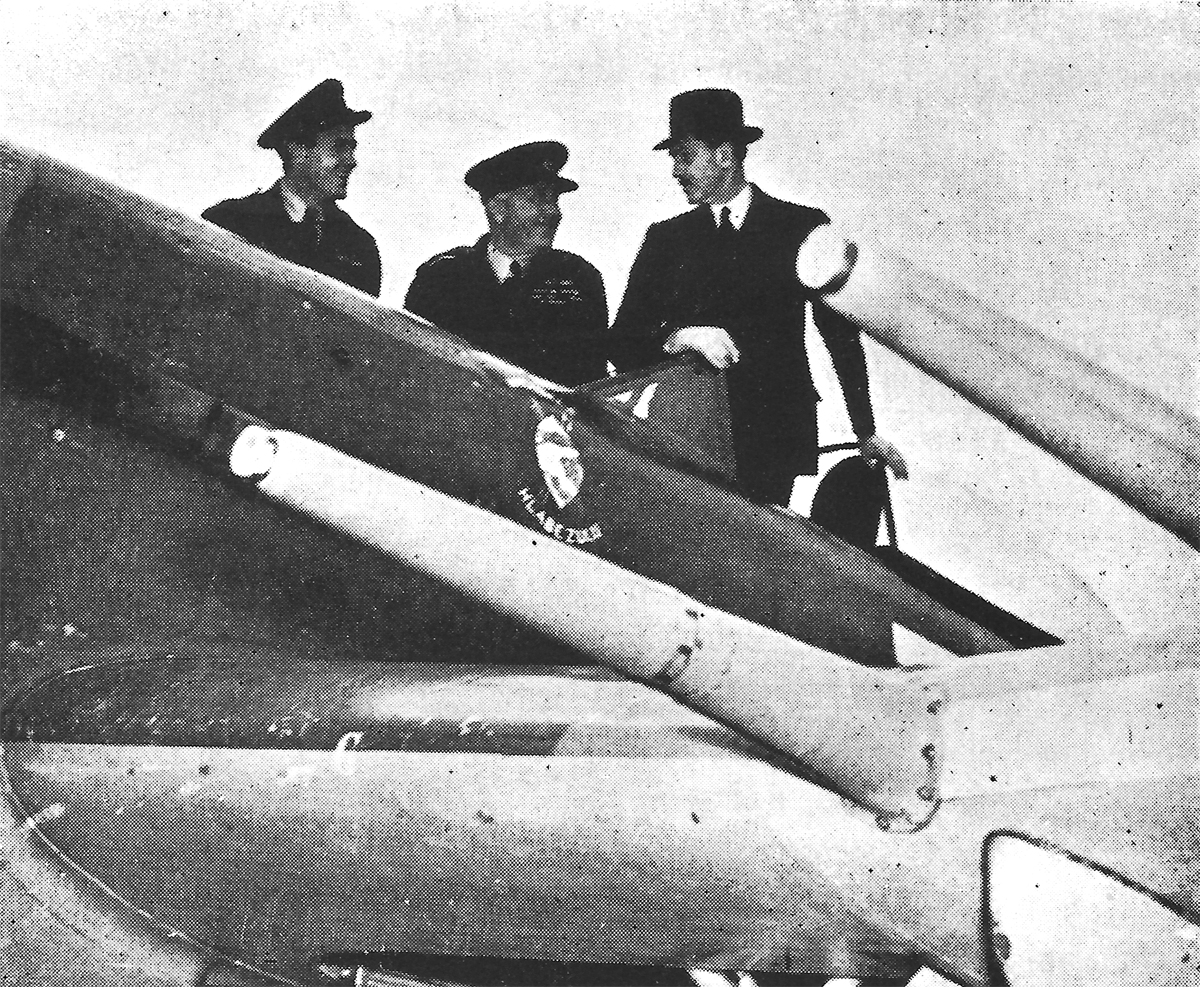
Huggins (right) inspecting a Typhoon of No. 266 (Rhodesia) Squadron in England, 1944

From early 1944, No. 266 Squadron took part in ground attack operations over the Channel and northern France, operating from RAF Harrowbeer in Devon. The squadron also escorted Allied bombers embarking on or returning from raids, protecting them from German fighters. Larger petrol tanks were fitted to the Typhoons to increase their range. In May 1944 the squadron was visited by the Prime Minister, who had been knighted and was now Sir Godfrey Huggins. Over the next month, in preparation for the imminent Allied invasion of Normandy, the Rhodesian aircraft took on a fighter-bomber role, flying sorties across the channel twice a day and participating in the bombing of bridges, roads, railways and the like.

Apart from the Southern Rhodesian airmen serving with the RAF in Britain, the colony was sparsely represented in the Normandy landings of 6 June 1944 ("D-Day"). Several men from the colony served aboard cruisers and destroyers that engaged the German shore batteries. A small number of Southern Rhodesians parachuted into Normandy with the 6th Airborne Division during Operation Tonga, and some took part in the amphibious landings. No. 266 Squadron was part of the Allied force that flew over the beaches during the first landings, supporting the infantry. Later that day it took part in sorties to assist the paratroopers holding the bridgeheads north of Caen.

No. 266 Squadron, which remained 95% Rhodesian at the start of 1945, thereafter provided air support to the advancing Allied armies through France, the Low Countries and finally Germany. Through most of the European winter months it was based in Antwerp. In late March 1945 the Rhodesian fighters formed part of the force tasked with protecting the descending Allied paratroopers during Field-Marshal Montgomery's crossing of the Rhine. During April the squadron operated over Hanover and the northern Netherlands. No. 44 Squadron, meanwhile, embarked on bombing raids on targets as far away as Gdynia and Königsberg in East Prussia, as well as towns and cities closer to Berlin such as Dresden, Emden and Leipzig. Its last bombing operation was a raid on the Berghof, Hitler's residence, near Berchtesgaden in Bavaria on 25 April 1945. After Germany surrendered on 7 May, ending the war in Europe, No. 44 Squadron was one of many units selected to evacuate British prisoners of war home from the continent.

== Burma ==
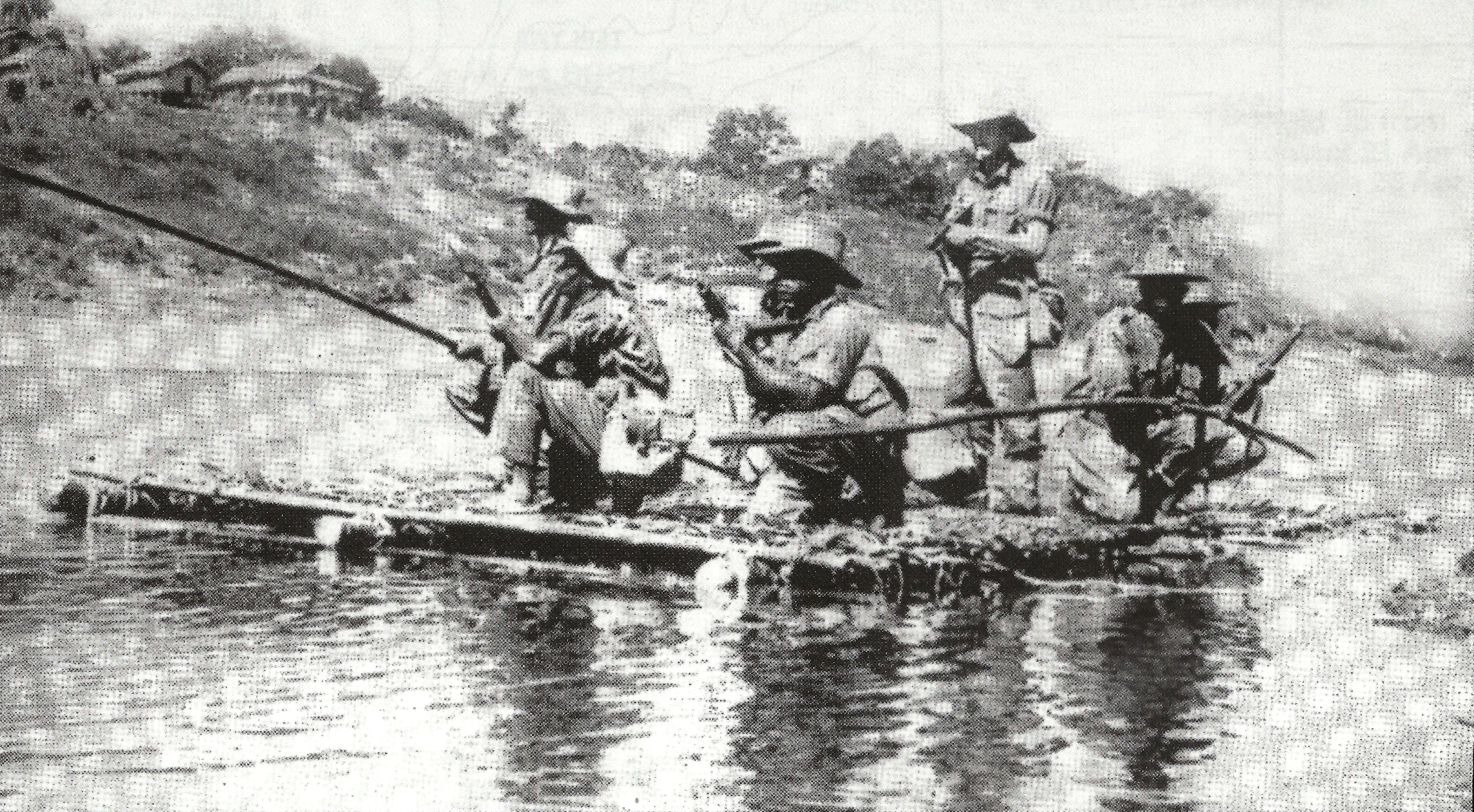
A Rhodesian African Rifles river patrol in Burma, 1945

Southern Rhodesia's main contribution to the Burma Campaign in terms of manpower was made by the Rhodesian African Rifles (RAR), a regiment of black troops led by white officers that joined the front at the end of 1944. The colony also made a significant contribution to the Commonwealth forces' command element in Burma, providing white officers and NCOs to the 81st (West Africa), 82nd (West Africa) and 11th (East Africa) Divisions, made up of units from Nigeria, the Gold Coast, the Gambia, Sierra Leone, Kenya, Uganda, Tanganyika, Nyasaland, Northern Rhodesia and the Congo. Almost every African battalion in Burma had white Rhodesian officers and NCOs attached; some were over 70% Rhodesian-led.

Modelled on the Rhodesia Native Regiment of World War I, the RAR was formed in May 1940 under the command of Lieutenant-Colonel F J Wane, who the black soldiers nicknamed msoro-we-gomo ("top of the mountain"). Most volunteers for the regiment came from Mashonaland, much to the surprise of the white recruiters, who had expected Matabeleland, with stronger martial traditions, to provide more men. (Note: Of the 8,200 black men who enlisted in the RAR between 1940 and 1945, more than half were later judged medically unfit and discharged. Many recruits were from neighbouring countries.) Originally comprising one battalion, the RAR expanded to two battalions in late 1943 to accommodate a rush of new recruits following the news that the 1st Battalion was being deployed overseas. Steps to organise two further battalions of black Southern Rhodesians were abandoned because of the conviction of the colony's overall military commander, Brigadier E R Day, that it was important "to preserve a fair balance" between black and white troops, and that raising the men would take too long in any case. (Note: Black recruitment was generally slow for a variety of reasons, prominently because black men would usually earn far higher wages in civilian occupations than as soldiers. Political opposition to helping the colonial system also played a part.)

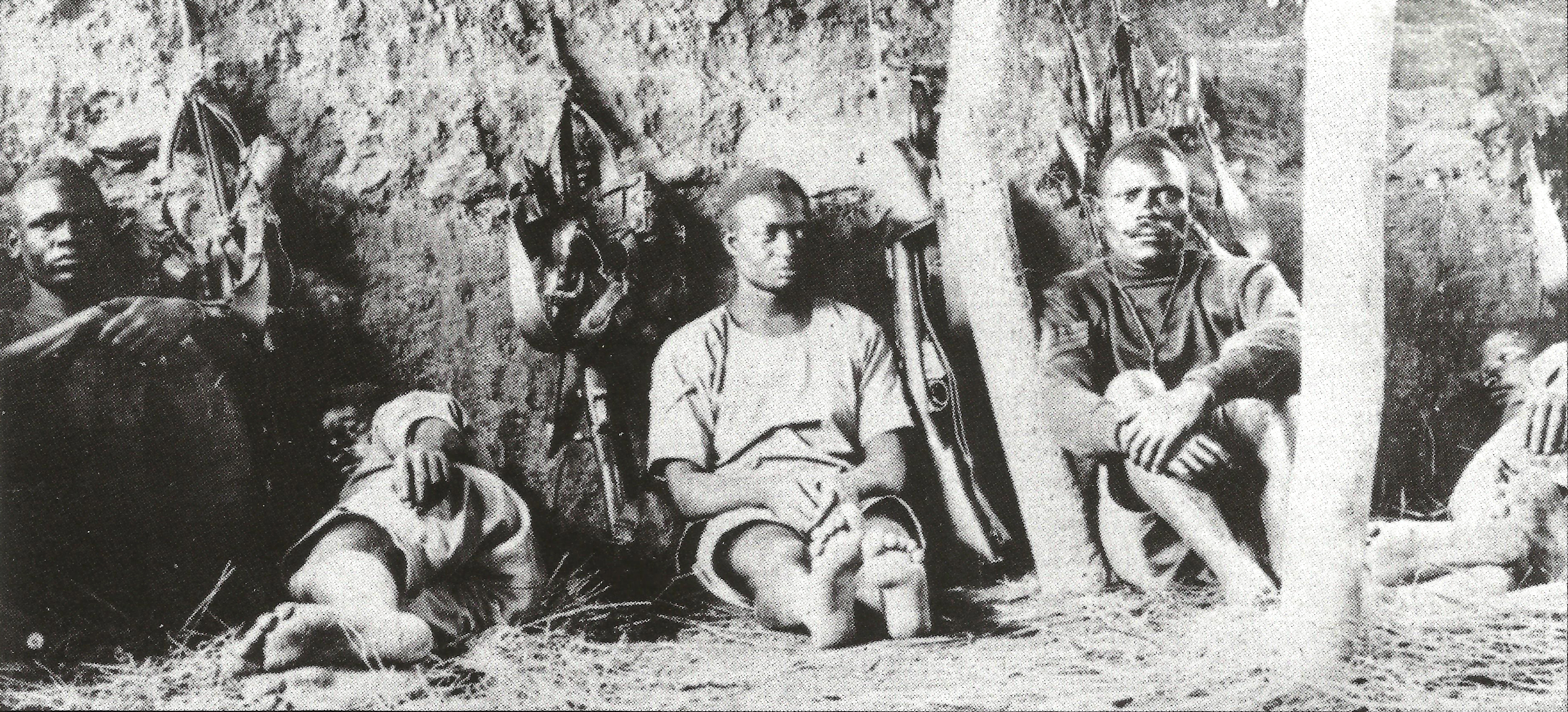
1RAR troops in Burma, resting in a dugout

1RAR trained in Kenya from December 1943 to September 1944, when it transferred to Ceylon and became part of the 22nd (East Africa) Infantry Brigade alongside the 1st KAR and the 3rd Northern Rhodesia Regiment. In December 1944, after three months' training for jungle warfare, 1RAR and the other two components of the brigade joined the Burma Campaign at Chittagong under the command of the 15th Indian Corps. The brigade spent about three months supporting the 25th Indian Division in north-western Burma, advancing through the Mayu peninsula during January 1945 and taking part in the latter stages of the Battle of Ramree Island, landing on the island on 14 February. 1RAR fortified positions at Myinbin, Kyaukkale and Mayin but did not contact Japanese forces.

A widespread belief developed among Japanese troops in Burma that the British Army's African soldiers were cannibals, partly because of deliberate disinformation spread by the black troops themselves as they travelled around the country. While entirely unfounded, the notion "that we Africans eat people", as one RAR soldier put it, had a fearsome psychological effect; men of 1RAR reported Japanese soldiers picking up their comrades' bodies in the midst of battle and running away.

In March 1945 the 22nd Brigade was ordered south to Dalaba where it became part of the 82nd (West Africa) Division, which had been tasked with clearing the Taungup area of Japanese troops. The 22nd Brigade was deployed as a flank guard, sweeping down the Tanlwe Chaung before hooking around to the Taungup Chaung and ultimately the road to Prome; this move was intended to cut Japanese units to the north off from the Irrawaddy Delta to the south, where most of the key battles were being fought. 1RAR patrolled the area during March and April 1945 and was involved in several contacts. On 20 April it assembled at a point overlooking Tanlwe Chaung, where it was shelled by Japanese artillery and mortars dug in atop two high features to the south. On the morning of 26 April, after a few days of patrols, 1RAR took the lead in what became the Battle of Tanlwe Chaung; after about half an hour of bombing, strafing and artillery bombardment of the Japanese positions, elements of A and D Companies, 1RAR charged up the slopes and routed much of the Japanese garrison before taking both hills. Seven RAR men were killed in the action and 22 were wounded, mostly from D Company; an officer was also injured. (Note: The anniversary of the Battle of Tanlwe Chaung, seen by the RAR as its great success of the war, was celebrated by the regiment each year until its dissolution in 1981.) An officer of the RAR recalled the battles of April 1945 around Taungup and Tanlwe Chaung as extremely intense:

The way our fellows charged their way along these paths, yelling, makes a lump come into my throat when I think of it even now. It was sheer suicide for the leading group and the whole force faced machine guns up the sides of the slopes above them, on the sides of the features behind them, and even up the trees above them, with snipers behind who let them pass before opening fire. For sheer cold-blooded bravery, I can't believe it has ever been beaten in any other theatre of war; and this went on for three weeks solid.

1RAR spent most of May 1945 building quarters and training before marching the 110 km (68 mi) to Prome in late June; from here they went another 25 km (16 mi) by truck to Gyobingauk. The monsoon conditions took a dreadful toll on operations, making logistics particularly difficult and slow—men found themselves either found themselves knee-deep in mud or slipping around on the surface. From early July 1945 1RAR patrolled around Gyobingauk, repeatedly engaging parties of Japanese and forcing them into the hills. Even after the Japanese commanders in Burma surrendered unconditionally, the Allied troops had to continue patrolling to handle Japanese stragglers who either did know of this or did not believe it. After the Japanese forces in South-East Asia formally surrendered at Singapore on 12 September 1945, active Allied operations in the region were greatly diminished. 1RAR spent about half a year guarding Japanese prisoners in Burma before leaving for home in March 1946. They arrived back in Salisbury on 10 May.

== Southern Rhodesians in other theatres ==
In addition to the main deployments, Southern Rhodesian servicemen served in other theatres of the war. Rhodesian sailors in the Royal, South African and Merchant Navies crewed ships in many parts of the world, including the Indian Ocean, the Arctic and the Pacific. No. 237 (Rhodesia) Squadron operated in Iran and Iraq in 1942–43, guarding oil wells and pipelines and supporting the British Tenth Army.

Closer to home, Southern Rhodesian military surveyors contributed to the preliminary planning work for the Allied invasion of Madagascar in May 1942, and landed at Diego Suarez with the invading forces. They remained there long after the Vichy French garrison agreed to an armistice at Ambalavao on 6 November 1942—the last Rhodesian left the island in October 1943.

== Home front ==
=== Rhodesian Air Training Group ===
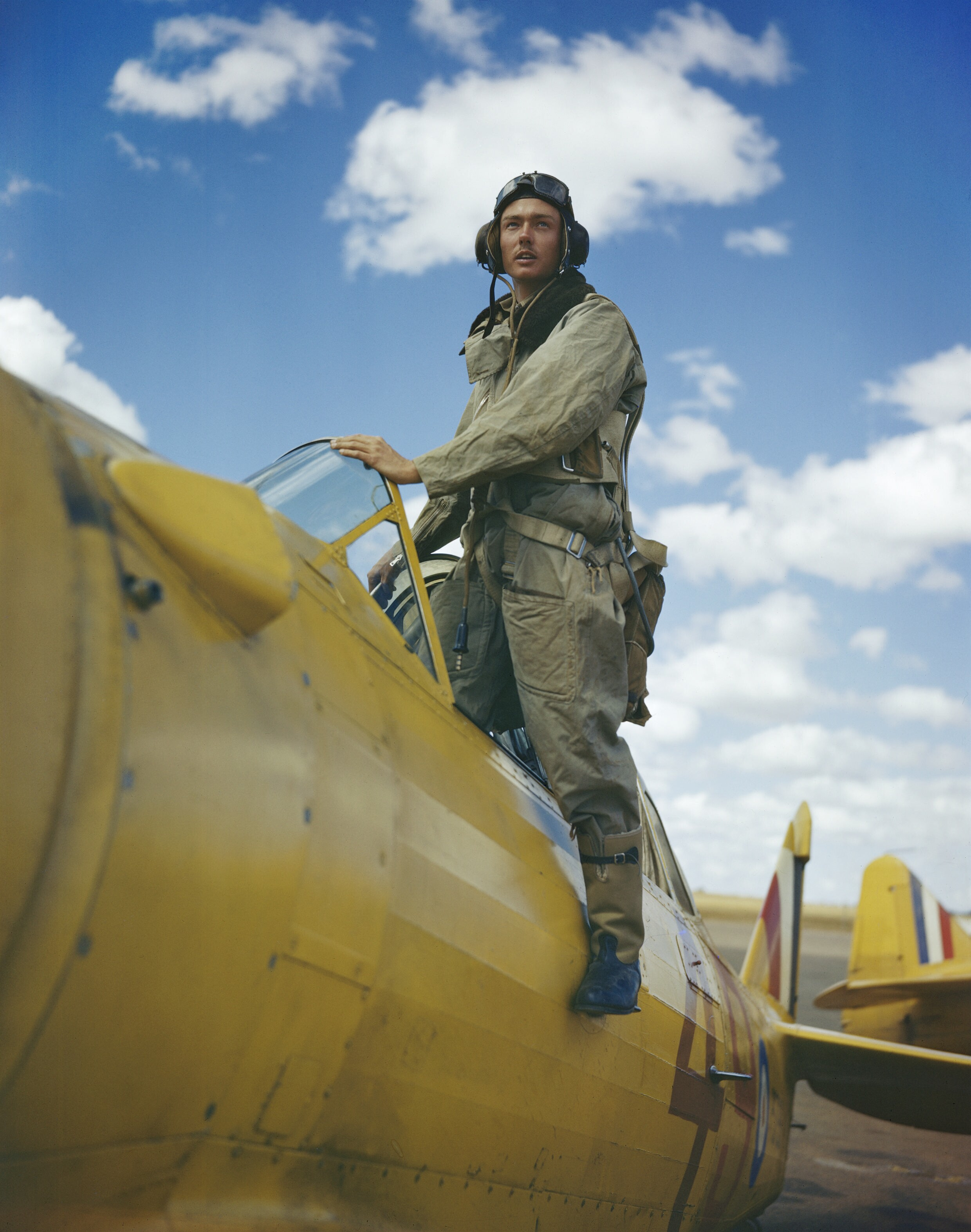
A trainee pilot climbing into a Harvard at No. 20 Service Flying Training School near Salisbury, 1943

The colony's participation in the Empire Air Training Scheme is described in J F MacDonald's War History of Southern Rhodesia as "undoubtedly Southern Rhodesia's greatest single contribution to the Allied victory", an assertion corroborated by Robert Blake in his 1977 History of Rhodesia. The Rhodesian Air Training Group (RATG) under Air Vice-Marshal Sir C W Meredith eventually operated 11 aerodromes, requiring a huge national effort to build, maintain and staff—at the scheme's peak more than a fifth of the white population was involved. This judicious management of skills and resources allowed the territory to make a much larger contribution to the Allied war effort than if it had simply sent all its manpower into the field.

Southern Rhodesia was regarded as an ideal location for air training for a number of reasons. It was far from the hostilities, firmly pro-British and had excellent weather throughout the year. The British Air Ministry resolved to outsource training to the colony amid some urgency in late 1939 after EATS took a long time to get going in Canada. The RATG was the last EATS group to be formed, but the first to start training airmen; it also turned out fully qualified pilots before any of the others, doing so for the first time in November 1940.

The programme originally called only for an initial training wing and six schools, but this was expanded to eight flying schools and a school for bomb aimers, navigators and air gunners. There were two air firing and bombing ranges. Six reserve landing grounds were constructed for landing and take-off instruction to prevent congestion on the main airstrips. Later in the war, a dedicated air station was designated for the training of instructors. Small administrative units were established in South Africa at Cape Town, Durban and Port Elizabeth to handle incoming equipment and arrivals and departures of personnel.

The complete pilot's course initially lasted six months, split into two months each of elementary, intermediate and advanced instruction. Ground subjects were also taught and each trainee had to fly at least 150 hours to qualify. By the end of the war each period had been shortened by a week to speed up the output of trained pilots.

The trainees were mostly British, but came from all over the world. "The diversity of nationalities under training was surprising and impressive," reported one officer. "British, South African, New Zealand, Australian, Canadian, American, men from Yugoslavia, Greece, Free France, Poland, Czechoslovakia, Kenya, Uganda, Tanganyika, Fiji Isles, Malta." "[Southern Rhodesia's] part in the Commonwealth Air Training Scheme has been outstandingly fine," Sir James Ross of the British Air Ministry reported in 1942. "I say this from knowledge and without qualification. ... I know how gratefully the Air Staff in London reckon on the unfailingly regular flow of well-trained pilots and observers, course after course, month after month."

=== Home service ===
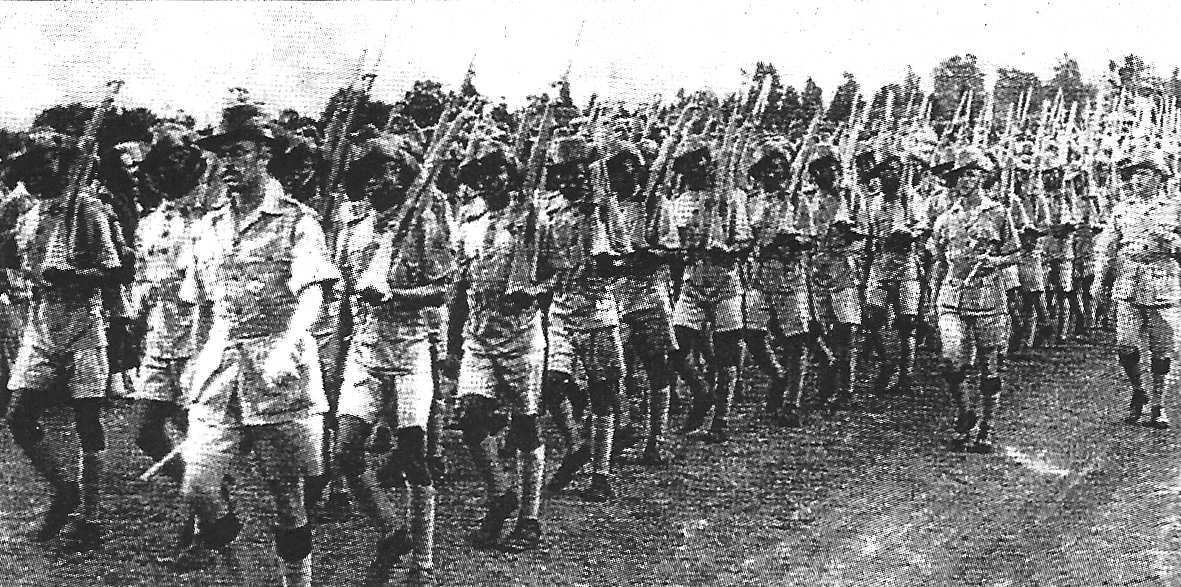
The 1st Battalion, RAR parades in Salisbury for Armistice Day, 1941

The Rhodesian African Rifles were based at Borrowdale in north-east Salisbury between 1940 and 1943. Apart from a contingent sent south to Durban to guard Italian prisoners on their way to Rhodesia, the regiment's main role was garrison duties within the colony. The Rhodesian Air Askari Corps, a unit of black volunteer troops under white command, guarded the air bases and also provided manpower for non-armed labour. (Note: Askari (plural askaris) was a term commonly used by colonial armies of the time to refer to indigenous soldiers.) The perceived possibility that Japan might attempt an invasion of southern Africa via Madagascar led to the consolidation of a few hundred rural whites into the Southern Rhodesia Commando, a part-time cadre intended as the basis for a guerrilla-style resistance movement, from 1942.

The mobilisation of white British South Africa Police officers for military service led to black male and white female constables taking on higher responsibilities. (Note: The BSAP first recruited black policewomen in 1965.) The BSAP recruited more black patrolmen to accommodate the growth of the urban black population during the war, going from 1,067 black and 547 white personnel in 1937 to 1,572 blacks and 401 whites in 1945. This "Africanisation" led to higher appreciation for black constables among senior policemen and the public. The police remained rigidly segregated, but black constables received uniforms more similar to those of their white counterparts, and the nominal distinction between the BSAP "proper" and the British South Africa Native Police—the "force within the force" black personnel were traditionally regarded as members of—was abolished.

==== Women ====
White Southern Rhodesian women served in the war with auxiliary female units, in far greater numbers than in World War I. The Southern Rhodesian government set up the Women's Auxilitary Volunteers (WAV), the Women's Auxiliary Air Service (WAAS), the Women's Auxiliary Military Service (WAMS) and the Women's Auxiliary Police Service (WAPS). Most Southern Rhodesian servicewomen served domestically within these organisations, while some went to East Africa with the First Aid Nursing Yeomanry.

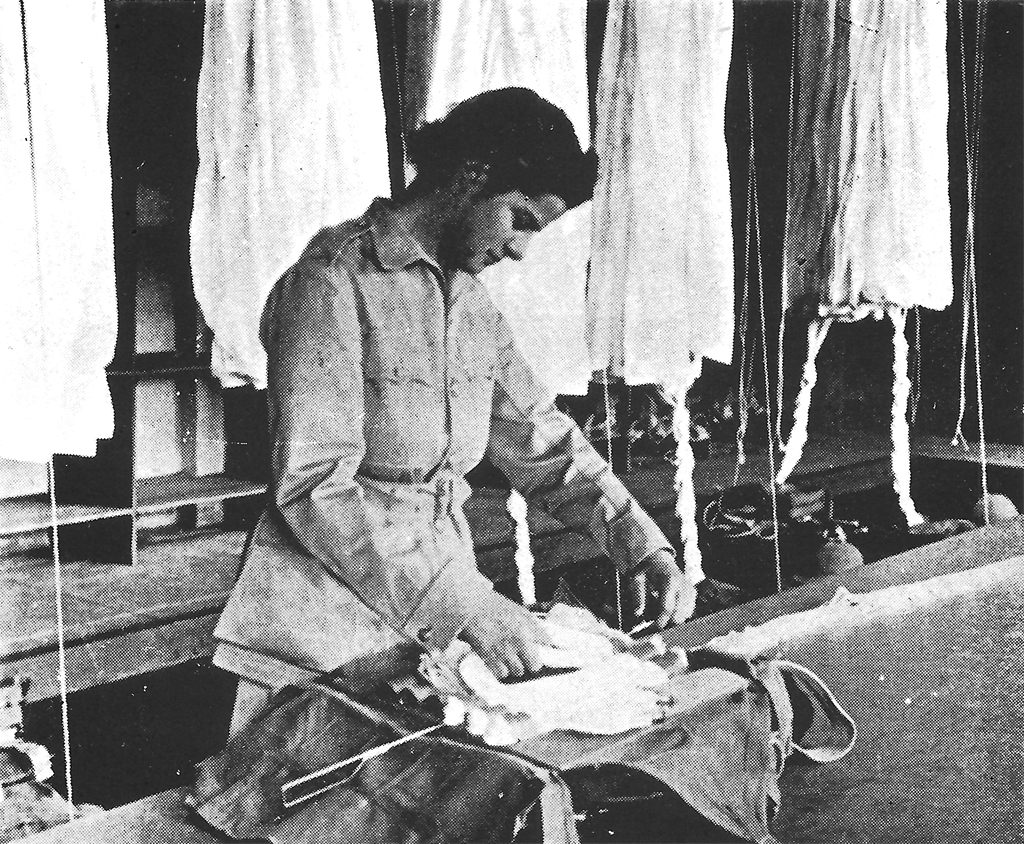
A Rhodesian servicewoman folding and packing a parachute

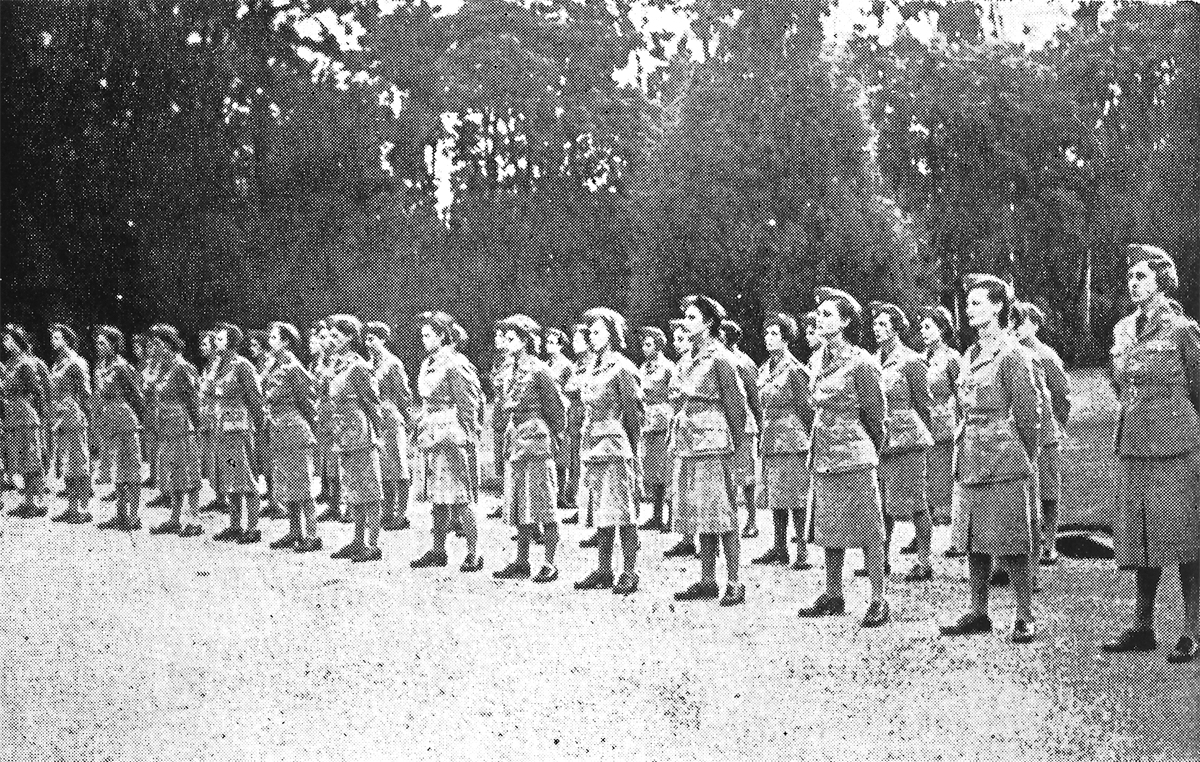
The Rhodesian Women's Military Auxiliary Service on parade in Salisbury in December 1941

The WAV, run by the Ministry of Defence, recruited and trained female personnel for the WAAS and the WAMS, which respectively came under the Air and Defence Ministries. According to the official statement announcing their formation, the services' purpose was "to substitute women for men wherever necessary and practicable throughout the military and air forces within Southern Rhodesia."

Recruitment for the women's services began in June 1941. Most volunteers were married women, many of them the wives of military men. The air and military services both offered a wide variety of positions. In addition to jobs as typists, clerks, caterers and the like, women served as drivers and in the stores and workshops. Many of the women in the air service did skilled work, checking flying instruments, testing parts and doing minor repairs. The women of the Auxiliary Police Service served as BSAP officers both in stations and on the streets.

Members of Southern Rhodesia's white female population who did not join the forces still contributed to the war in various ways. Women worked in munitions factories and engineering workshops in Salisbury and Bulawayo. The Women's National Service League, which thousands of women joined before the war even started, revived the role white Rhodesian women had played in World War I, sending the colony's servicemen overseas parcels containing warm clothes, newspapers, razor blades, soap, food and minor luxuries such as sweets, tobacco and novels. Efforts such as these did much to keep the troops' morale up.

=== Domestic politics ===
On the outbreak of war, Huggins invited the leader of the opposition Labour Party, Harry Davies, to join a coalition government. Davies accepted without consulting his party caucus, much to the indignation of many of his contemporaries; Labour promptly split. The two Labour factions reconciled in 1943 and briefly threatened Huggins's premiership until a heated dispute over whether Labour should become multiracial led to the party's disintegration in 1944.

=== Economic impact; conscripted labour ===
The enemy wants you to slacken off ... You have a responsibility ... Southern Rhodesia's war effort may be small in comparison with that of Russia, Britain, the United States and the big dominions, but its value is none the less real.

— Extract from an Office of Information newsletter, late 1943

The Southern Rhodesian economy grew considerably during the war despite the concurrent rise of war expenditure to pay for the expansion of the military and the air training scheme. Expenditure on the war grew from £1,793,367 in the financial year 1940–41 to £5,334,701 in 1943–44—total Southern Rhodesian expenditure on the air training scheme was £11,215,522. (Note: This refers only to Southern Rhodesian government expenditure. Financial responsibility for the air training project was split with the Air Ministry in London—the colony met building and maintenance costs, paid Southern Rhodesian personnel and contributed £800,000 to the operating costs. The British government covered other costs.) These sums, while tiny compared to those incurred by larger nations, were enormous when scaled against the white population of less than 70,000 that accounted for most of the colony's economic output. Annual costs for the air training scheme alone far exceeded the pre-war national budget.

Southern Rhodesia was then the second largest gold producer in the world, after South Africa. The colony's gold output had expanded greatly during the 1930s, and it remained the territory's main source of income during the war, though many extracting operations were diverted towards strategic minerals, most prominently chrome and asbestos. Southern Rhodesia became one of the two main sources of chrome for the Allies (South Africa was the other) and the world's third largest producer of asbestos after Canada and the Soviet Union. By the end of the war the mines at Shabani and Mashaba were turning out 1.5 million tonnes of asbestos a year, in addition to 600,000 tonnes of chrome. Gold output reached peak levels in 1941–42 and thereafter subsided. Southern Rhodesia also exported tungsten, mica and tin, and provided coal for the copper mines of Northern Rhodesia and the Congo. The Southern Rhodesian government encouraged private enterprise to form secondary industries to exploit the colony's natural resources and increase production, but also set up some state industries in an attempt to spark growth. The establishment of the RATG prompted a minor economic boom, and also caused the primary direct demand placed on Southern Rhodesia's black population during the early stages of the war—a programme of conscripted labour to build the aerodromes.

The government assigned labour quotas for each district to native commissioners across the territory who in turn called on local chiefs and headmen to provide workers. The tribal leaders decided who was required at the kraal and who would report to the district native commissioner for work. This system, known locally as the chibaro, cibbalo, isibalo or chipara—according to Charles van Onselen, synonymous etymologically with concepts ranging from contract labour to slavery—had been relatively widespread during Company rule (1890–1923), but had fallen out of use by the 1930s. Some tribal communities were resettled to make room for the airstrips.

The chibaro workers received pay and provisions, but the salary of 15s/- per month compared unfavourably with the 17s/6d generally received on white-owned farms. It met with widespread opposition, with many men electing to run away rather than join the work parties. "Hundreds if not thousands", according to Kenneth Vickery, crossed into Bechuanaland or South Africa to avoid the call-up. Some suspected that after finishing the conscripted aerodrome work, they might be drafted to fight overseas. Rumours to this effect abounded enough that the chief native commissioner, H H D Simmonds, distributed a circular in November 1940 instructing the commissioners to make clear that the drafted men were required for labour only. (Note: Simmonds suspected that the rumours may have been spread by white employers to keep the labourers for themselves. The native commissioner in Gutu reported villagers producing "suspiciously new 'passes' from Europeans, dated a month or more back, saying they are later to return to employ".)

Voluntary employment increased sharply during 1940 and 1941, both among indigenous blacks and migrant labourers, but many white farmers still complained about a lack of manpower. A severe drought during the 1941–42 season led to a food shortage in the colony, prompting the passing in June 1942 of the Compulsory Native Labour Act, under which unemployed black males between 18 and 45 years of age could be conscripted for work on white-owned farms. Announcing the act, Tredgold—by now Minister of Native Affairs in addition to Defence and Justice—commented that its "principle ... would be intolerable under ordinary circumstances", but that the war made it necessary. The act required each draftee to work at least three months at 15s/- per month; the pay rose to 17s/6 if he agreed to stay a further three months. (Note: The base salary was increased to 17s/6 in 1943.) This conscription of labour contributed to the rise in the country's overall agricultural yield, but had a negative impact on the localised production of many kraals, either because too many men had been drafted for work elsewhere or because they had fled to avoid it. The scheme continued until the act's repeal in 1946.

A central Food Production Committee, set up in early 1942, organised the conscripted labourers and attempted to help the white farmers to grow all the crops they could. Maize production grew by 40% between 1942 and 1944, the potato harvest doubled and the onion crop grew sixfold by the end of the war. Production of the colony's most important cash crop, tobacco, was high throughout the war, averaging about 40 million pounds (18 million kg) annually. The number of cattle slaughtered by the beef industry increased by 134%, from 71,000 head in 1937 to 160,000 head in 1945. Vegetable dehydration, one of the Food Production Committee's main initiatives, proved a great success, allowing Rhodesia to export many products to the UK that would previously have spoiled in transit. Southern Rhodesia also provided goods to the Eastern Group Supply Council, a body set up in 1940 to co-ordinate the build-up of war materiel in India and other British colonies and dominions east of Suez, with the goal of reducing the amount of supplies shipped from the UK. A Rhodesian officer, Brigadier E G Cook, was the group's deputy controller general. Between 1941 and 1945 Southern Rhodesia contributed large quantities of timber, leather goods, soap and building materials.

=== Internment camps and Polish refugees ===
Thousands of Axis POWs and people described as "enemy aliens" were held in Southern Rhodesia during the conflict. These were mainly Italians and Germans, but there were also a handful from Iraq and the Levant; the colony furthermore hosted nearly 7,000 refugees from Poland. Britain delegated responsibility for co-ordinating investigation into enemy aliens in central Africa to the Southern Rhodesian government, which set up a system whereby the Criminal Investigation Department (CID) identified potential detainees while a body called the Internment Camps Corps oversaw the camps. Many of those held in Southern Rhodesia were sent there by Britain or authorities elsewhere in the Empire.

Five internment camps were set up in two waves. No. 1 (General) Internment Camp opened to the north-east of Salisbury in October 1939 and No. 2 (Tanganyika) Internment Camp, just south of the city, opened the following year, mostly housing Germans formerly resident in Tanganyika. The first two camps together had less than 800 inmates. The third, fourth and fifth camps were set up near Gatooma, Umvuma and Fort Victoria in 1941–42 to accommodate roughly 5,000 Italians from Somaliland and Abyssinia. The Internment Camps Corps' reliance on the elderly, the infirm and so-called "friendly aliens" to staff the three new camps led to indiscipline, poor living conditions and dozens of escapes. A 1943 government commission into the quality of the internment camps reported the second wave camps to be of far worse quality than those of the first wave.

Polish refugees were housed at dedicated settlements set up at Marandellas and Rusape, two towns about 40 km (25 mi) apart to the south-east of Salisbury, from 1943. (Note: Marandellas had two Polish settlements—one in Marandellas itself and one in Diggleford on the outskirts of town.) There were similar camps in Kenya, Nyasaland, Tanganyika, Northern Rhodesia and South Africa. The Polish settlements in Southern Rhodesia were run jointly by local authorities and the Polish consulate in Salisbury; the Polish government-in-exile in London provided funding. Transport back to Europe picked up sharply as the war came to a close, and by October 1945 less than 2,000 Polish refugees remained. Colonial officials were reluctant to let the Poles stay indefinitely, asserting that they were not culturally British enough and might have communist connections or sympathies, but most of those who remained showed little inclination to leave. Southern Rhodesia ultimately allowed around 726 Polish refugees to settle permanently after the war.

== End of the war ==
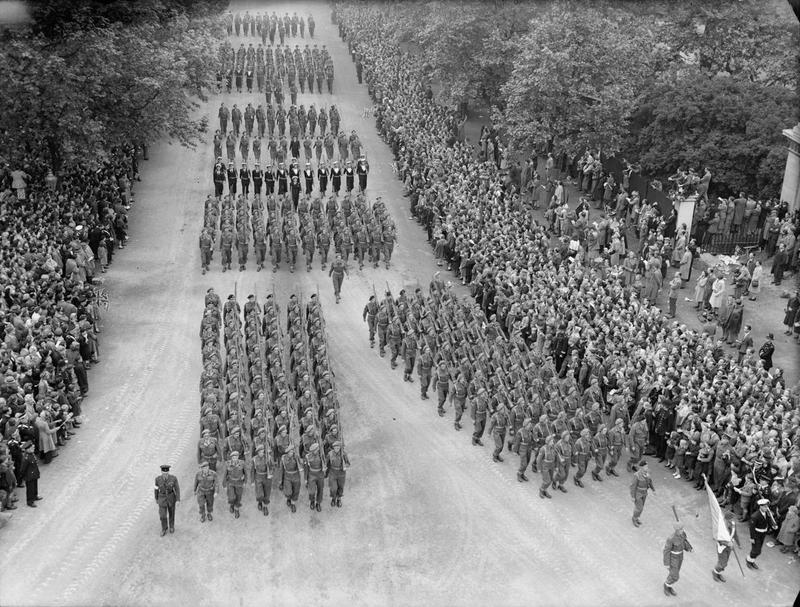
South African and Southern Rhodesian contingents marching in the London Victory Parade of 1946

Along with most of the Commonwealth and Allied nations, Southern Rhodesia sent a delegation of soldiers, airmen and seamen to London to take part in the grand Victory Parade of 8 June 1946. The colony's contingent, led by Colonel R E B Long, marched after South Africa and before Newfoundland. The Southern Rhodesian colour guard comprised a white officer and two black sergeants of the Rhodesian African Rifles. During the royal visit to Southern Rhodesia in April 1947, King George VI accorded the prefix "Royal" to the Rhodesia Regiment in recognition of its contributions to the two World Wars, and agreed to be its Colonel-in-Chief.

=== Statistics ===
Southern Rhodesia had contributed more manpower to the Allied cause in World War II, proportional to white population, than any other British dominion or colony, and more than the UK itself. According to figures compiled by MacDonald for his War History of Southern Rhodesia, 26,121 Southern Rhodesians served in the armed forces during the conflict, of whom 2,758 were commissioned officers. Broken down by race and gender, there were 15,153 black men, 9,187 white men, 1,510 white women and 271 coloured and Indian men. Of the 8,390 who served outside the territory, 1,505 were black men, 6,520 were white men, 137 were white women and 228 were coloured or Indian men.

According to official figures, 33,145 black Southern Rhodesians were conscripted for labour between 1943 and 1945; Vickery estimates that between 15,000 and 60,000 more may have worked on the aerodromes. According to Ashley Jackson's work The British Empire and the Second World War, the Rhodesian Air Training Group instructed 8,235 Allied pilots, navigators, gunners, ground crew and others—about 5% of overall EATS output. (Note: According to Jackson's figures, the scheme produced a total of 168,662 personnel, of whom Canada trained 116,417 (69%), Australia 23,262 (14%), South Africa 16,857 (10%), Southern Rhodesia 8,235 (5%) and New Zealand 3,891 (2%). Over 75,000 of these were pilots.)

A total of 2,409 Southern Rhodesians (977 officers and 1,432 other ranks) served in the RAF during the war, 373 (86 officers and 287 ratings) joined the Royal Navy, and 13 officers and 36 ratings from Southern Rhodesia mustered into the South African Navy. The vast majority of the rest served in either the Southern Rhodesian territorial forces or the British or South African Army. The colony's men and women received 698 decorations during the war; whites received 689 while black troops won nine. No coloured or Indian serviceman was decorated. Army officers won 269 decorations while the other ranks received 158; the air force officers and other ranks respectively won 184 and 72 decorations. All eight decorated Southern Rhodesian naval personnel were officers. Of the seven decorated women, all but one held commissioned rank. Two hundred and fifty-three Southern Rhodesians were mentioned in despatches during the war.

MacDonald records 916 Southern Rhodesian fatalities from enemy action during World War II—498 airmen, 407 ground troops, eight seamen and three female personnel—and 483 wounded, of whom 434 were soldiers, 47 were airmen and two were sailors.

== Legacy ==
The Rhodesian Air Training Group, widely accepted as the colony's main contribution to World War II, proved to be "one of the most important happenings in Rhodesian history", in the words of its commander Air Vice-Marshal Sir C W Meredith, as it led to great economic development and a large wave of immigration after the war by former instructors, trainees and other staff. This contributed to the swelling of Southern Rhodesia's white population to 135,596, over double its pre-war size, by 1951. RAF training operations in the country were stepped down considerably after the war, and the project formally ended in March 1954.

The strengthening of ties with South Africa continued following the war as both countries underwent considerable industrialisation. Between 1948 and 1953 Southern Rhodesia and South Africa operated a customs agreement under which most export and import duties were waived. The decade immediately following 1945 has been called "the moment when Southern Rhodesia's economy 'took off'". Huggins, secure in office at the end of the war, remained Prime Minister for another decade afterwards, and oversaw the colony's Federation with Northern Rhodesia and Nyasaland in 1953. He retired in 1956. Southern Rhodesia contributed to several Commonwealth counter-insurgency operations during the 1950s and early 1960s, including the Malayan Emergency, similar actions in Aden and Cyprus, and Operation Vantage in Kuwait.

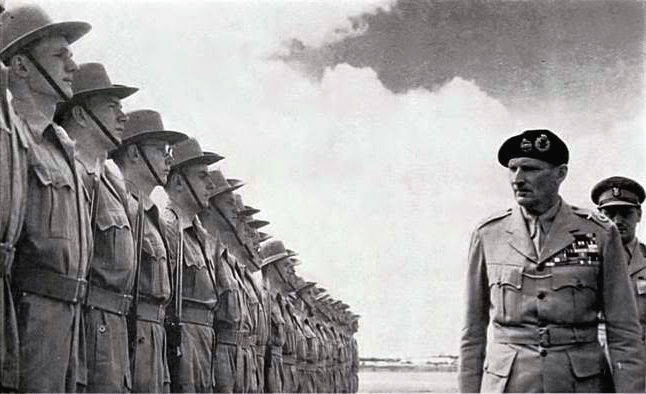
Field Marshal Bernard Montgomery inspects a Royal Rhodesia Regiment guard of honour, 1947

Amid decolonisation and the Wind of Change, the Federation failed to become a Commonwealth realm and collapsed in 1963. Two years later, following prolonged dispute with Britain over the terms for full sovereignty, the mostly white government in Southern Rhodesia (or Rhodesia, following Northern Rhodesia's independence as Zambia) issued a Unilateral Declaration of Independence (UDI). The Rhodesian government, which had in it World War II veterans including the Prime Minister Ian Smith, attempted to emphasise Rhodesians' prior war record on Britain's behalf by declaring independence on Armistice Day, 11 November, at 11:00 local time. As part of its subsequent isolation of Rhodesia, the UK government banned the post-UDI authorities from taking part in the annual Armistice Day service at the Cenotaph in London. Smith's government organised its own Rhodesian wreath-laying ceremony there. Veterans of World War II and Malaya held many key positions in the Rhodesian Security Forces during the Bush War of the 1970s.

After the country's reconstitution and recognised independence as Zimbabwe in 1980, Robert Mugabe's administration pulled down many monuments and plaques making reference to the dead of the First and Second World Wars, perceiving them as reminders of white minority rule and colonialism that went against what the modern state stood for. This view was partly rooted in the association of these memorials with those commemorating the British South Africa Company's dead of the Matabele Wars, as well as those memorialising Rhodesian servicemen killed during the Bush War. Many Zimbabweans saw their nation's involvement in the World Wars as a consequence of colonial rule that had more to do with the white community than the black majority.

The Cenotaph in Bulawayo commemorates Southern Rhodesians who served in the world wars and later conflicts, including the Bush War. A number of other memorials in Zimbabwe are maintained by the Commonwealth War Graves Commission.

== Sources ==
=== Books ===
- Berlyn, Phillippa (1978). The Quiet Man: A Biography of the Hon. Ian Douglas Smith. Salisbury: M O Collins. OCLC 4282978.
- Binda, Alexandre (2007). Heppenstall, David (ed.). Masodja: The History of the Rhodesian African Rifles and its forerunner the Rhodesian Native Regiment. Johannesburg: 30° South Publishers. ISBN 9781920143039.
- Binda, Alexandre (2012). The Rhodesia Regiment: From Boer War to Bush War 1899–1980. Alberton: Galago Publishing. ISBN 9781919854526.
- Blake, Robert (1977). A History of Rhodesia (First ed.). London: Eyre Methuen. ISBN 9780413283504.
- Cilliers, Jakkie (1984). Counter-Insurgency in Rhodesia. London, Sydney & Dover, New Hampshire: Croom Helm. ISBN 9780709934127.
- Corum, James S. "The RAF in Imperial Defence, 1919–1956". in Kennedy, Greg, ed. (2008). Imperial Defence: The Old World Order, 1856–1956. London: Routledge. pp. 152–175. ISBN 9780415355957.
- Gann, Lewis H; Gelfand, Michael (1964). Huggins of Rhodesia: The Man and His Country (First ed.). Sydney: Allen & Unwin. OCLC 531060.
- Gowlland-Debbas, Vera (1990). Collective Responses to Illegal Acts in International Law: United Nations action in the question of Southern Rhodesia (First ed.). Leiden: Martinus Nijhoff Publishers. ISBN 9780792308119.
- Jackson, Ashley (2006). The British Empire and the Second World War (First ed.). London: Continuum International Publishing Group. ISBN 9780826440495.
- Killingray, David (2012). Fighting for Britain: African Soldiers in the Second World War. London: James Currey. ISBN 9781847010476.
- Lake, Jon (2002). Lancaster Squadrons 1942–43. Oxford: Osprey Publishing. ISBN 9781841763132.
- Latimer, Jon (2002). Alamein (First ed.). Cambridge: Harvard University Press. ISBN 9780674010161.
- MacDonald, J F (1945). Lion With Tusk Guardant. Salisbury: Rhodesian Printing and Publishing. OCLC 85997210.
- MacDonald, J F (1947). The War History of Southern Rhodesia 1939–1945. Volume 1. Bulawayo: Books of Rhodesia. ISBN 9780869201381.
- MacDonald, J F (1950). The War History of Southern Rhodesia 1939–1945. Volume 2. Bulawayo: Books of Rhodesia. ISBN 9780869201404.
- McLaughlin, Peter (1980). Ragtime Soldiers: the Rhodesian Experience in the First World War. Bulawayo: Books of Zimbabwe. ISBN 9780869202340.
- Molinari, Andrea (2007). Desert Raiders: Axis and Allied Special Forces 1940–43. Oxford: Bloomsbury. ISBN 9781846030062.
- Nichols, Steve (2008). Malta Spitfire Aces. Osprey Aircraft of the Aces. Vol. 83 (First ed.). Oxford: Osprey Publishing. ISBN 9781846033056.
- Orpen, Neil (1975). Victory in Italy. South African Forces, World War II. Vol. 5 (First ed.). London: Purnell and Sons. OCLC 491093008.
- Petter-Bowyer, P J H (2005) [2003]. Winds of Destruction: the Autobiography of a Rhodesian Combat Pilot. Johannesburg: 30° South Publishers. ISBN 9780958489034.
- Radford, Mark (1994). Service Before Self: the History, Badges and Insignia of the Security Forces of the Rhodesias and Nyasaland, 1890–1980 (First ed.). Rockwell Green: M P Radford. ISBN 9780952447207.
- Salt, Beryl (2001). A Pride of Eagles: The Definitive History of the Rhodesian Air Force, 1920–1980. Weltevredenpark: Covos Day Books. ISBN 9780620237598.
- Saunders, Andy (2003). No 43 'Fighting Cocks' Squadron. Aviation Elite Units. Vol. 9 (First ed.). Oxford: Osprey Publishing. ISBN 9781841764399.
- Schwarz, Bill (2011). The White Man's World (First ed.). Oxford: Oxford University Press. ISBN 9780199296910.
- Smith, Ian (1997). The Great Betrayal: The Memoirs of Ian Douglas Smith. London: John Blake Publishing. ISBN 9781857822021.
- Stapleton, Timothy (2006). No Insignificant Part: The Rhodesia Native Regiment in the East Africa Campaign of the First World War. Waterloo: Wilfrid Laurier University Press. ISBN 9780889204980.
- Stapleton, Timothy (2011). African Police and Soldiers in Colonial Zimbabwe, 1923–80. Rochester: University of Rochester Press. ISBN 9781580463805.
- Thomas, Andrew (2002). Gloster Gladiator Aces. Osprey Aircraft of the Aces. Vol. 44 (First ed.). Oxford: Osprey Publishing. ISBN 184176289X.
- Weinrich, A K H (1973). Black and White Elites in Rural Rhodesia. Manchester: Manchester University Press. ISBN 9780719005336.
- Wood, Derek; Dempster, Derek (1967). The Narrow Margin: the Battle of Britain and the Rise of Air Power, 1930–1940. London: Arrow Books. OCLC 459294.
- Wood, J R T (2005). So Far And No Further! Rhodesia's Bid For Independence During the Retreat From Empire 1959–1965. Victoria: Trafford Publishing. ISBN 9781412049528.
- Young, Kenneth (1969) [1967]. Rhodesia and Independence: A Study in British Colonial Policy. London: J M Dent & Sons. OCLC 955160.

=== Journals ===
- Dumett, Raymond (1985). "Africa's Strategic Minerals During the Second World War". The Journal of African History. 26 (4). Cambridge: Cambridge University Press: 381–408. doi:10.1017/S0021853700028802. S2CID 163040373.
- Gann, Lewis H (1965). "The Development of Southern Rhodesia's Military System, 1890–1953" (Occasional Paper). Salisbury: National Archives of Rhodesia: 60–79.
- Meredith, Charles (July 1973). "The Rhodesian Air Training Group 1940–1945". Rhodesiana (28). Salisbury: The Rhodesiana Society: 16–29.
- Moorcraft, Paul (1990). "Rhodesia's War of Independence". History Today. 40 (9). London: History Today Ltd. ISSN 0018-2753.
- Phimister, I R (1991). "Secondary Industrialisation in Southern Africa: The 1948 Customs Agreement between Southern Rhodesia and South Africa". Journal of Southern African Studies. 17 (3). London: Routledge: 430–442. doi:10.1080/03057079108708286.
- Rupiah, Martin R (1995). "The History of the Establishment of Internment Camps and Refugee Settlements in Southern Rhodesia, 1938–1952" (PDF). Zambezia. XXII (ii). Harare: University of Zimbabwe: 137–152. ISSN 0379-0622.
- Samasuwo, Nhamo (2003). "Food Production and War Supplies: Rhodesia's Beef Industry during the Second World War, 1939–1945". Journal of Southern African Studies. 29 (2). London: Routledge: 487–502. doi:10.1080/03057070306206. S2CID 155009986.
- Tavuyanagoa, Baxter; Mugutia, Tasara; Hlongwana, James (2012). "Victims of the Rhodesian Immigration Policy: Polish Refugees from the Second World War". Journal of Southern African Studies. 38 (4). London: Routledge: 951–965. doi:10.1080/03057070.2012.739378. S2CID 143740346.
- Vickery, Kenneth P (1989). "The Second World War Revival of Forced Labour in the Rhodesias". International Journal of African Historical Studies. 22 (3). Boston: Boston University: 423–437. doi:10.2307/220204. JSTOR 220204.
