= Henry Robinson (bishop) =

English cleric and bishop of Carlisle

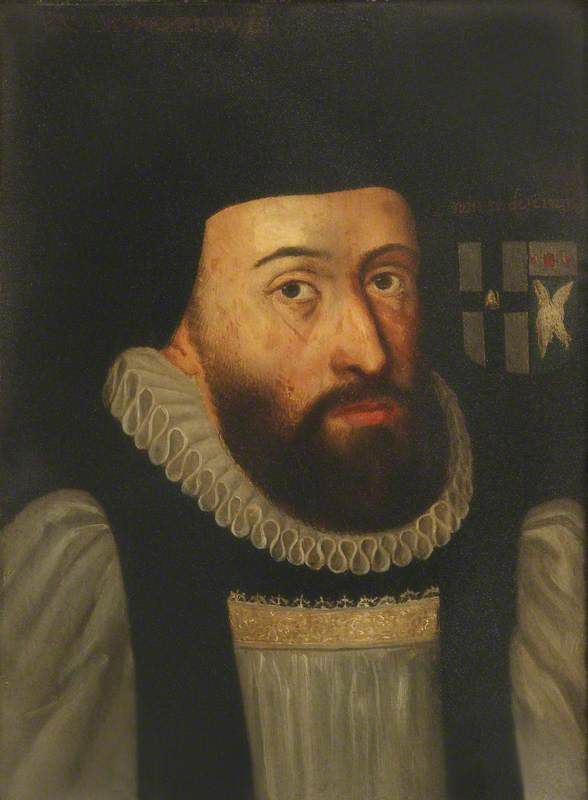
Bishop Robinson

Henry Robinson (c. 1553 – 19 June 1616) was an English cleric who served as Bishop of Carlisle from 1598 to 1616. He was educated at The Queen's College, Oxford (B.A. 12 July 1572, M.A. 20 June 1575, B.D. 10 July 1582, and D.D. 6 July 1590). He was elected fellow of Queen's in 1575, was Principal of St Edmund Hall, Oxford from 1576 to 1581, and then Provost of Queen's from 1581 to 1598. He was also a member of Gray's Inn from 1601 and took part in the Hampton Court Conference of 1603.

== Memorial Inscription ==
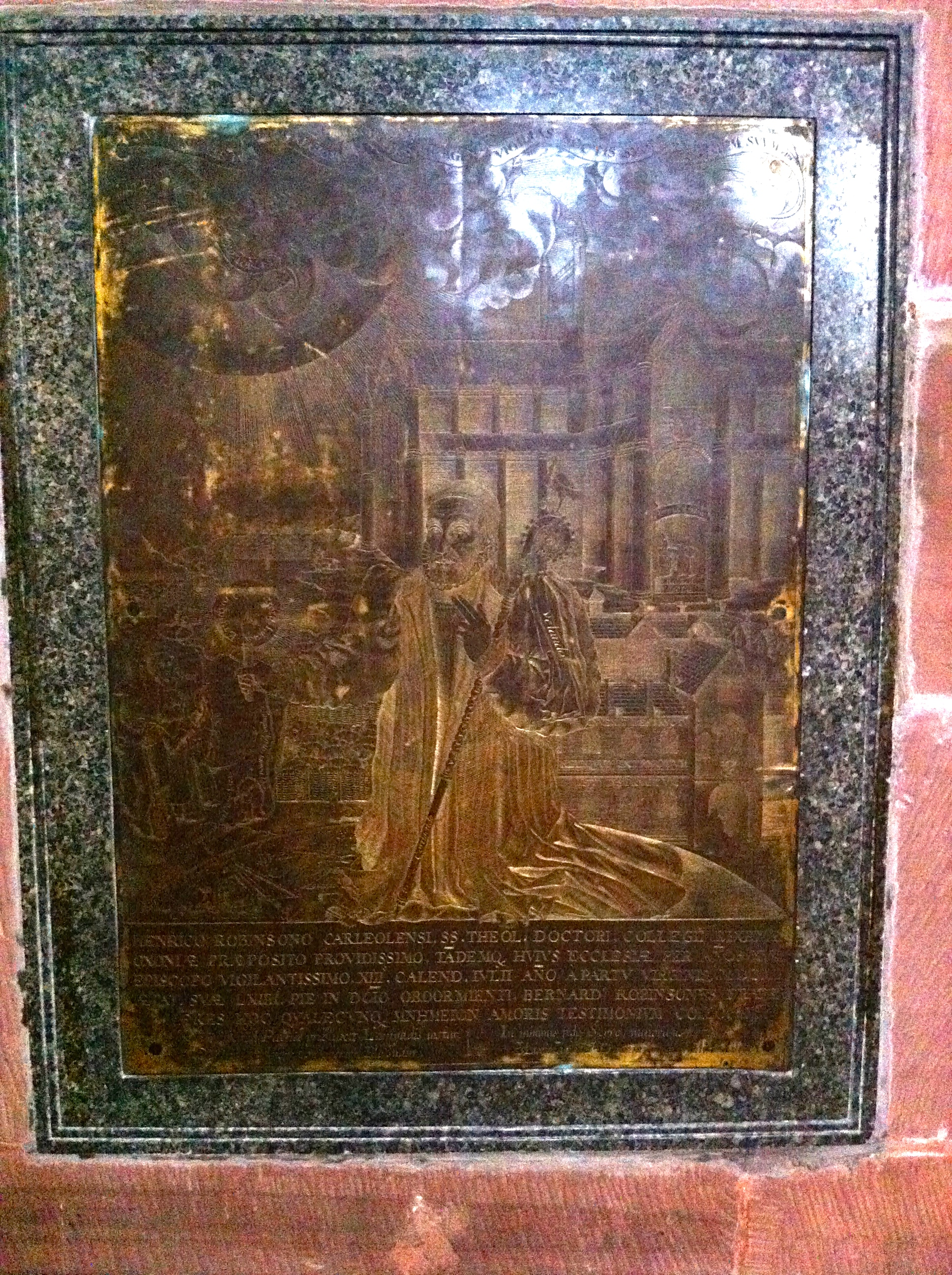

Memorial to Bishop Henry Robinson in Carlisle Cathedral. The inscription reads:

Henrico Robinsono Carleolensi SS. Theol. Doctori, collegii reginae Oxoniae praeposito providissimo, tandemq. hujus Ecclesiae per annos xviii Episcopo vigilantissimo. xiii^{o} Calend. Julii, anno apartu virginis, 1616, aetat. suae lxiiii^{o} pie in Domino obdormienti. Bernard' Robinsonus frater ac haeres hoc qualecunq. μνημειον, amoris testimonium collocavit.

Non sibi, sed Patriae, praeluxit Lampadis instar,
Deperdens oleam, non operam, Ille suam:
In minimis fide Servo, majoribus apto,
Maxima nunc Domini gaudia adire datur.

To Henry Robinson of Carlisle, Doctor of Sacred Theology, the most provident Provost of The Queen's College, Oxford, and also for 18 years the most vigilant Bishop of this church. On 19th June [13th of the Calends of July] in the year of the virgin birth 1616, in the 64th year of his age, he fell to sleep in the holy Lord. Bernard Robinson his brother and heir placed this memorial, a testimony of his love.

Not from him, but from the nation, the likeness of a light shines,
Exhausting its oil, not his labour:
In servitude to faith in the least things, as in greater things,
He is now permitted to enter upon the greatest joy of the Lord.

Academic offices
Preceded by Philip Johnson	Principal of St Edmund Hall, Oxford; 1576–1581	Succeeded by Thomas Bowsfield
Preceded by Bartholomew Bousfield	Provost of The Queen's College, Oxford; 1581–1598	Succeeded by Henry Airay
Church of England titles
Preceded by John May	Bishop of Carlisle; 1598–1616	Succeeded by Robert Snowden
