= John Moffatt (physicist) =

British physicist

Provost of The Queen's College, Oxford
- In office 1987–1993
- Preceded by: Robert Blake, Baron Blake
- Succeeded by: Geoffrey Marshall

Personal details
- Born: 12 October 1922
- Died: 23 December 2013 (aged 91)
- Citizenship: United Kingdom
- Spouse: Una Lamorna Morris (m. 1949; died 1992)
- Children: One
- Education: Keighley Boys' Grammar School
- Alma mater: Magdalen College, Oxford

John Moffatt (12 October 1922 – 23 December 2013) was a British physicist and academic. He was the provost of The Queen's College, Oxford, from 1987 to 1993.

== Early life and education ==
Moffatt was born on 12 October 1922 to Jacob and Ethel Moffatt. He was educated at Keighley Boys' Grammar School, an all-boys grammar school in Keighley, Yorkshire. He studied at Magdalen College, Oxford, and graduated with a Bachelor of Arts (BA), later promoted to Master of Arts (MA Oxon) degree, and a Doctor of Philosophy (DPhil) degree.

== Academic career ==
From 1942 to 1946, Moffatt was involved in radar research with British Thomson-Houston. Having joined the University of Oxford, he worked as a senior research officer at its Clarendon Laboratory. In 1950, he was elected a fellow and praelector in physics. He was also a lecturer in the Department of Nuclear Physics from 1965 and served as senior tutor of his college from 1972 to 1976. He served as Provost of The Queen's College, Oxford, between 1987 and 1993. He retired from academia in 1993 and was appointed an honorary fellow.

== Personal life ==
In 1949, Moffatt married Una Lamorna Morris. Together they had one daughter.

Moffatt died on 23 December 2013, aged 91 years.

Academic offices
Preceded by Robert Blake, Baron Blake	Provost of The Queen's College, Oxford; 1987 to 1993	Succeeded by Geoffrey Marshall
