= Paul Madden (chemist) =

British chemist

Professor Paul Madden FRS FRSE

Provost of The Queen's College, Oxford
- In office 2008–2019

Joseph Black Professor of Chemistry, University of Edinburgh
- In office 2006–2008

Personal details
- Born: Paul Anthony Madden; 10 October 1948 (age 77)

Paul Anthony Madden (born 10 October 1948) is a British chemist and former Provost of The Queen's College, Oxford.

== Early life ==
Madden attended St Bede's Grammar School, a Catholic boys' grammar school in Bradford, Yorkshire, England. He gained BSc and DPhil degrees in chemistry at the University of Sussex. His doctoral thesis was titled "Reactive Scattering Calculations" and was completed in 1974.

== Career ==
From 1981 to 1984 he worked at the Royal Signals and Radar Establishment in Malvern, Worcestershire.

From 1984 until 2005 he was Fellow in Chemistry at The Queen's College, Oxford and also Senior Tutor of the college and Chairman of the University Information Technology Committee. From 2004 until 2008 he was Professor of Physical Chemistry and Director of Centre for Science at Extreme Conditions at the University of Edinburgh. He took up the office of Provost of The Queen's College on 2 August 2008 and was succeeded by Dr Claire Craig CBE on 2 August 2019.

He was awarded the Mulliken Medal of the University of Chicago for his achievements in Theoretical and Physical Chemistry. He has served as Miller Visiting Professor at the University of California, Berkeley. He was elected to the Fellowship of the Royal Society in 2001 and is a Fellow of the Royal Society of Edinburgh.

He was appointed a member of the ad hoc Board of Electors to the Professorship of Chemistry in the University of Cambridge on the nomination of the Faculty Board of Chemistry.

== Personal life ==
He is married to Alison.

Academic offices
Preceded by Alan Budd	Provost of The Queen's College, Oxford; 2008 - 2019	Succeeded by Claire Craig
