= Kasungu Airport =

Airport in Malawi

- IATA: KBQ; ICAO: FWKG

Summary
- Airport type: Public
- Operator: Government
- Serves: Kasungu, Malawi
- Elevation AMSL: 3,470 ft (1,060 m)
- Coordinates: 13°00′52″S 033°28′06″E

Map
- Location of airport in Malawi

Runways
Direction	Length		Surface
Direction	m	ft	Surface
08/26	1,200	3,937	Asphalt
- Source: DAFIF

Kasungu Airport (IATA: KBQ, ICAO: FWKG) is an airport serving Kasungu, a town in the Central Region of the Republic of Malawi.

== Facilities ==
The airport resides at an elevation of 3,470 feet (1,058 m) above mean sea level. It has one runway designated 08/26 with an asphalt surface measuring 1,200 by 17 metres (3,937 ft × 56 ft).
