= List of provosts of the Queen's College, Oxford =

The head of the Queen's College, Oxford, is the Provost. The current Provost is Paul Johnson.

Name	From	To	Notes
Robert de Eglesfield	1341	1349	Founding provost
William de Muskham	1349	1350	
John de Hotham	1350	1361	
Henry Whitfield	1361	1377	
Thomas de Carlisle	1377	1404	
Roger Whelpdale	1404	1420	
Walter Bell	1420	1426	
Roland Byres	1426	1432	
Thomas Eglesfield	1432	1440	
William Spenser	1440	1460	
John Pereson	1460	1483	
Henry Bost	1483	1487	Previously Provost of Eton College
Thomas Langton	1487	1496	Previously Bishop of St David's; concurrently Bishop of Salisbury; subsequently Bishop of Winchester and Archbishop-elect of Canterbury
Christopher Bainbridge	1496	1508	Subsequently Archbishop of York
Edward Rigge	1508	1515	
John Pantre	1515	1541	
William Denysson	1541	1559	
Hugh Hodgson	1559	1561	
Thomas Francis	1561	1563	
Lancelot Shaw	1563	1565	
Alan Scot	1565	1575	
Bartholomew Bousfield	1575	1581	
Henry Robinson	1581	1598	
Henry Airay	1598	1616	
Barnaby Potter	1616	1626	
Christopher Potter	1626	1646	
Gerard Langbaine the elder	1646	1658	
Thomas Barlow	1658	1675	Subsequently Bishop of Lincoln
Timothy Halton	1677	1704	
William Lancaster	1704	1717	
John Gibson	1717	1730	
Joseph Smith	1730	1756	
Joseph Browne	1756	1767	
Thomas Fothergill	1767	1796	
Septimus Collinson	1796	1827	
John Fox	1827	1855	
William Thomson	1855	1862	Subsequently Archbishop of York
William Jackson	1862	1878	
John Richard Magrath	1878	1930	
E. M. Walker	1930	1933	
B. H. Streeter	1933	1937	
R. H. Hodgkin	1937	1946	
Lord Franks	1946	1948	
John Walter Jones	1948	1962	
Lord Florey	1962	1968	
Lord Blake	1968	1987	
John Moffatt	1987	1993	
Geoffrey Marshall	1993	1999	
Sir Alan Budd	1999	2008	
Paul Madden	2008	2019	
Claire Craig	2019	2025	
Paul Johnson	2025		
