= Central African Airways Flight 890 =

1958 aviation accident

Coordinates: 32°05′49″N 20°16′10″E

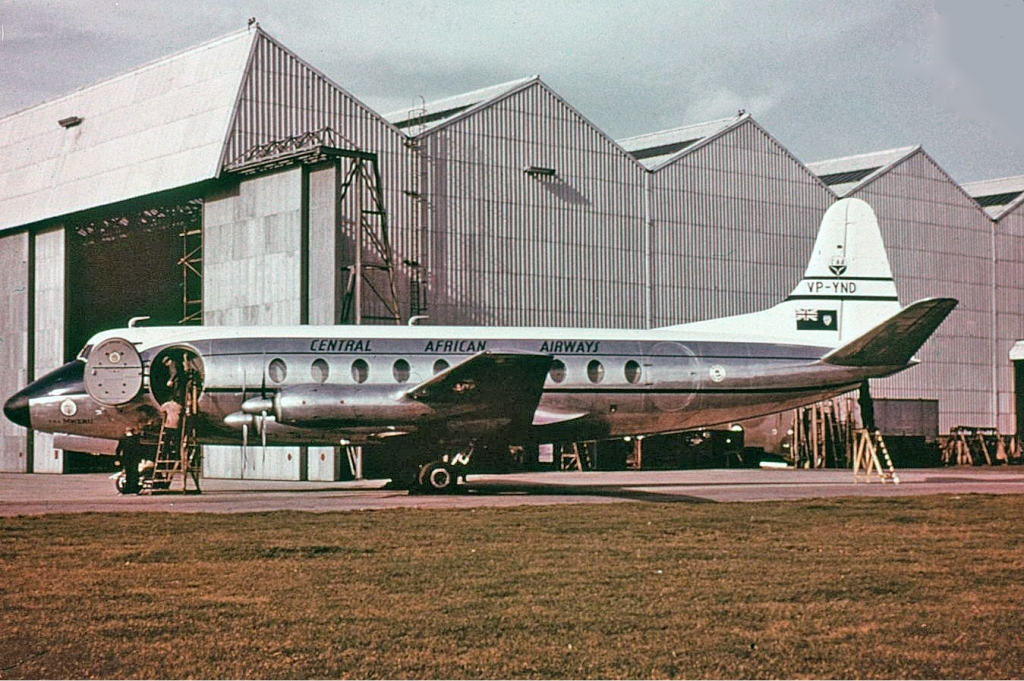
- A Central African Airways Vickers Viscount

Accident
- Date: 9 August 1958
- Summary: Pilot error
- Site: near Benina International Airport

Aircraft
- Aircraft type: Vickers Viscount 748D
- Aircraft name: Mpika
- Operator: Central African Airways
- Registration: VP-YNE
- Flight origin: Salisbury Airport
- 1st stopover: Ndola Airport
- 2nd stopover: Entebbe International Airport
- 3rd stopover: Khartoum International Airport
- 4th stopover: Wadi Halfa Airport
- Last stopover: Benina International Airport
- Destination: Heathrow Airport
- Passengers: 47
- Crew: 7
- Fatalities: 36
- Injuries: Unknown
- Survivors: 18

Central African Airways Flight 890, a Vickers Viscount 745D, crashed during a scheduled passenger flight from Wadi Halfa, Sudan, to Benghazi, Libya, about 9 kilometres (5.6 mi) southeast of Benina International Airport in Libya. A total of forty-seven passengers and seven crew members were on board of whom only eighteen survived, making it the deadliest ever plane crash in Libya at the time of the accident. It was also the deadliest accident for Central African Airways.

== Cause of the crash ==
According to an International Civil Aviation Organization accident digest, the plane crashed while making a nighttime approach to runway 33R, and while flying in clouds the pilot descended below a safe altitude, causing the aircraft to crash into high ground. While the reason for the quick descent remains unknown, it is believed the pilot may have misinterpreted the reading of his altimeter as a result of fatigue and possible indisposition.

== See also ==
- Aviation safety
- List of accidents and incidents involving commercial aircraft
