= Geoffrey Marshall (constitutionalist) =

British legal scholar

Geoffrey Marshall (22 April 1929 – 24 June 2003) was a leading constitutional theorist in the United Kingdom, best known for his work around the British constitution.

== Early life ==
Marshall was born in Chesterfield on 22 April 1929. His family moved to Blackpool, and Marshall joined Arnold School on a county scholarship. He turned down a place at Balliol College, Oxford, on the grounds that the facilities' heating was not good enough. Instead, in 1947 he joined Manchester University, reading Politics and Economics, and graduated in 1950. He attended lectures by Harold Laski and was asked to prepare them for publication, which he did under the title Reflections on the Constitution.

== Career ==
His first book, Parliamentary Sovereignty and the Commonwealth, was published in 1957. He described "sovereignty" as "an institutional arrangement resting upon an idea, and the idea is one which has philosophical (and even theological) implications". In 1959, his second book, co-authored by Graeme Moodie, was entitled Some Problems of the Constitution and dealt with ministerial responsibility. He examined the controls on government and the means of redress of the citizen against the state. He was elected a fellow and tutor in Politics at The Queens's College, Oxford, in 1957, where he stayed until his retirement in 1999.

Academic offices
Preceded by John Moffatt	Provost of The Queen's College, Oxford; 1993 to 1999	Succeeded by Alan Budd
