= Claire Craig =

British geophysicist (born 1962)

Claire Craig CBE
- Born: Claire Harvey Craig; February 8, 1962 (age 64); Scunthorpe
- Education: Redland High School for Girls; University of Cambridge (BA, PhD)
- Spouse: Christopher Diacopoulos (m. 1999)
- Scientific career
- Workplaces: University of Oxford; University of Texas at Austin; McKinsey & Company
- Thesis: Numerical modelling of mantle convection and the geoid (1985)
- Website: www.queens.ox.ac.uk/people/dr-claire-craig

Claire Harvey Craig CBE (born 1961) is a British geophysicist, civil servant and science communicator. She was Provost of The Queen's College, Oxford from 2019 to 2025.

== Education ==
Craig was educated at Redland High School for Girls and Newnham College, Cambridge, where she gained a Bachelor of Arts degree in Natural Sciences in 1982. In 1985, she was awarded a Ph.D. also from the University of Cambridge for research on numerical modelling of mantle convection and the geoid.

== Career and research ==
Criag was a postdoctoral research fellow at the University of Texas at Austin from 1986 to 1987 and an associate at McKinsey & Company from 1997 to 1999. She served as director of Government Office for Science and later Chief Science Policy Officer at the Royal Society. She serves as a member of the AI Council.

In 2018 it was announced that she had been pre-elected to serve as the Provost of The Queen's College, Oxford from 2 August 2019; she is the first woman to hold the post. In January 2024 it was announced that she would stand down as Provost during the next academic year. She was succeeded by Paul Johnson on 2 August 2025.

=== Awards and honours ===
Craig was appointed Commander of the Order of the British Empire (CBE) in the 2006 Birthday Honours in recognition of her role in the development of Foresight, the government of the United Kingdom's scientific-based strategic futures program. In 2021 she received an Honorary Doctorate of Science from the University of Bath.

== Personal life ==
Craig married Christopher Diacopoulos in 1999.

Academic offices
Preceded by Paul Madden	Provost of The Queen's College, Oxford; 2019 -	Succeeded by Incumbent
