= Robert Blake, Baron Blake =

British historian (1916–2003)

The Right Honourable The Lord Blake FBA FRSL
- Born: 23 December 1916; Brundall, Norfolk
- Died: 20 September 2003 (aged 86); Brundall, Norfolk
- Education: Magdalen College, Oxford
- Occupation: Historian
- Notable work: Disraeli (1966); The Conservative Party from Peel to Churchill (1970)
- Political party: Conservative

Member of the House of Lords
- Lord Temporal
- Life peerage 17 May 1971 – 20 September 2003

Robert Norman William Blake, Baron Blake, FBA, FRSL (23 December 1916 – 20 September 2003), was an English historian and peer. He is best known for his 1966 biography of Benjamin Disraeli, and for The Conservative Party from Peel to Churchill, which grew out of his 1968 Ford lectures.

== Early life ==
Robert Blake was born in Brundall, Norwich, the elder son of William Joseph Blake, a schoolmaster, and of Norah Lindley Blake, (née Daynes), the daughter of a leading Norwich solicitor. The family firm was Daynes, Hill & Perks, subsequently acquired by Eversheds. He was said to be related to Admiral Robert Blake, of the Parliamentary navy.

Blake was educated at a dame school in Brundall; King Edward VI's Norwich School, where his father taught History; and Magdalen College, Oxford, where he was an Eldon Law Scholar. He graduated from Oxford with a First in Modern Greats and a hockey Blue. One of his contemporaries at Oxford was Sir Keith Joseph.

Blake had planned to go to the bar. However, when the Second World War broke out he was commissioned into the Royal Artillery, turning down an offer from a friend to join MI5. He was taken prisoner at the Siege of Tobruk in 1942, escaped from Italy in 1944, and was mentioned in despatches. He worked for MI6 from 1944 to 1946, where he was a colleague of Kim Philby.

== Academic career ==
In 1947 he became a student (fellow) and tutor in Politics at Christ Church, Oxford, replacing Lord Pakenham, who had joined Clement Attlee's government. His first work was an edition of the papers of Douglas Haig, which did much to restore Haig's reputation. It was followed by a biography of Bonar Law, written at the invitation of Lord Beaverbrook, Law's executor.

Blake's most famous work is his 1966 Disraeli, a biography of Benjamin Disraeli, which has been variously described as "the best single-volume biography of any British prime minister" and "the best biography of anyone in any language". He was elected a Fellow of the British Academy the following year.

Having abandoned a project for a biography of Lord Derby, in 1970 he published The Conservative Party from Peel to Churchill, a general history of the Conservative Party based on his 1968 Ford Lectures. The work was later extended to cover the period up to the premiership of Margaret Thatcher and, later, that of John Major.

In 1968 he was elected provost of The Queen's College, Oxford, a post he retained until retirement in 1987. On 17 May 1971, on the recommendation of the Prime Minister Edward Heath, Blake was created a life peer as Baron Blake, of Braydeston in the County of Norfolk. In the House of Lords he took the Conservative whip. In 1972 he moved the address in reply to the Queen's Speech.

His History of Rhodesia (1977) is, according to Kenneth O. Morgan, "essentially a study of white rule, ending with sharp comments on the illegal breakaway regime of Ian Smith, where Blake's views were much influenced by his friendship with the liberal Garfield Todd and his daughter". It makes interesting reading in conjunction with the less critical Rainbow on the Zambezi (1953) by Don Taylor.

In 1987 Lord Blake was nominated in the election for the Oxford Chancellorship, but lost to Roy Jenkins, although polling ahead of Edward Heath. Blake was hurt by the fact that the Cabinet had decided to endorse Heath, and became withdrawn from Oxford.

In 1990 he was one of the leading historians behind the setting up of the History Curriculum Association. The Association advocated a more knowledge-based history curriculum in schools. It expressed "profound disquiet" at the way history was being taught in the classroom and observed that the integrity of history was threatened.

In 1992 Blake gave the centenary Romanes Lecture on "Gladstone, Disraeli and Queen Victoria".

Blake was for many years Senior Member (the University don responsible for ruling on internal disputes such as accusations of electoral malpractice) of the Oxford University Conservative Association.

== Politics ==
Concomitant with his study of Conservative history, Blake was a political Conservative, and took the Conservative whip in the House of Lords. He defended the British government during the Suez Crisis and in later life was a Eurosceptic. He was, however, a supporter of proportional representation, and served as the Chairman of the Electoral Reform Society. He also rebelled over the War Crimes Bill.

Lord Blake opposed the Labour Party's policy to abolish the hereditary peers in the House of Lords. Writing the year before the 1997 general election, he commented:

Abolition of the hereditary vote ... is alleged to be phase one of a policy to substitute an elective Upper House for the existing chamber. Meanwhile we would have the biggest quango of all time: a House whose members would owe their seats solely to past or present prime ministerial patronage. Even as an interim measure, this would be thoroughly undesirable, and certainly no improvement on the present composition. The hereditary system, whatever its logical defects, does produce some people of independent opinions and also some who are much younger than the normal run of middle-aged legislators ... My guess is that after achieving stage one, which would involve a great deal of parliamentary time and much controversy, a Labour Cabinet would rest on its oars and postpone for many years any plans for an elective chamber. There are immense difficulties involved – its powers, electoral system, and above all relations with the Commons, which would certainly resent the creation of a body with rival claims to democratic legitimacy.

Blake was a Conservative member of Oxford City Council from 1957 to 1964.

== Other activities and honours ==
Blake served as a Trustee of the Rhodes Trust from 1971 to 1987, and as Chair of the Rhodes Trustees from 1983 to 1987. He was editor of the Dictionary of National Biography, a Trustee of the British Museum, and Chairman of the Royal Commission on Historical Manuscripts. He was High Bailiff and Searcher of the Sanctuary of Westminster Abbey between 1988 and 1989, and High Steward of Westminster Abbey from 1989 to 1999.

He was a Director of Channel 4 Television.

Portraits of Lord Blake hang at The Queen's College, Oxford, and at Rhodes House, Oxford.

== Family ==
Blake married Patricia Mary Waters (1925–1995), the daughter of a Norfolk farmer, on 22 August 1953; Hugh Trevor-Roper was the best man. The couple had three daughters. One daughter, Letita, is the Secretary of the Monte San Martino Trust, which awards English-language study bursaries to young Italians in recognition of assistance offered to thousands of escaping Allied prisoners-of-war during the Second World War, whose number included Blake. Another daughter, Victoria, is a crime novelist.

== Works ==
- The Private Papers of Douglas Haig (1952; editor)
- The Unknown Prime Minister. The Life and Times of Andrew Bonar Law, 1858–1923 (1955)
- Disraeli (1966)
- Disraeli and Gladstone (1969; Stephen Lecture)
- The Conservative Party from Peel to Churchill (1970; later revised and updated as The Conservative Party from Peel to Thatcher (1985), then again as The Conservative Party from Peel to Major)
- The Office of Prime Minister (1975)
- Conservatism in an Age of Revolution (1976)
- History of Rhodesia (1977)
- Disraeli's Grand Tour: Benjamin Disraeli and the Holy Land, 1830–31 (1982)
- The English World (1982)
- The Decline of Power, 1915–1964 (1985; part of The Paladin History of England series)
- An Incongruous Partnership: Lloyd George and Bonar Law ISBN 0907158552 (1992; The Welsh Political Archive Lecture)
- Gladstone, Disraeli and Queen Victoria. Centenary Romanes Lecture (1993)
- Churchill: A Major New Assessment of His Life in Peace and War (1993; edited with Wm Roger Louis)
- Winston Churchill (1998)
- Jardine Matheson. Traders of the Far East (1999)

Academic offices
Preceded by Howard Florey	Provost of The Queen's College, Oxford; 1968 to 1987	Succeeded by John Moffatt
