= Charles Warburton Meredith =

South African air force pilot

Air Vice-Marshal Sir Charles Warburton Meredith KBE CB AFC
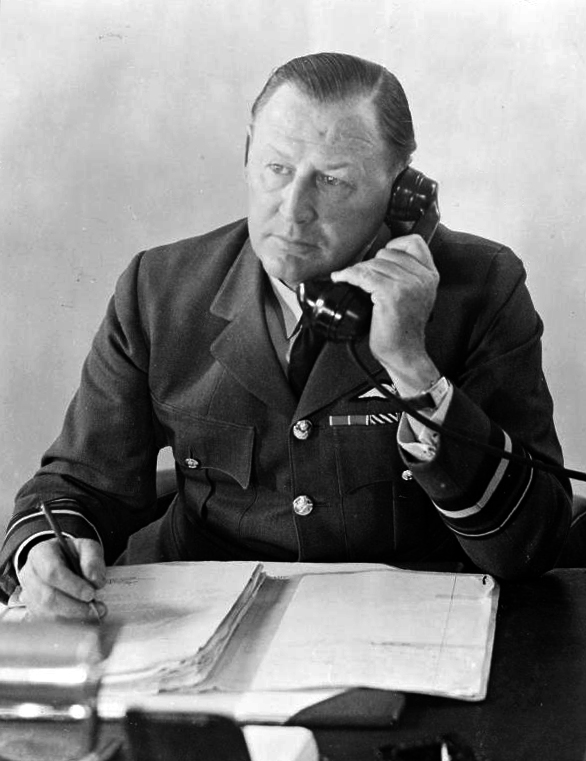
- Meredith in Salisbury during the Second World War
- Born: 23 August 1896; Wynberg, Cape Town
- Died: 19 April 1977 (aged 80)
- Military career
- Allegiance: British Empire
- Branch: Royal Flying Corps (Military Wing); South African Air Force; Royal Air Force Volunteer Reserve
- Service years: 1917-1945
- Rank: Air Vice-Marshal
- Commands: Rhodesian Air Training Group
- Wars: First World War; Second World War
- Awards: Air Force Cross; Grand Commander Royal Order of the Phoenix (with swords)

Air Vice-Marshal Sir Charles Warburton Meredith KBE CB AFC (23 August 1896 – 19 April 1977) was a South African air force pilot, and Air Officer Commanding of the Rhodesian Air Training Group during the Second World War.

== Early life and family ==
Meredith was born in Wynberg, Cape Town, and attended Wynberg Boys' High School. He was an electrical engineering student with South African Railways before becoming a cadet at RAF Staff College, Andover and was then commissioned as Second Lieutenant in the Royal Flying Corps (Military Wing) in October 1917. He was promoted to Flying Officer in February 1918.

After the First World War, in 1924, he joined the South African Air Force, having been recruited by Major Allister Miller, and in 1937 was appointed Commanding Officer of the Aircraft and Artillery Depot.

He was appointed Director of Civil Aviation in Southern Rhodesia in 1939.

Meredith was commissioned Air Commodore in the Royal Air Force Volunteer Reserve on 21 March 1940 for the duration of the hostilities. He was promoted to Air Vice-Marshal during the War.

== Rhodesian Air Training Group ==
Meredith was Air Officer Commanding of the Rhodesian Air Training Group, part of the Empire Air Training Scheme. Sir Archibald Sinclair, the British Secretary of State for Air, praised the excellent quality of the reinforcements coming to the RAF from the RATG.

Meredith expressed in 1943 that the Air Training Group would expand and that the expansion would be beneficial after the war for aeronautical training.

Meredith is the author of an article, "The Rhodesian Air Training Group 1940–1945", in a Rhodesian historical journal, published in July 1973.

== Honours ==
Meredith was awarded the Air Force Cross in June 1919.

He was appointed Commander of the Most Excellent Order of the British Empire (CBE) in July 1941; Grand Commander of the Royal Order of the Phoenix (with swords) in 1943; and Companion of the Most Honourable Order of the Bath (Military Division) in June 1943.
