= RAF Guinea Fowl =

Former Royal Air Force base in Zimbabwe

RAF Guinea Fowl
- Gweru in Zimbabwe

Site information
- Owner: Air Ministry
- Operator: Royal Air Force
- Controlled by: Rhodesian Air Training Group

Location
- Shown within Zimbabwe
- Coordinates: 19°31′47″S 29°56′13″E

Site history
- Built: 1940
- In use: 1940 - 1945

Royal Air Force Guinea Fowl or more simply RAF Guinea Fowl, was a World War II Royal Air Force station located in Gweru, Southern Rhodesia (now Zimbabwe). It was established in 1940 as part of the Rhodesian Air Training Group under the Empire Air Training Scheme. It provided flight training to Commonwealth pilot cadets from 1940 until disbandment in 1945.

== History ==
RAF Guinea Fowl began construction in May 1940 as part of the Empire Air Training Scheme. Initially, the site was bare veld, which provided an ideally flat and wide-open area for the construction of an air station. It was connected by an adjacent single-track railway line connecting to a previous training location in Bulawayo, allowing personnel to quickly travel between stations. In order to facilitate the construction of the station, special trains carrying personnel were halted, and building materials were brought in by train. In order to continue the transportation of personnel by special trains, a railway siding was established to prevent disruptions. Arrangements were also made for water supplies and water-borne sewerage. In August 1940, RAF Guinea Fowl was completed, taking only 12 weeks outpacing the construction of the facilitates at Belvedere Air Station; becoming one of the first air stations under the program to be established. It was one of the 11 operating stations in Southern Rhodesia, which provided training to Commonwealth airmen of the Royal Air Force.

=== Operations ===
Initially, it was called "Divide" as it was on top of the watershed between Gweru and Selukwe, and in the winter, it was occasionally covered with "guti," a Scotch mist which flows up from the south. Sauerdale was found to be unsuitable due to its surface condition, and RAF Guinea Fowl was taken as the second elementary school until RAF Induna was established. On 8 August, 1940, the No. 26 Elementary Flying Training School (EFTS) was established at RAF Guinea Fowl, and the station became under the command of Wing Commander John Marlow Thompson. De Havilland Tiger Moths and Fairchild Cornells were used by trainees to practice low flying exercises. Performances were organized by Max Jaffa (BBC Palm Court), providing morale-boosting events for the trainees. To ease congestion, a relief landing ground was established at Senali, and was assigned to the station. On 14 August, 1945, the No. 26 EFTS was disbanded, and RAF Guinea Fowl ceased operations.

=== Post-war ===
Following World War II, RAF Guinea Fowl remained abandoned and unused for aviation operations. In 1947, the existing RAF facilities were converted into a boys boarding school, operating until 1977. Following the independence of Zimbabwe in 1980, it became a military base for the Rhodesian Army by 1982, housing a government school.

== Units ==
- No. 26 Elementary Flying Training School, 8 August 1940 — 14 August 1945

== See also ==
- RAF Moffat
- RAF Kumalo
