= RAF Moffat =

Former Royal Air Force base in Zimbabwe

RAF Moffat
- Gweru in Zimbabwe
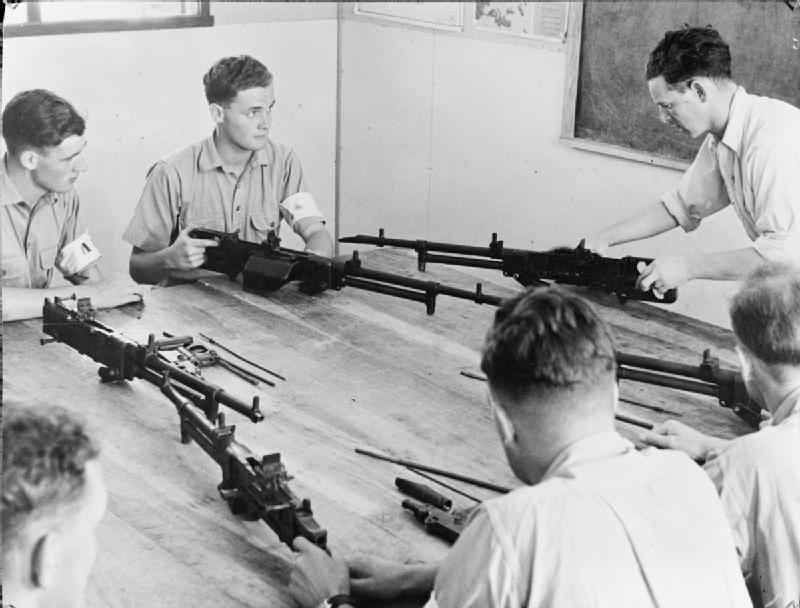
- An instructor, Corporal W Gilligan from Dublin,, gives pupils a practical lecture on the .303 Vickers K-type gas-operated machine gun at No. 24 Bombing, Gunnery and Navigation School, Moffat.

Site information
- Owner: Air Ministry
- Operator: Royal Air Force
- Controlled by: Rhodesian Air Training Group

Location
- Shown within Zimbabwe
- Coordinates: 19°28′47″S 29°47′19″E

Site history
- Built: 1941
- In use: 1941 - 1945

Royal Air Force Moffat or more simply RAF Moffat, was a World War II Royal Air Force station located in Gweru, Southern Rhodesia (now Zimbabwe). It was established in 1941 as part of the Rhodesian Air Training Group under the Empire Air Training Scheme. It provided flight training to Commonwealth pilot cadets from 1941 until disbandment in 1945.

== History ==
RAF Moffat was established in August 1941, and was the last training station to be established under the Empire Air Training Scheme. Following establishment, the No. 24 Combined Air Observation School (CAOS) arrived on 3 August, 1941. RAF Moffat was the first and only station in Southern Rhodesia to host a bombing, navigation and gunnery school, which trained bomb aimers, navigators, and air gunners. Two weeks after the station had opened, the first batch of cadets arrived to be trained as navigators. These included 19 Rhodesians, 10 British, 1 South African, 3 Australians, and 1 American, some of whom previously worked as farmers, clerks, schoolmasters, students, and chemists. As early as September 1941, RAF Moffat began providing classes on subjects such as English, Shorthand, German, Mathematics, and Economics. During the same month, the first batch of cadets were passed out. On 19 September, 1941, the station was visited by Sir Herbert Stanley, who was the governor of Southern Rhodesia at the time. By early 1942, RAF Moffat became the main centre for training aircrew from Greece, with the first batch arriving being trained as air gunners. Initially, they were assigned to interpreters, but they quickly picked up the English language. In December 1942, Group Captain C. Findlay became the station's commanding officer until closure. When he arrived, the station was known as 24 C.A.O.S, and the new title became Royal Air Force Station Moffat due to the latter sounding similar to "chaos".

=== Operations ===
Cadet training would have started with a navigator arriving from an EFTS where they would have learnt the elementary principles. When they arrived at RAF Moffat, they would pass in stages through Air Crew Pool and elementary navigation, into the bombing and gunnery school, and then to the average cadet. Cadets would have mostly spent their time on navigation exercises held at the station, and towards the end of the course, long-distance flights to South Africa and even Northern Rhodesia. On 12 May, 1943, the No. 24 CAOS was split and reorganized into the No. 24 Bombing Gunnery & Navigation School and the No. 29 Elementary Navigation School. In December 1943, a strong storm gale followed by torrential rain destroyed an equipment shed on the tarmac, and blew off the roof from some flight offices. Although several men were working in the building at the time, no casualties were caused, and documents and material were recovered before the rain hit.

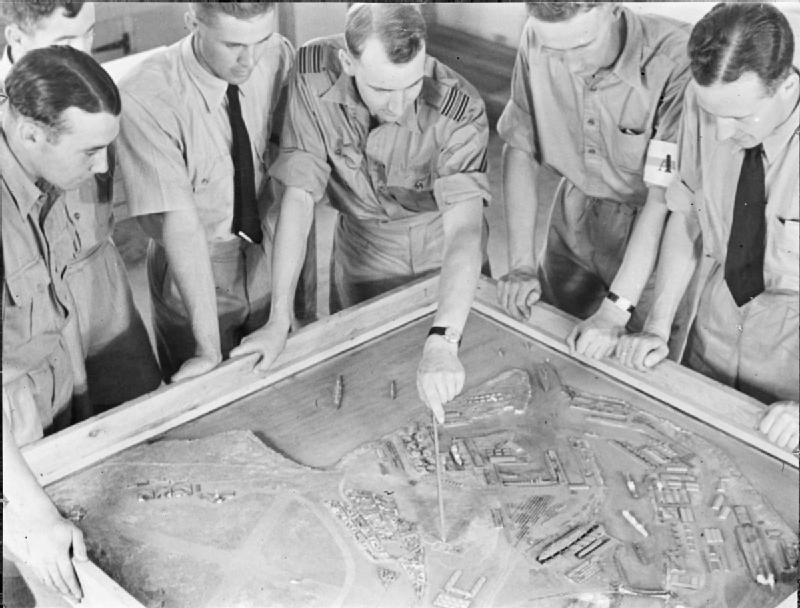
Squadron Leader I N M Macdonald points out salient features on a relief model of the dockyard at Brest during reconnaissance instruction at No. 24 Bombing, Gunnery and Navigation School, Moffat.

By 1944, the station had a fully completed camp following years of continuous additions and modifications. Access and internal roads and an apron were laid, and eight hangars were also installed. The accommodation facilities included an Officers' Mess, Airmen's Mess, barrack huts and living quarters, meteorological office, and a headquarters building. The camp also consisted of recreational and welfare facilities, which included a large concrete-built swimming pool known as "Moffat-by-the-Sea", measuring 75 ft x 45 ft with changing rooms and sun shelters, gardens, sports fields and a parade ground. Training facilities included a training library in a commandeered hut with chairs, tables, and charts reference books, air crew pool office for managing incoming trainees, and elementary navigation school classrooms. Other facilities included separate compound housing built behind the sports field for local workers employed as cooks, talons, clerks, filtration plant, canteen, and a branch of the Toc H organization was also established on station. On 13 April, 1945, the No. 24 Bombing Gunnery & Navigation School and the No. 29 Elementary Navigation School were disbanded. On 14 April, 1945, the final parade at RAF Moffat was held, attended by Air Vice-Marshal Sir Charles Warburton Meredith. Meredith had credited the gunner's course for achieving the best results of any school in the Empire Air Training Scheme, with one cadet achieving the Distinguished Flying Cross and Bar, ten achieving the Distinguished Flying Cross, and four achieving the Distinguished Flying Medal. In total, RAF Moffat had trained 778 navigators and 1,590 air gunners.

=== Post-war ===
Following the end of World War II, RAF Moffat was abandoned, and was never reused for scheduled commercial operations or military usage. The buildings were used by the Bata Shoe Company for their boot and shoe factory, influencing other agricultural and mineral production industries to open nearby, which included tanning, a glass works, steel foundry, precision engineering, asbestos products, industriak gases, concrete products, milking, and cereal manufacturing. As early as the 1980s, it was used for recreational gliding, named Moffat Field. Until the mid-2000s, the Midlands Gliding Club occupied the former airfield. The original RAF control tower was used as the clubhouse, while the last remaining northeastern hangar was used to store gliders. As most core members of the club had left the country, the Midlands Gliding Club ceased activity, leaving Moffat Field fully abandoned. Today, all hangars have since been demolished, with eight foundations of the hangars still visible in satellite imagery.

== Units ==
The following units that were based at RAF Moffat:

Royal Air Force

- No. 24 Combined Air Observation School, 3 August 1941 — 12 May 1943
- No. 24 Bombing Gunnery & Navigation School, 12 May 1943 — 13 April 1945
- No. 29 Elementary Navigation School, 12 May 1943 — 13 April 1945

== See also ==
- RAF Guinea Fowl
- RAF Kumalo
- Southern Rhodesia in World War II
