= ZSM =

ZSM may stand for:

- Zimbabwe School of Mines
- Zoologische Staatssammlung München (Munich State Zoological Collection), a German zoological institute

zsm:

- ISO 639-3 language code for Standard Malay

== See also ==
- ZSM-5 (Zeolite Socony Mobil 5), a zeolite used as a catalyst in oil refining
