= RAF Norton (Zimbabwe) =

Former Royal Air Force base in Zimbabwe

RAF Norton
- Norton, Mashonaland region in Zimbabwe

Site information
- Owner: Air Ministry
- Operator: Royal Air Force
- Controlled by: Rhodesian Air Training Group

Location
- Shown within Zimbabwe
- Coordinates: 17°53′19″S 30°41′43″E

Site history
- Built: 1941; 85 years ago
- In use: 1941 - 1944

Royal Air Force Norton or more simply RAF Norton, was a World War II Royal Air Force station located in Norton, about 30 kilometers west of Harare, Southern Rhodesia (now Zimbabwe). It was established in 1941 as part of the Rhodesian Air Training Group under the Empire Air Training Scheme, and was one of three stations in the Mashonaland region. It provided flight training to Commonwealth pilot cadets from 1941 until deactivation in 1944.

== History ==
=== Construction ===
As for most RAF stations, the planning for a station at Norton was done by Squadron Leader C. W. Glass, and the site selection was undertaken by Flight Lieutenant B. Roxburgh-Smith. The site was ideal as it had access by road and rail, had an ample supply of electricity, and was reasonably flat with adequate draining. However, as Norton was located more remotely than other stations located in Bulawayo and Gweru, special arrangements were made to obtain water from boreholes. Afterwards, the water would be chlorinated and stored in large tanks, providing a safe supply of water. Three hangars were built, and construction of the hangars was undertaken by Wrightson & Co., Ltd..

=== Operations ===
RAF Norton was completed and opened in late 1941, becoming the last station in Southern Rhodesia to open. It was equipped with essential facilities, which included hangars and workshops, ground training huts, administrative offices, living quarters, and sports facilities. It had a paved apron for its hangars, and the landing ground composed of a grass airstrip. On 3 September, 1941, the Central Flying School arrived at RAF Norton from Belvedere Airport. On 20 May, 1942, the Central Flying School was renamed to the No. 33 Flying Instructors' School. It provided training for experienced pilots becoming qualified instructors, where they would return to other RATG airfields to teach new trainees afterwards. The unit trained on almost-all aircraft within the scheme, which included the North American Harvard, Tiger Moth, Airspeed Oxford, and Fairchild Cornell. On 9 May, 1944, the No. 33 FIS was renamed to the Central Flying School. On 14 December, 1944, an order was given for the closure of RAF Norton as training station, and the Central Flying School was subsequently relocated to RAF Cranborne. The unit was disbanded on 9 October, 1945.

=== Post-war ===
After World War II, RAF Norton was taken over by a school, which is now known as a Dudley Hall Primary School. The runway was still used up until the late 1970s. The entire landing ground had been fully redeveloped with houses by the 2000s. Today, around 18 of the original station buildings still exist, and all three hangars have since been demolished.

== See also ==
The other two stations in the Mashonaland region:

- Belvedere Airport
- RAF Cranborne
