= Hillside Dams =

Hillside Dams Conservancy
- Hillside Dams, Conservancy
- IUCN category III (natural monument or feature)
- Interactive map of Hillside Dams Conservancy
- Location: Hillside, Bulawayo, Zimbabwe
- Nearest city: Bulawayo
- Area: Hillside, Bulawayo
- Established: 1924
- Governing body: National Museums and Monuments of Zimbabwe
- Website: https://www.hillsidedams.com

Hillside Dams also called Hillside Dams Conservancy is a national monument of Zimbabwe located in the city of Bulawayo.

== History ==
The Hillside Dams area history dates back to the Stone Age as there were various Stone Age tools and rock shelters discovered within the area. In the 19th century it was one of King Lobengula's favourite villages to relax at. In 1895 Rhodesian workers started constructing infrastructure for commercial water supply. It was then that the name Hillside Dams was adopted after completion of the structures in 1898. Unfortunately the structure collapsed.

In 1924 the Hillside Dams were sold to Bulawayo City Council, and the dams for water supply were changed. Thereafter the area became a low density residential suburb known as Hillside. In 1942 Hillside Dams was designated as a National Monument.

== Features ==
=== Flora ===
The woodland vegetation of Hillside Dams is mainly dominated by Terminalia, Acacia, Burkea, Sclerocarya and Peltophorum. In addition to these trees, the area supports a diverse array of plants including various shrubs, grasses, and flowering species that contribute to the rich biodiversity. The ecosystem also hosts a variety of fungi and mushrooms, which play a crucial role in nutrient cycling and supporting the health of the woodland. The trees are labelled by numbers and you can refer somewhere to the meanings of the numbers. There is also an Aloe Garden with different types of Aloe.

=== Fauna ===
Hillside Dams is a proclaimed bird sanctuary, but has few mammals.

=== Geology ===
The dominant rock in the area is Syenite. There are a lot of kopjes and scattered rock boulders.

== Recreational Activities ==
- Canoeing
- Ziplining
- Barbecuing
- Fishing
- Nature Walk
- Picnics
- Cycling
- Running/Jogging
- Birding
