= RAF Kumalo =

Former Royal Air Force base in Zimbabwe

RAF Kumalo
- Khumalo, Bulawayo in Zimbabwe
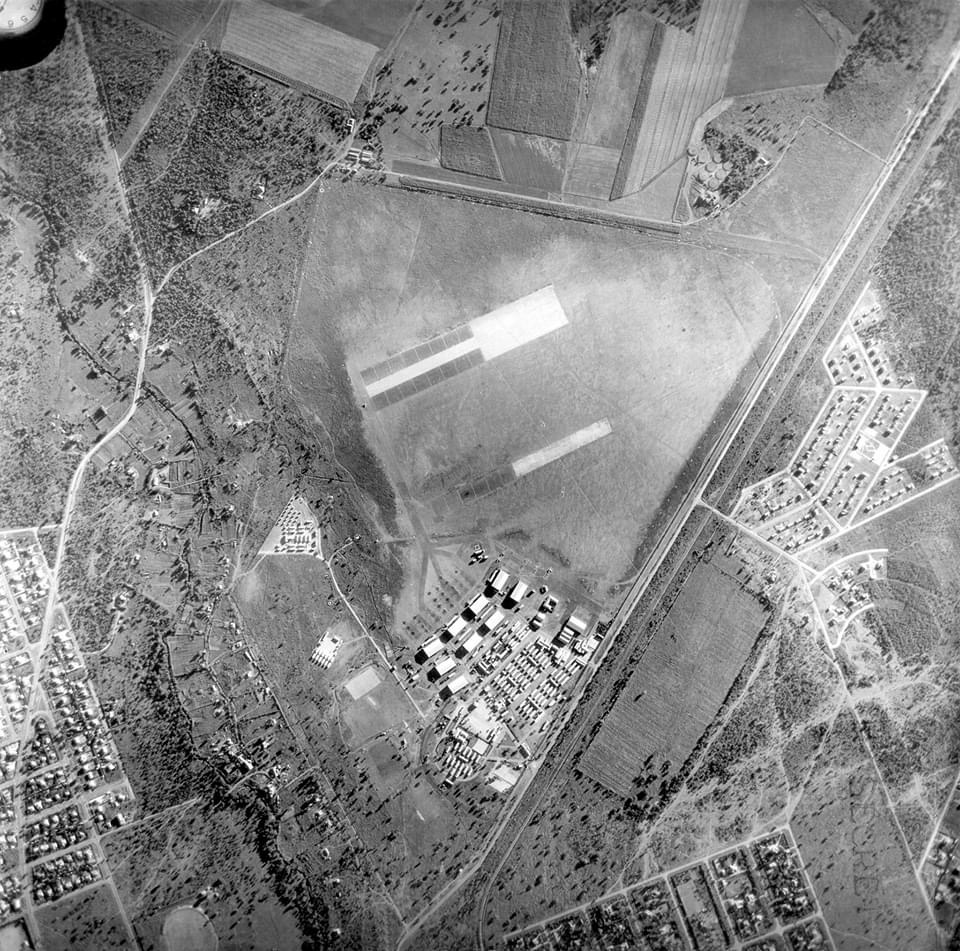
- Aerial photograph of RAF Kumalo sometime taken in the 1940s.

Site information
- Owner: Air Ministry
- Operator: Royal Air Force
- Controlled by: Rhodesian Air Training Group

Location
- Shown within Zimbabwe
- Coordinates: 20°08′11″S 28°36′21″E

Site history
- Built: 1940
- In use: 1940 - 1959

Airfield information
Runways
Direction	Length and surface
E/W	1,400 metres (4,593 ft) Asphalt
N/S	1,065 metres (3,494 ft)

Royal Air Force Kumalo or more simply RAF Kumalo, and later known as Khumalo Airport, was a World War II Royal Air Force station located in Khumalo, Bulawayo, Southern Rhodesia (now Zimbabwe). It was established in 1940 as part of the Rhodesian Air Training Group under the Empire Air Training Scheme. It provided flight training to Commonwealth pilot cadets from 1940 until disbandment in 1945.

== History ==
RAF Kumalo was established in 1940 as part of the broader Empire Air Training Scheme. On 8 October, 1940, the No. 21 Flying Training School (FTS) arrived. The airfield was equipped with maintenance facilities such as hangars, workshops, which serviced aircraft and equipment. Two bombing ranges were also established near Bulawayo, named Mias and Myelbo from the expression "I don’t know Mias from Myelbo." RAF Kumalo operated alongside the nearby smaller RAF Induna, providing advanced pilot training such as instrument and formation flying, bombing practice, and navigation, which were proceeded following training at RAF Induna. A satellite bush airfield located at Woollandale was also used for flight training, and bombing practice would be conducted at Miasi and Mielbo. The station was equipped with a single concrete runway, which was surrounded by urban hazards including a cemetery at one end, and a sewage farm at the other. Cadets usually logged around 300 hours before receiving wings and commissions, and were commonly instructed on de Havilland DH.82A Tiger Moth and Airspeed Oxford aircraft. By 1943, RAF Kumalo had become congested with training aircraft performing takeoffs, landing and practice circuit maneuvers. To manage traffic, several grass relief landing grounds were established outside Bulawayo in 1944. However, instructors and pupils competed to be the first to arrive at the relief strip, as they could fly at low level and chase away ostriches from the strip.

=== Post-war ===
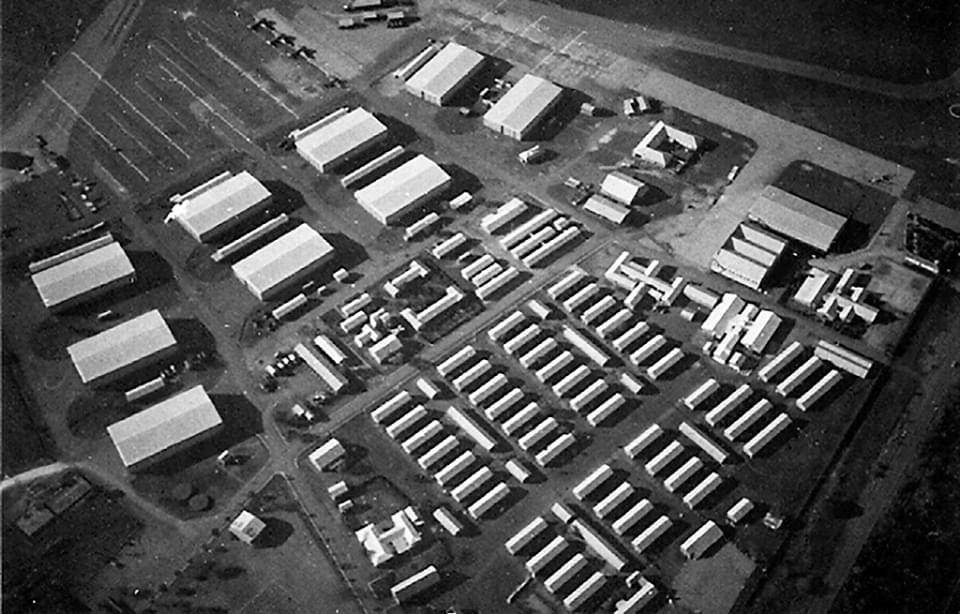
Oblique photograph showing the extensive facilities of RAF Kumalo.

Following World War II, RAF Kumalo remained in operated alongside civil operations. In January 1946, the Initial Training Wing was reformed at RAF Kumalo, and was redesignated as the Air Training Wing, Southern Rhodesia on 1 December, 1946. By April 1947, the unit was redesignated as the Rhodesian Air Training Wing. Two companies were based at Khumalo Airport by 1947; Commercial Air Services Ltd. equipped with one Fairchild UC.61K for charter flights and Flyers Ltd. equipped with two Piper JCC65s and two Tiger Moths providing charter flights and flying instructions. Kumalo Airport served as Bulawayo's first principal civil airport. By the mid-1950s, Khumalo Airport was unable to cater the city's growing needs, and construction of a larger airport began in 1956. In 1958, Joshua Mqabuko Nkomo International Airport opened and Khumalo Airport was closed in January 1959. After closure, the former Kumalo Airport was turned into the James McNeillie Circuit, which operated from 1961 until closure in 1971.

== Units ==
The following units that were based at RAF Kumalo:

Royal Air Force

- No. 21 Flying Training School, 8 October 1940 — 18 May 1945

== Accidents and incidents ==
- In 1943, an Oxford with two pupils had not returned to RAF Kumalo after a routine cross country exercise. At the time, Oxfords were not equipped with radio and by nightfall, no message was received by landline. Subsequently, all serviceable aircraft were made available by morning, and square searches and crew briefs commenced. The missing aircraft was not discovered until late in the day, and was found having run out of fuel and landed on the bed of a dried up salt lake. The Oxford was found with no sight of the crew, and fuel was flown in to refuel the aircraft and fly it back to the station. Following the discovery, the incident was managed by the British South Africa Police, with enquiries and searches locating fragments of clothing. It was reported that the two crew members had been killed by the natives living in grass huts near the lake, fearing that they would be caught and arrested for killing the local protected species for food.
- In c.1943, a Tiger Moth piloted by Station Medical Officer Major McNeight rolled onto its back on takeoff from a relief strip assigned to RAF Kumalo. Despite the incident, he was unharmed and continued routine inspections.

== See also ==
- RAF Induna
- RAF Heany
- RAF Guinea Fowl
- Southern Rhodesia in World War II
