= RAF Cranborne =

Former Royal Air Force base in Zimbabwe

RAF Cranborne
- Harare in Zimbabwe
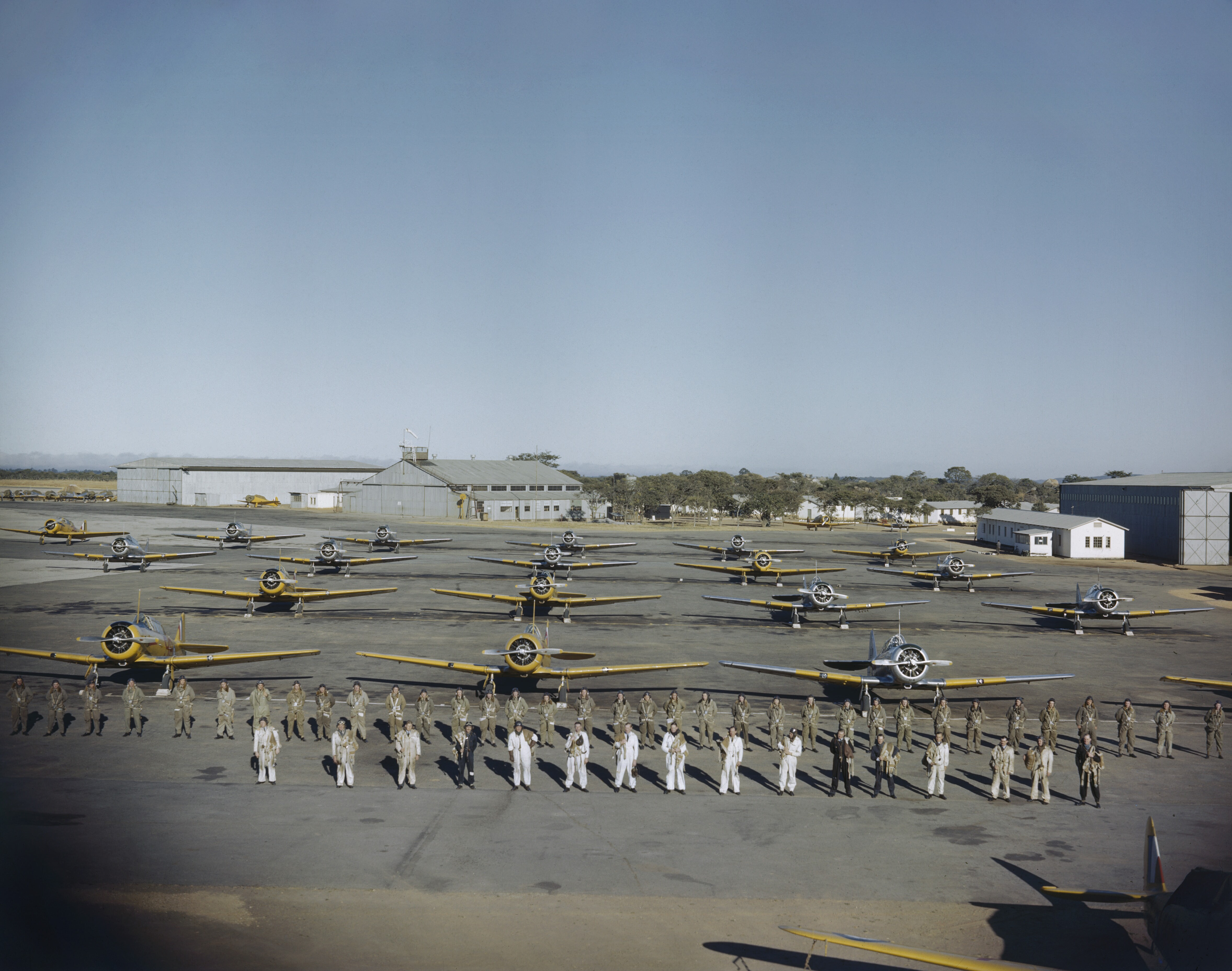
- Sixteen instructors (front row) and pupils parade with North American Harvard aircraft in January 1943.

Site information
- Owner: Air Ministry
- Operator: Royal Air Force
- Controlled by: Rhodesian Air Training Group

Location
- Shown within Zimbabwe
- Coordinates: 17°51′04″S 31°04′22″E

Site history
- Built: December 1937; 88 years ago
- In use: 1940 - 1947

Royal Air Force Cranborne or more simply RAF Cranborne, also known as Cranborne Aerodrome and Hillside, was a World War II Royal Air Force station located in Harare, Southern Rhodesia (now Zimbabwe). It was established in 1940 as part of the Rhodesian Air Training Group under the Empire Air Training Scheme. It provided flight training to Commonwealth pilot cadets from 1940 until deactivation in 1947.

== History ==
In December 1937, Hillside Air Station and a flying school was established for the Southern Rhodesian Air Unit. Two runways were built, and the airfield was equipped with hangars, workshops, offices, and was inspected by Colonel J. S. Morris, then commanding the Southern Rhodesia Forces. In 1939, Hillside Air Station was renamed to Cranbourne, with the spelling later revised to Cranborne. It was equipped with 4 Hawker Harts, 8 Tiger Moths of various types, and one de Havilland Dragon Rapide, with the acquisition of aircraft organised by the local Bulawayo Flying Club. It also assisted in providing flying instructors.

The Empire Air Training Scheme was officially activated on 23 January, 1940, at RAF Cranborne with the establishment of the No. 20 Service Flying Training School (SFTS), and the station began operating under the Rhodesian Air Training Group (RATG). The instructors were initially equipped with four serviceable Hawker Hart biplanes, one Hawker Audax, eight serviceable De Havilland Tiger Moths, one Tiger Moth undergoing maintenance, and two de Havilland Hornet Moths. However, aircraft accommodation became an issue as aircraft were consistently packed into one end of a hangar, with the remainder being used as sleeping quarters. In 1940, there were 137 officers with 16 aircraft available for training at RAF Cranborne. By late 1940, RAF Cranborne and Thornhill were used to train single-engined pilots and fighter-pilots. Aircraft commonly flown included the North American T-6 Texan, and the Airspeed Oxford. The Initial Training Wing for pilot trainees was based in the station, and provided preliminary ground training before moving on to service flying schools. By September 1943, the No. 20 SFTS had a relief landing ground at New Martinsthorpe, another at Sebastopol by April 1943, Hienzani by 7 September 1943. On 14 December, 1944, training operations at RAF Norton were relocated to RAF Cranborne after the station was deactivated. The No. 31 Aircraft Repair Depot was based at the station, which provided maintenance support to training aircraft. The unit was also equipped with a NA Harvard for communications work. By September 1945, it had a relief landing ground at Inkomo.

=== Post-war ===
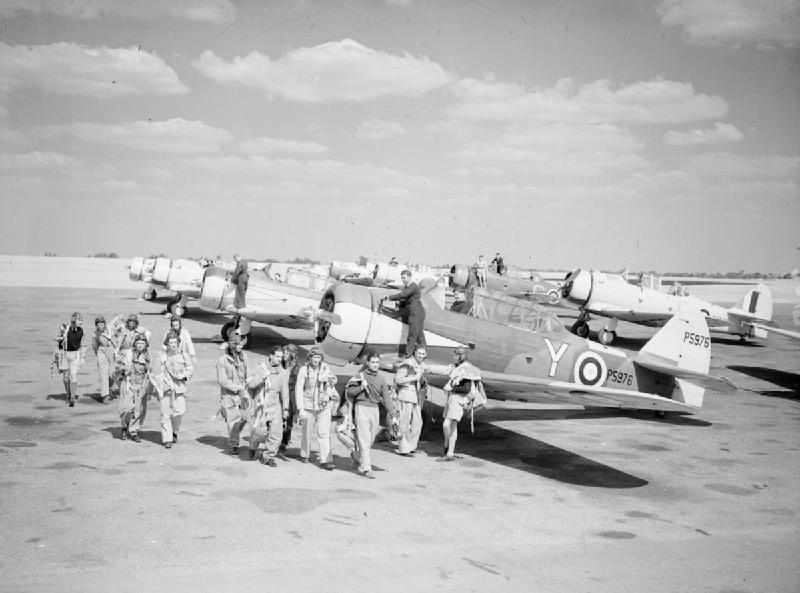
Trainee pilots at No. 20 Service Flying Training School, Cranborne, walk to North American Harvard Mark Is for their training flights.

In 1947, RAF Cranborne was deactivated and the airfield began operating as the principal Southern Rhodesian Air Force base from 28 November, 1947, hosting multiple Supermarine Spitfire squadrons. The barracks, which was once used by Commonwealth airmen, was converted into a hostel by the 1950s. A communications squadron was also established at Cranborne, initially equipped with Leopard Moth SR22 aircraft. On 22 March, 1951, 10 out of the 11 ordered Spitfire aircraft arrived at Cranborne, with the 11th arriving on April 7 of that year. The rapid post-war expansion of Salisbury led to the airfield's closure in 1952, when New Sarum Air Base (now Manyame Air Base) opened. Subsequently, the No. 1 Squadron was relocated to New Sarum where it was re-organized as the No. 3 Transport Squadron.

=== Closure ===
Following closure, the former airfield was used as an immigrants' transit centre and also as a storage depot for the Public Works Department. The site of the former airfield was redeveloped and today, the Cranborne Barracks now partially occupies the site. The hangars and the ancillary facilities still remain visible in satellite imagery.

== Units ==
The following units that were based at RAF Cranborne:

Royal Air Force

- No. 20 Service Flying Training School, 10 July 1940 - 7 September 1945
- No. 31 Aircraft Repair Depot, 1 August 1941

== Accidents & incidents ==
- On 28 January, 1941, a North American T-6 Texan piloted by Sgt Roy Charles Pedley (21) crashed after climbing too steeply into cloud, causing the aircraft to stall and enter an unrecoverable spin from which he was unable to pull out as he was flying too low. Following his death, RATG instructions began forbidding formation flying below 1,000 ft, and pilots were also told that aircraft should avoid entering cloud when possible. Pedley was buried in the CWGC Harare (Pioneer) Cemetery.
- In February 1941, Sgt Ian Jenkinson (23) was unable to take-off from RAF Cranborne in a North American T-6 Texan while simultaneously attempting to close the cockpit canopy and struggling to hear what his instructor was telling him. As the aircraft lifted at the end of the runway, it flew into the trees and caught aflame. The pilot was killed, and the instructor had survived, who was an Air Force Cross recipient with 5,000 hours of flying time. Jenkinson was buried in the CWGC Harare (Pioneer) Cemetery.

== See also ==
- RAF Heany
