= Belvedere Airport =

Former airport in Harare, Zimbabwe

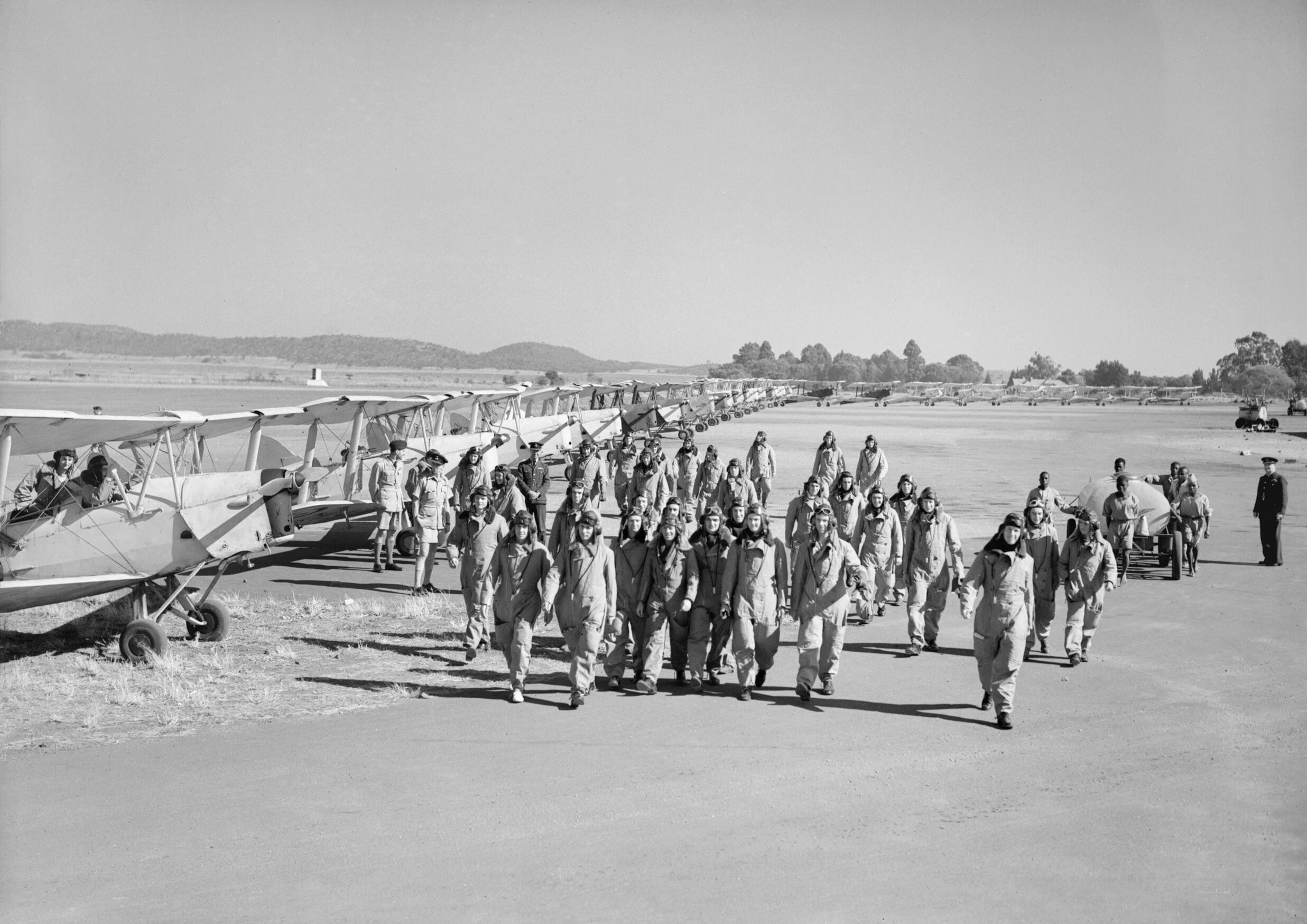
- Trainee pilots walk past their De Havilland Tiger Moth trainers at No. 25 Elementary Flying Training School (Southern Rhodesia), at Belvedere Airport, Salisbury.
- IATA: none; ICAO: none

Summary
- Airport type: Defunct
- Serves: Salisbury
- Opened: 1932; 94 years ago
- Closed: December 31, 1957
- Passenger services ceased: 1957
- Coordinates: 17°50′25.1″S 31°0′21.6″E

Map
- Location in Zimbabwe

Belvedere Airport, also known as Salisbury Aerodrome and Salisbury Municipal Aerodrome, was an airport that served Salisbury (now Harare) located in Southern Rhodesia. It was established in 1932 and was closed in 1957 after being replaced by Robert Gabriel Mugabe International Airport. Following closure, the airport was converted into an airfield racing circuit for the first Rhodesian Grand Prix in 1960, and was used until 1974.

== History ==
In 1932, Salisbury Municipal Aerodrome was established, and Benjamin Roxburgh-Smith was appointed as the first superintendent of the airport. In 1933, Imperial Airways transmitted the first radio broadcast in the country from the aerodrome. In August 1936, the first Southern Rhodesia International Air Rally was held at Salisbury Municipal Aerodrome, which saw participation from the Royal Air Force and the South African Air Force. In November 1935, the Southern Rhodesia Staff Corps Air Unit was established at the aerodrome. On 24 May, 1940, the No. 25 Elementary Flying Training School was established at the aerodrome, as part of the Rhodesian Air Training Group (RATG) under a broader Empire Air Training Scheme. The unit was the first to be established in Southern Rhodesia, followed by a service school at RAF Cranborne and another EFTS unit based at RAF Induna in Bulawayo. On 25 May, 1940, the airport was officially declared as the Belvedere Air Station, and became the headquarters for the RATG. In June 1941, the Southern Rhodesian Air Force Meteorological Service was established at Belvedere Air Station, and provided weather information to pilots and instruction to navigators.

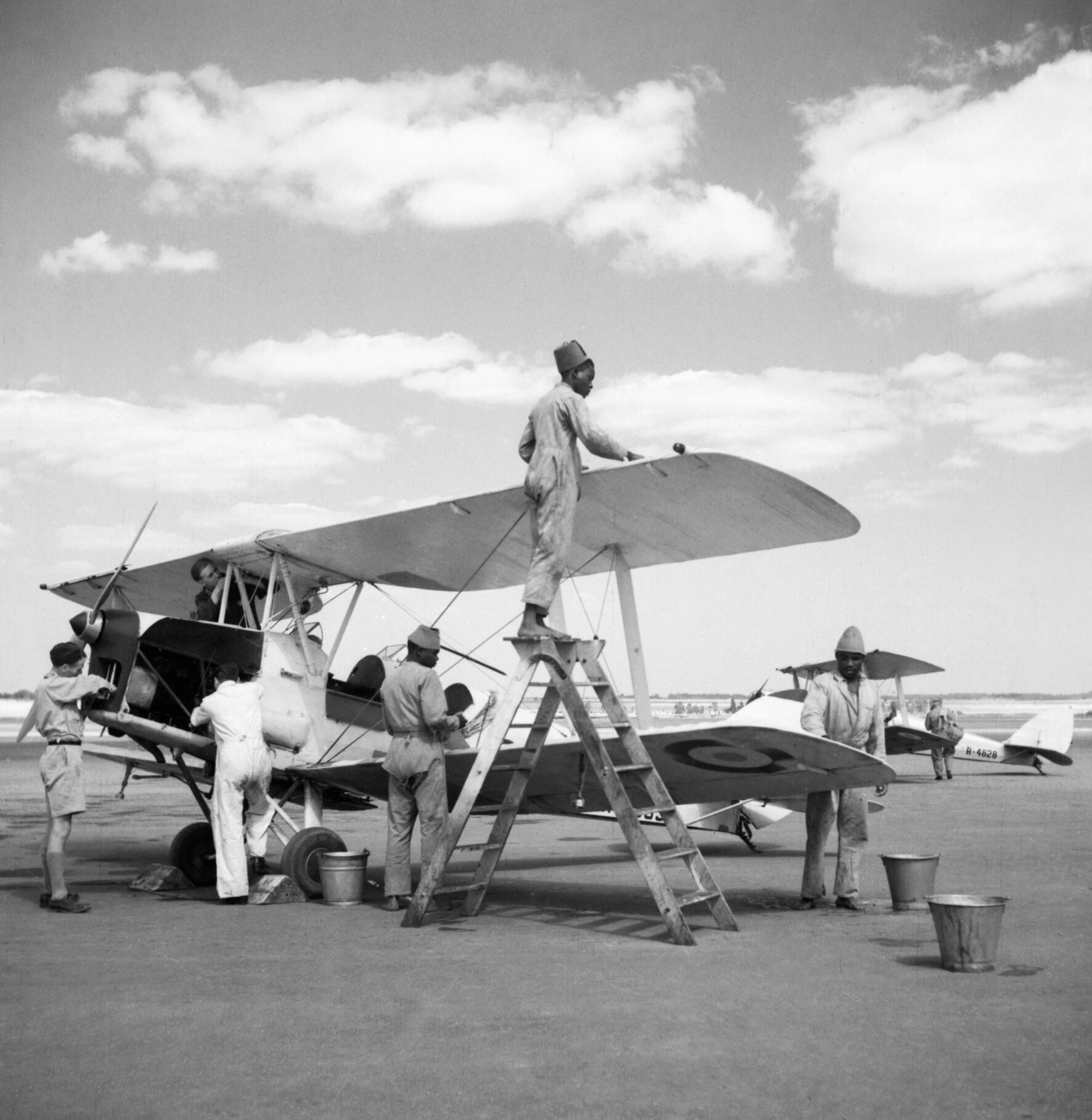
RAF Mechanics attend to the engine of a De Havilland Tiger Moth at No. 25 Elementary Flying Training School, Belvedere Airport, Salisbury, while local employees clean the aircraft.

=== Post-war ===
Following World War II, the aerodrome reopened for civil operations as Belvedere Airport. From 1946 until 1956, the airport served as the main base for flag carrier Central African Airways. By 1946, Rhodesia Aircraft Maintenance and Services Ltd. were based at the airport, which provided maintenance, charter and instruction services. It was equipped with two Auster aircraft and three De Havilland Tiger Moths. On 16 February, 1948, Prime Minister Sir Godfrey Huggins visited the airport, and inspected the No. 44 (Rhodesia) Squadron upon arrival via formation. After the arrival, the squadron remained for a 2-day rest period, and a government dinner followed in the evening. By 1950, Belvedere Airport had become inadequate due to multiple reasons. The reasons included that the runway was 45° out of alignment, making approaching aircraft having to enter through a gap in Warren Hills, and because of a skewed align, aircraft were often forced to take-off over the city centre, which was undergoing a growing number of high-rise buildings in the city. Belvedere Airport was also equipped with inadequate facilities originally built for military use; making it unsuitable for commercial service. The new Salisbury Airport was opened on 5 February, 1957, thus replacing the Belvedere Airport. On 31 December, 1957, the airport was closed.

=== Belvedere circuit ===
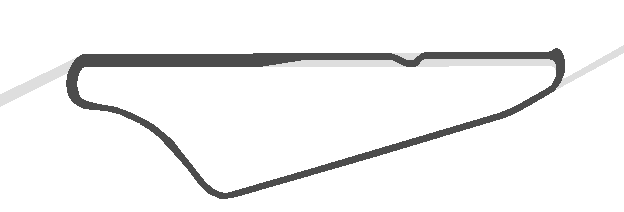
Layout of the Belvedere Airport Circuit used in 1960

In 1959, the remains of Belvedere Airport was converted into a 3.219 km long triangular-shaped circuit. The course featured two straight stretches called the Pichanie Straight and the Back Straight, and races were held clockwise. The Pichanie Straight ran along the former runway, and a chicane was later introduced along it, which reduced speed and improved overall safety. Grid formation for races were 4-3-4-3, and the circuit was considered as an excellent driver's course by contemporary drivers. On 3 July, 1960, the Salisbury Motor Cycle and Light Car Club held a motor race meeting at the circuit.

On 14 August, 1960, the Rhodesian Grand Prix was held at Belvedere Airport, which was attended by a crowd of 10,000. On the same day, the Junior Grand Prix, a production car race and a motorcycle race were also held. Price money of the day totalled almost E2,000, and the Grand Prix was won by South African Champion Syd van der Vyver, who drove a Cooper T43 equipped with an Alfa Romeo engine. Doug Serrurier came second in a Cooper T45, and Dr Dave Wright came third in a Cooper T43. On 4 December, 1960, the December Handicap was held at Belvedere circuit. The circuit was closed in 1974.

== Units ==
The following units that were based at Belvedere Air Station:

Royal Air Force

- No. 25 Elementary Flying Training School, 24 May 1940 — 16 November 1945
- Rhodesian Air Training Group HQ, 25 May 1940

Southern Rhodesian Air Force

- Communications Flight, 14 May 1940 — 1 January 1946
