= List of British Commonwealth Air Training Plan facilities in Southern Rhodesia =

This article contains a list of the Southern Rhodesian facilities forming part of Joint Air Training Scheme which was a major programme for training South African Air Force, Royal Air Force and Allied air crews during World War II. However, RAF Training units would still be based in this country until a decade after the war had finished

A war-time Elementary Flying Training School (EFTS) gave a recruit 50 hours of basic aviation instruction on a simple trainer like the Tiger Moth. Pilots who showed promise went on to training at a Service Flying Training School (SFTS). The Service Flying Training School provided advanced training for pilots, including fighter and multi-engined aircraft. Other trainees went on to different specialties, such as Wireless, navigation or bombing and air gunnery. Trainees in Southern Rhodesia came from Rhodesia, Britain, South Africa, Australia, Greece, and Yugoslavia.

From 1940 thousands of black men were conscripted by the colonial government to build airfields across Southern Rhodesia. They were paid at less than the rates available to farm workers. This led to widespread attempts to avoid this form of forced labour.

== During World War II ==
These are the units that formed the Rhodesia Air Training Group.

Unit Name/No.	Base	Major types of aircraft	Role	Opened	Disbanded	Comments
No. 25	Belvedere, Salisbury	Tiger Moth, Cornell & Harvard	EFTS	24 May 1940	16 November 1945	
No. 20	Cranborne, Salisbury	Harvard 1, 2, 2a, 3 and Oxford	SFTS	10 July 1940	7 September 1945	
No. 27	Induna, Bulawayo	Tiger Moth & Cornell	EFTS	28 January 1940	21 September 1945	
No. 23	Heany, Bulawayo	Oxford	SFTS	8 July 1941	30 September 1945	
No. 21	Kumalo, Bulawayo	Oxford	SFTS	8 October 1940	18 May 1945	
	Sauerdale, Bulawayo	Tiger Moth	EFTS			Planned, but base found to be unsuitable
No. 26	Guinea Fowl, Gwelo	Tiger Moth & Cornell	EFTS	August 1940	14 August 1945	
No. 22	Thornhill, Gwelo	Harvard 1, 2, 2a, 3	SFTS	25 March 1941	30 September 1945	
No. 24 Bombing, Gunnery and Navigation	Moffat, Gwelo	Battle, Oxford and Anson	BGTS	12 May 1943	13 April 1945	
No. 24 Combined Air Observation School	Moffat, Gwelo	Battle, Oxford and Anson	BGTS	3 August 1941	12 May 1943	Split into 24 BGTS & 29 EANS
No. 29 Elementary Navigation School	Moffat, Gwelo	Battle, Oxford and Anson	ANS	12 May 1943	13 April 1945	
No. 28	Mount Hampden	Tiger Moth, Cornell & Harvard	EFTS	1 April 1941	30 October 1945	Motto: Pana Maziñana ano Bururuka - Here Fledglings Take Wing
No. 31	Cranborne	Harvard (for Comms)	ARU	1 August 1941		
No. 32	Heany	Harvard (for Comms)	ARU	1 August 1941		
Rhodesian Central Flying School	Norton	All types used in Group	CFS	3 Sep 1941	20 May 1942	Renamed 33 FIS
No. 33	Norton	All types used in Group	FIS	20 May 1942	9 May 1944	Renamed CFS (SR)
Central Flying School (Southern Rhodesia)	Norton	All types used in Group	CFS	9 May 1944	9 October 1945	
Communications Flight	Belvedere	Tiger Moths, Cornells & Harvards	Comms Flt	14 May 1940	1 January 1946	SRAF unit

=== Training aircraft ===
- Airspeed Oxford
- North American Harvard
- Tiger Moth
- Avro Anson
- Fairey Battle
- Fairchild Cornell

=== Glossary ===
- ANS — Air Navigation School
- ARU — Aircraft Repair Unit
- BGTS — Bombing and Gunnery Training School
- CFS — Central Flying School
- EFTS — Elementary Flying Training School
- FIS — Flying Instructors School
- SFTS — Service Flying Training School
- SRAF — Southern Rhodesia Air Force

== After World War II ==
Unit Name/No.	Base	Major types of aircraft	Opened	Disbanded	Comments
No. 4 FTS	RAF Heany	Tiger Moth (until replaced by Chipmunk), Harvard, Anson	1 February 1947	26 January 1954	
No. 5 FTS	RAF Thornhill	Tiger Moth (until replaced by Chipmunk), Harvard, Anson	23 April 1947 22 January 1951	4 January 1948 30 December 1953	
No. 3 ANS	RAF Thornhill	Anson	5 January 1948	28 September 1951	formed from elements of both 4 & 5 FTS
No. 394 MU	RAF Heany		1 September 1947	31 March 1954	
No. 395 MU	RAF Bulawayo		1 September 1947	31 March 1954	
RATG Communications Squadron	RAF Kumalo	Ansons, Chipmunks & Harvards	1 September 1947	31 March 1954	

For clarification; No.4 FTS & No.5 FTS initially functioned as complete Flying Training Schools with all three/four types at two different bases. After a short period, No.5 FTS was disbanded / redesignated as No.3 ANS specialising in Navigation training, sending all Tiger Moths & Harvards across to join No.4 FTS, and in return receiving No.4 FTS Ansons to add to its own. Three years later in 1951 the situation was reversed with the dissolution of No.3 ANS.

=== Training aircraft ===
- North American Harvard
- Tiger Moth
- Avro Anson
- de Havilland Canada DHC-1 Chipmunk

=== Glossary ===
- ANS — Air Navigation School
- FTS — Flying Training School
- MU — Maintenance Unit
- RATG — Rhodesian Air Training Group

== See also ==
- List of British Commonwealth Air Training Plan facilities in Australia
- List of British Commonwealth Air Training Plan facilities in Canada
- List of British Commonwealth Air Training Plan facilities in South Africa
- Aircrew brevet
- Ernest Lucas Guest
- Charles Warburton Meredith
