= Nesbitt Castle =

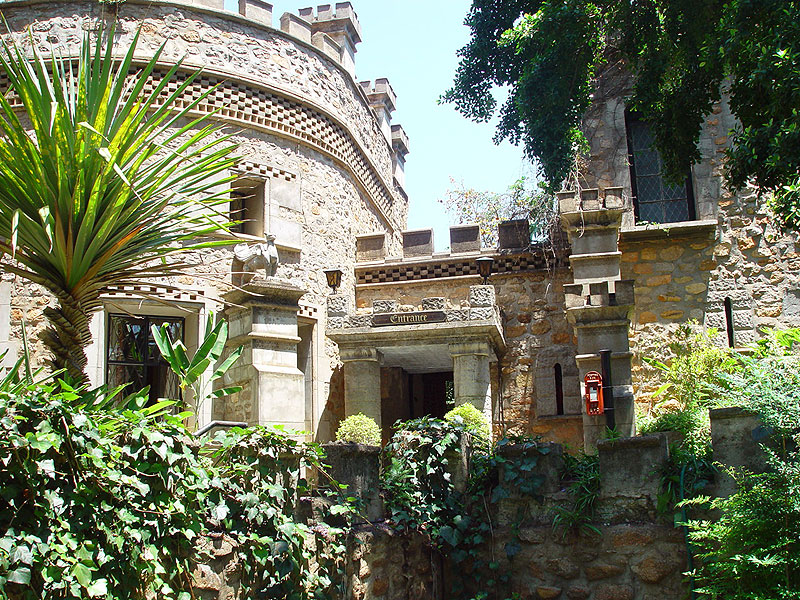

- Location in Zimbabwe
- Former names: Holdengarde Castle

General information
- Status: Completed
- Type: Castle
- Architectural style: Neo-gothic
- Location: Bulawayo, Zimbabwe
- Coordinates: 20°11′14″S 28°37′15″E
- Named for: Theodore Holdengarde; Digby Nesbitt
- Renovated: August 1990
- Owner: Digby Nesbitt

Technical details
- Grounds: 16 acres (0.065 km^{2})

Website
- nesbittcastle.co.zw Nesbitt Castle on Facebook Nesbitt Castle on Twitter

Nesbitt Castle, formerly Holdengarde Castle, is a 20th-century neo-gothic castle near Bulawayo, Zimbabwe. It was built by businessman Theodore Holdengarde in the 1920s.

== Construction ==
Theodore Albert Edward Holdengarde (born Theodore Garde, 1878–1947 (Note: Another source gives his date of birth as 1877)) was a South African-born man of British descent who ran a successful construction business and was mayor of Bulawayo in 1938 and 1940. Arriving in Southern Rhodesia between 1908 and 1910, he bought 100 acres of land outside Bulawayo and constructed the castle over a period of time. Inspired by medieval romanticism, the owner worked on the castle at weekends with a small team, at times demolishing and rebuilding to follow his changing plans.

After the death of Holdengarde in 1947, and his wife in 1967, the castle briefly fell into disrepair before being taken over by their son, Paul, an ex-WWII pilot, who renovated the premises. However, failing health and old age meant that he was unable to maintain the castle and protect it from squatters and arsonists, who burnt down the reception in 1974.

== Current use ==
Soon before his death in 1988, Paul sold the castle to Chiredzi businessman Digby Nesbitt, who led renovation of the castle. The building reopened in 1990 as a luxury hotel. It has been closed as of February 2017 for further renovations following bad weather.

== Filming Location ==
The hotel was used as a filming location for the 1992 film Power of One. Directed and edited by John G. Avildsen, the film stars Stephen Dorff, John Gielgud, Morgan Freeman, Armin Mueller-Stahl, and Daniel Craig.
