= RAF Heany =

Former Royal Air Force base in Zimbabwe

RAF Heany
- Heany, Bulawayo in Zimbabwe
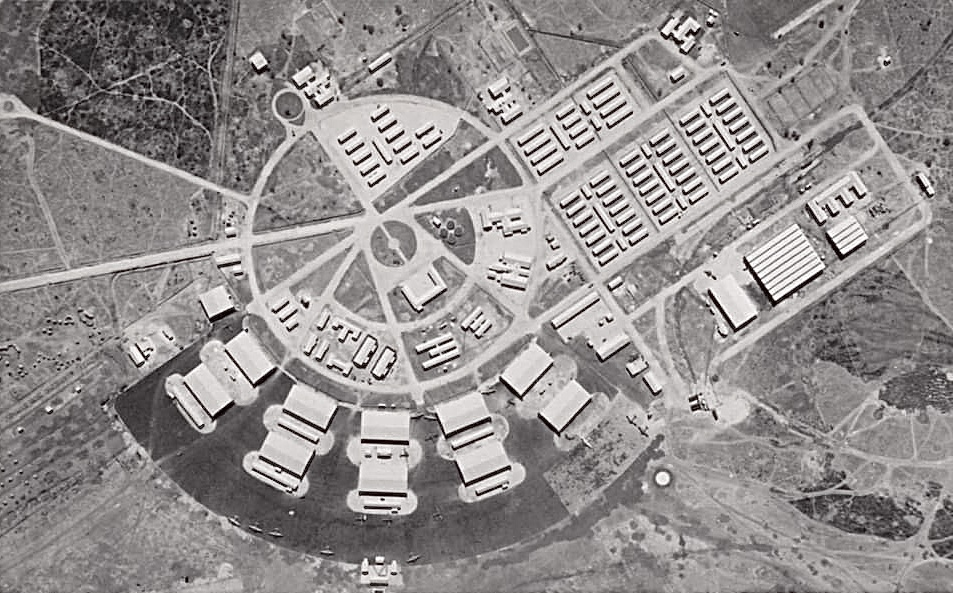
- Aerial view showing the extensive facilities of RAF Heany during the 1940s.

Site information
- Owner: Air Ministry
- Operator: Royal Air Force
- Controlled by: Rhodesian Air Training Group

Location
- Shown within Zimbabwe
- Coordinates: 20°7′49″S 28°46′04″E

Site history
- Built: 1940
- In use: 1940 - 1954

Royal Air Force Heany or more simply RAF Heany, was a World War II Royal Air Force station located in Heany, Bulawayo in Southern Rhodesia (now Zimbabwe). It was established in 1940 as part of the Rhodesian Air Training Group under the Empire Air Training Scheme. It provided flight training to Commonwealth pilot cadets from 1940 until disbandment in 1954.

== History ==
RAF Heany was established in 1940 as part of the broader Empire Air Training Scheme. The original program did not include RAF Heany, however, it was added alongside Mount Hampden. By late 1940, it was organized that RAF Heany alongside the nearby RAF Kumalo would provide training on twin-engine aircraft. On 8 July 1941, the No. 23 Service Flying Training School (SFTS) arrived. The airfield was equipped with maintenance facilities such as hangars, workshops, which held the No. 32 Aircraft Repair Depot and No. 394 Maintenance Unit, servicing aircraft and equipment. Two bombing ranges were also established near Bulawayo, named Mias and Myelbo from the expression "I don’t know Mias from Myelbo." Flying and link-trainer instructors from Greece were also trained and established at the station. RAF Heany had several leisure activities for its personnel, whicn included a golf course, however the lack of rubber led to a shortage of balls. Other sports were held, which included basketball, baseball, softball, miniature rifle shooting and badminton. In 1945, two relief landing grounds were assigned to RAF Heany, which were White's Run by March 1945, and Sauerdale by April 1945. Following World War II, RAF Heany saw limited operations until late 1946.

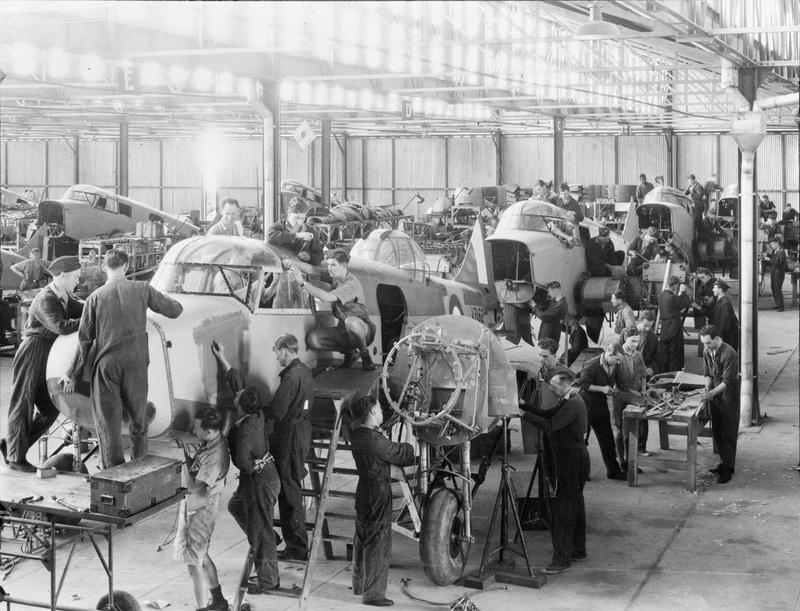
Royal Air Force, the Rhodesian Air Training Group in Southern Rhodesia, 1941-1945. Airspeed Oxford airframes under repair in a hangar at No. 32 Aircraft Repair Depot, Heany

=== Post-war ===
On 1 December 1946, RAF Heany was reactivated for continued training operations, and the Air Training Wing, Southern Rhodesia assumed control of the station from the Rhodesia Air Training Group (RATG). The No. 4 FTS arrived on 1 February 1947, and the station adopted the title No. 4 FTS instead of RAF Station Heany from 23 April 1947. The RATG assumed control of the station from 10 May 1948, until 31 March 1954. The remaining units were either disbanded or withdrawn from the station.

=== Llewellin Barracks ===
After the withdrawal of units in 1954, RAF Heany was closed. The former facilities that were left behind was converted into the Llewellin Barracks, and a training depot of the Royal Rhodesia Regiment was established in October 1955. Trainees underwent four and a half months of training under instructors, and upon completion, trainees were posted to the Territorial Force Units to complete their Peace Training Liability. Today, only 7 out of 10 hangars remain, and the runway has completely overgrown, with remains still visible on satellite imagery.

== Units ==
The following units that were based at RAF Heany:

- No. 23 Service Flying Training School, 8 July 1941 - 30 September 1945
- Advance Party, No 24 Combined Air Observers School, 14 July 1941 - 3 August 1941
- No. 32 Aircraft Repair Depot, 1 August 1941
- No. 4 Flying Training School, 3 February 1947 - 26 January 1954
- No. 6 Mobile Oxygen Unit, c1953
- No. 394 Maintenance Unit, 1 September 1947 - 31 March 1954
- RATG Communications Squadron, 1 September 1947 - 31 March 1954

== Accidents & incidents ==
- An enforcement of regulations prohibited the unauthorized carriage of ground personnel was introduced following an incident after one such passenger, LAC Austin Charles Hearn, was killed when an Airspeed Oxford piloted by a trainee crashed on final approach at RAF Heany. The aircraft's port engine cut out during a turn, causing the starboard powerplant to bank the aircraft to the left. At 40 ft from the ground the engine stalled and the Oxford struck the trees before hitting the ground. The pilot survived the accident, and Hearn was buried in the CWGC Bulawayo (Athlone) Cemetery.
- On 12 May 1942, an Airspeed Oxford from RAF Heany of No. 23 SFTS crashed south of Bulawayo due to a large bird strike, killing all three on board. The pilot was Flt Sgt James Thomas Thackham (24), from Headington, Oxford. The other two airmen were Sgt George Rufus Joslin (20) from Pirbright, Surrey, and Sgt Bernard Martin Franklin (20) from Brighton, Sussex. All three are buried in the CWGC Bulawayo (Athlone) Cemetery.
- On 20 January 1953, a Harvard IIA EX161 registered as MSN 88-9240 of No. 4 FTS was destroyed beyond repair after it crashed from striking cables during a navigational exercise.
- On 3 September 1953, a Harvard IIA EX197 registered as MSN 88-9276 of No. 4 FTS was damaged beyond repair in an accident at RAF Heany.

== See also ==
- RAF Kumalo
- RAF Induna
- Southern Rhodesia in World War II
