= Zimbabwe School of Mines =

Zimbabwean mining school

Location
- Killarney, Bulawayo, Zimbabwe
- 20°8′57.95″S 28°38′37.65″E

Information
- Established: 1926; 100 years ago
- Website: Official website

The Zimbabwe School of Mines is an institution whose mandate is pivotal to the socio-economic development of Zimbabwe. From its inception in 1926 the school has produced competent mining practitioners who are in demand in the SADC region and internationally. The school is located in Killarney, Bulawayo. Zimbabwe School of mines mainly offers qualification in National Diploma and Higher National Diploma in Mining, Mine Geology, Mine Survey, Mining Mineral Processing & Extractive Metallurgy and Metallurgical Assaying. The curriculum constantly is revised and updated with help from mining companies in Zimbabwe and Southern Africa.

== History ==
The Zimbabwe School of Mines was formed by a Presidential Charter in 1994 but had been in existence since 1926 operating from Gifford High School premises. The headmaster of Gifford High School Mr. P.H. Gifford with other like-minded gentlemen opened the Bulawayo Technical School in 1927 with 39 students. The School of Mines was then moved from Gifford High School to be under the Bulawayo Technical School in 1934. The establishment of a Mining Department at the Bulawayo Technical School was a result of the deliberations of a special committee appointed by the Minister of Mines. The committee was mandated ‘to consider the best means of affording technical education and practical training for youths who wished to enter the Mining Industry.’ The scheme also received approval from the then Rhodesia Chamber of Mines, which at that time was headquartered in Bulawayo. The Chamber of Mines ‘considered the move as a necessary provision of technical training for youths for one of the most important industries in the country’. Roland Starkey, who was the mining representative of the school in 1934, prepared a roadmap for starting “The School of Mines” which later became the fully-fledged Mining Department in 1936.

Quote from the Editorial of the Technical School Magazine of November 1934 about the Mining school: “The intention is to provide a measure of theoretical and practical training for boys and youths who intend to take mining as a career, or who are already engaged in the industry, in order that they shall better equip themselves for their life’s work. The beginning will be on modest scale, but the full scheme is flexible and has been so thought out that it will be possible later to build on the foundations thus provide a recognised School of Mines.”

Over the years the Bulawayo Technical School experienced growth and became a technical college in 1952, then a polytechnic in 1988.

In 1994 The Zimbabwe School of Mines moved to the current premises in Killarney after obtaining its own Presidential Charter to run as a separate entity.
