= Bulawayo =

City in Zimbabwe

- City, province, district and central business district
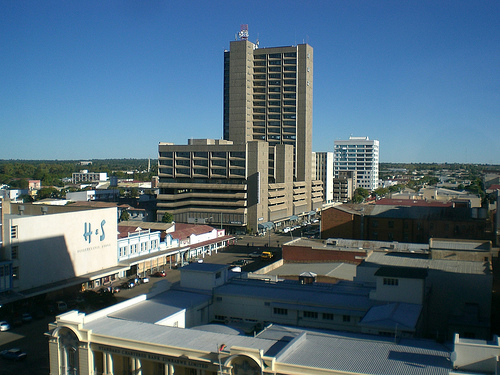
- View of Bulawayo's Central Business District (CBD) from Pioneer House.

- Flag Coat of arms
- Nicknames: 'City of Kings', 'Skies', 'Bompton' or 'Bulliesberg'
- Motto: Si ye phambili (Northern Ndebele) "Let us go forward"
- Bulawayo highlighted in red in Zimbabwe
- Interactive map of Bulawayo
- Coordinates: 20°10′12″S 28°34′48″E
- Country: Zimbabwe
- Province: Bulawayo
- District: Bulawayo
- Settled: 1840
- Incorporated (town): 1897
- Incorporated (city): 1943
- Divisions: 4 districts, 29 wards, 156 suburbs

Government
  - Type: Mayor–council
  - Mayor: David Coltart (CCC)
  - Council: Bulawayo City Council

Area
  - Province: 2,096 km^{2} (809 sq mi)
  - Urban: 95.13 km^{2} (36.73 sq mi)
  - Metro: 643 km^{2} (248 sq mi)
- Elevation: 1,358 m (4,455 ft)

Population (2022 census)
  - Province: 665,952
  - Density: 317.7/km^{2} (822.9/sq mi)
- Time zone: UTC+2 (CAT)
  - Summer (DST): UTC+2 (not observed)
- Area code: 029
- ISO 3166 code: ZW-BU
- HDI (2021): 0.693 medium · 1st of 10
- Website: citybyo.co.zw

Bulawayo (/bʊləˈwɑːjoʊ/, /-ˈweɪoʊ/; Northern Ndebele: Bulawayo) is the second largest city in Zimbabwe, and the largest city in the country's Matabeleland region. The city's population is disputed; the 2022 census listed it at 665,940, while the Bulawayo City Council claimed it to be about 1.2 million. Bulawayo covers an area of 546 square kilometres (211 square miles) in the western part of the country, along the Matsheumhlope River. Along with the capital Harare, Bulawayo is one of two cities in Zimbabwe that are also provinces.

Bulawayo was founded by a group led by Gundwane Ndiweni around 1840 as the kraal of Mzilikazi, the Ndebele king and was known as Gibixhegu. His son, Lobengula, succeeded him in the 1860s, and changed the name to koBulawayo and ruled from Bulawayo until 1893, when the settlement was captured by British South Africa Company soldiers during the First Matabele War. That year, the first white settlers arrived and rebuilt the town. The town was besieged by Ndebele warriors during the Second Matabele War. Bulawayo attained municipality status in 1897, and city status in 1943.

Historically, Bulawayo has been the principal industrial centre of Zimbabwe; its factories produce cars and car products, building materials, electronic products, textiles, furniture, and food products. Bulawayo is also the hub of Zimbabwe's rail network and the headquarters of the National Railways of Zimbabwe.

Bulawayo's central business district (CBD) covers 5.4 km^{2} (2.1 sq mi) in the heart of the city and is surrounded by numerous suburbs. The majority of the city's population belongs to the Ndebele people, with minorities of Shona and other groups, including Coloured and White Zimbabweans. Bulawayo is home to over a dozen colleges and universities, most notably the National University of Science and Technology, Bulawayo Polytechnic College, Zimbabwe School of Mines, Hillside Teachers College, and the United College of Education. The Natural History Museum of Zimbabwe, formerly the National Museum, is located in Bulawayo. The city is close to tourist sites such as Matobo National Park and the Khami World Heritage Site.

== History ==
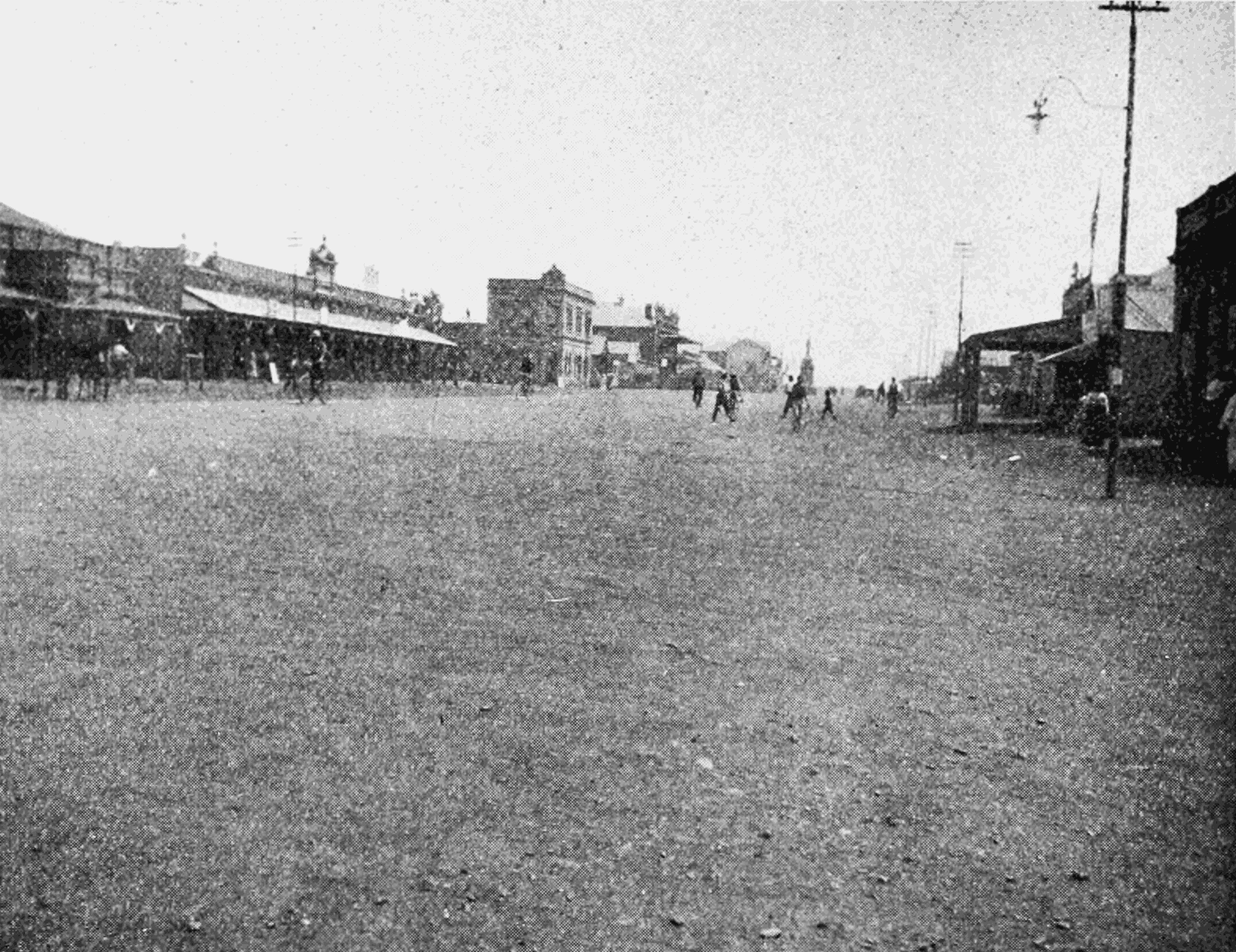
The principal street in Bulawayo in 1905

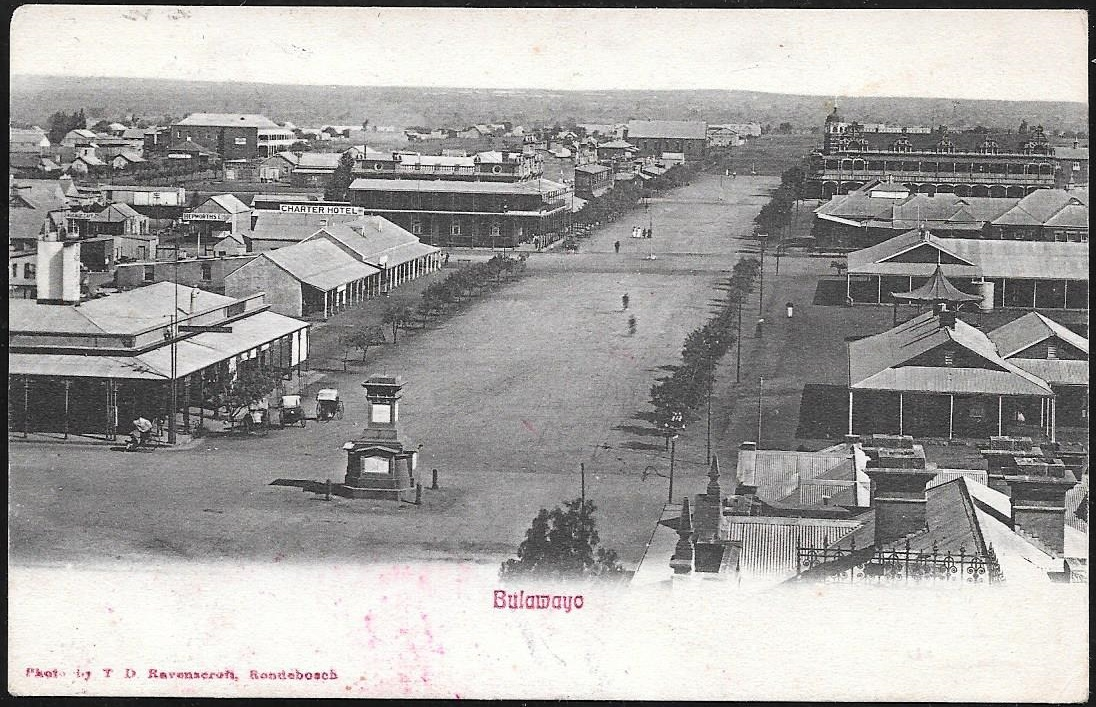
Bulawayo in 1906. At front is the Matabele Rebellion Monument, constructed after the Second Matabele War

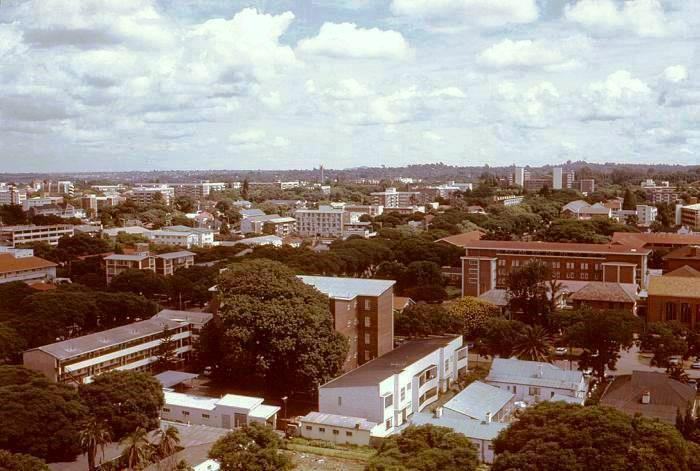
Bulawayo in 1976

The city was founded by the Ndebele king Lobengula, the son of King Mzilikazi, born of Matshobana, who settled in modern-day Zimbabwe around the 1840s. This followed the Ndebele people's great trek from northern Kwazulu. The name Bulawayo comes from the Ndebele word bulala and it translates to "the one to be killed". It is thought that at the time of the formation of the city there was a civil war. Mbiko ka Madlenya Masuku, a trusted confidant of King Mzilikazi and leader of the Zwangendaba regiment, fought Prince Lobhengula as he did not believe that he was the legitimate heir to the throne. This was because Lobhengula was born to a Swazi mother, and Masuku felt that she was of a lesser class.

At the time Lobengula was a prince fighting to ascend his father's throne. It was common at the time for people to refer to Bulawayo as Bulawayo UmntwaneNkosi, "a place where they are fighting or rising against the prince". The city of Bulawayo coincidentally has a similar name to the capital of the great Zulu warrior king Shaka ka Senzangakhona in Kwazulu, where Mzilikazi and his Khumalo clan and other Nguni people came from.

In the 1860s, the city was influenced by European intrigue. Many colonial powers cast covetous eyes on Bulawayo and the land surrounding it because of its strategic location. Britain made skilful use of private initiative in the shape of Cecil Rhodes and the Chartered Company to disarm the suspicion of her rivals. Lobengula once described Britain as a chameleon and himself as the fly.

During the 1893 First Matabele War, British South Africa Company (BSAC) troops invaded and forced King Lobengula to evacuate his followers, after first detonating munitions and setting fire to the town. BSAC troops and white settlers occupied the ruins. On 4 November 1893, Leander Starr Jameson declared Bulawayo a settlement under the rule of the BSAC. Cecil Rhodes ordered the new settlement to be founded on the ruins of Lobengula's royal kraal, a typical action by a conquering power. This is where the State House stands today.

In 1897, the new town of Bulawayo acquired the status of municipality in the British colonial system, and Lt. Col. Harry White was appointed as one of the first mayors.

=== Siege ===
At the outbreak of the Second Matabele War, in March 1896, Bulawayo was besieged by Ndebele forces. The settlers established a laager here for defensive purposes. The Ndebele had experienced the brutal effectiveness of the Maxim guns employed by BSAC troops in the First Matabele War, so they never mounted a significant attack against Bulawayo, although over 10,000 Ndebele warriors gathered to surround the town. Rather than wait passively for attack, the settlers mounted patrols, called the Bulawayo Field Force, under Frederick Selous and Frederick Russell Burnham. These patrols rode out to rescue any surviving settlers in the countryside and attacked the Ndebele. In the first week of fighting, 20 men of the Bulawayo Field Force were killed and 50 were wounded. An unknown number of Ndebele were killed and wounded.

During the siege, conditions in Bulawayo quickly deteriorated. By day, settlers could go to homes and buildings in the town, but at night they were forced to seek shelter in the much smaller laager. Nearly 1,000 women and children were crowded into the small area and false alarms of attacks were common. The Ndebele neglected to cut the telegraph lines connecting Bulawayo to Mafikeng. The settlers and forces appealed for relief, and the BSAC sent additional troops from Salisbury and Fort Victoria (now Harare and Masvingo respectively) 500 kilometres (300 miles) to the north, and from Kimberley and Mafeking 1,000 km (600 mi) to the south. Once the relief forces arrived in late May 1896, the siege was broken. An estimated 50,000 Ndebele retreated into their stronghold of the Matobo Hills near Bulawayo. Not until October 1896 did the Ndebele finally surrender their arms to the BSAC.

=== Modern era ===
By the late 1930s, Bulawayo was no longer the country's biggest city. Influence and activity moved eastwards to the other cities, especially Salisbury, a trend which continues up to the present day. Despite this, after the Second World War, prosperity and population growth revived, as the city became an industrial powerhouse, peaking during the Federal years as new markets opened in Malawi and Zambia. However, Bulawayo trailed the development of other cities notably, Johannesburg, Harare and Cape Town during the same period. In 1940, the Royal Air Force (RAF) launched the Empire Air Training Scheme, and facilitated the construction of multiple bases of the Rhodesian Air Training Group. Bulawayo had ideal conditions, which included having overall flat terrain and being 1,200 meters high in elevation, which made it malaria-free. Three RAF Stations were subsequently established, which included RAF Heany, RAF Kumalo, and RAF Induna, and were all equipped with a hangar and landing ground. Additionally, two bombing ranges were established in the outskirts of Bulawayo, and were named Miasi and Myelbo. In 1943, Bulawayo received city status.

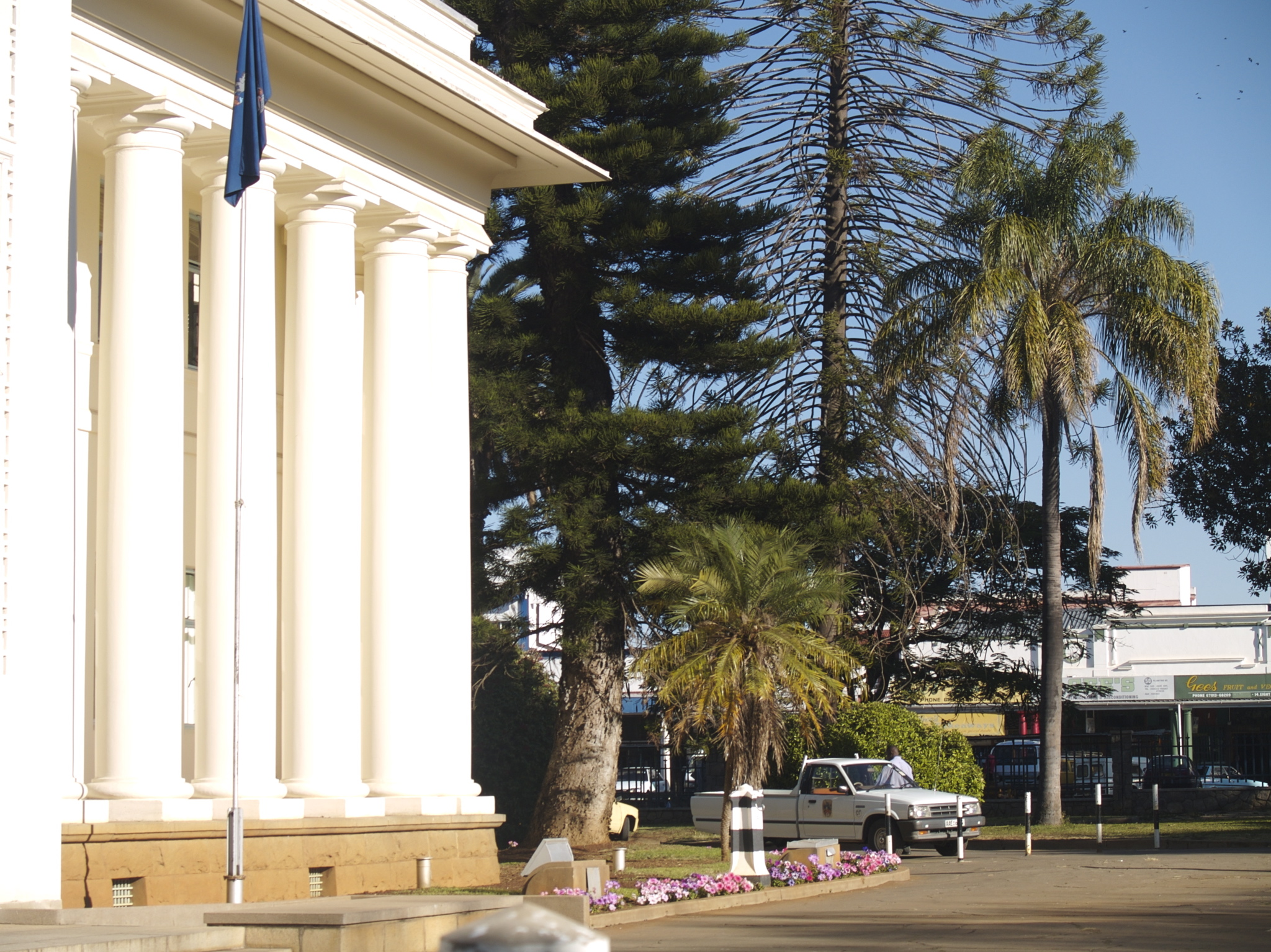
Bulawayo City Hall

Kenilworth Towers, residential flats

By 1992, population decline and slow growth were beginning to occur which disproportionately affected heavy industry. In response, Bulawayo sought to re-invent itself as a 'heritage city', with its wide main streets refurbished and its Victorian architecture and industrial heritage preserved. Institutions such as the Bulawayo Railway Museum and Nesbitt Castle were restored. The city was also recognised as a centre of excellence in tertiary education and research, as the National University of Science and Technology, Zimbabwe was formed and expanded and other colleges growth also accelerated.

Since the late 20th century, Bulawayo has suffered a sharp fall in living standards coinciding with the protracted economic crisis affecting the country. The main challenges the city faces include underinvestment, declining infrastructure, de-industrialisation and the effects of corruption and nepotism. Much of the city's educated workers have migrated south to neighbouring South Africa or further afield to the United Kingdom, Canada and Australia. Public service concerns have become steadily more acute, with particular concern in the health sector from a growing shortage of experienced doctors and nurses. As a result, the city faced an avoidable cholera outbreak in 2008. Though the city is the centre of the southern population generally categorized as the Matebele, the population includes various ethnicities, as well as a small number of expats, mostly from neighbouring countries.

The Central Business District has the widest roads. These were designed to accommodate the ox-drawn carts, and to allow them to make a turn in the street, that were used as a primary means of transport when the town was planned and erected.

Bulawayo is nicknamed the "City of Kings" or "kontuthu ziyathunqa"—a Ndebele phrase for "smoke arising". This name arose from the city's historically large industrial base. The large cooling towers of the coal-powered electricity generating plant situated in the city centre once used to exhaust steam and smoke over the city.

== Suburbs ==
No.	Suburb/location	Origin of name
1	Ascot	Adjoining the Bulawayo Ascot race-course
2	Barbourfields	The suburb was named after a former mayor, H. R. Barbour, who during the colonial era was greatly interested in the welfare of the indigenous people. There is a place called Barbour in Argyll & Bute. Barbour is a Scottish family name, though it was apparently first recorded on the English side of the border, in Cumberland and Northumberland. The father of Scottish vernacular poetry, John Barbour (1320–1395), is best remembered for his epic poem "The Brus", telling the story of King Robert I. The origin of the name is occupational (a cutter of hair as well as an extractor of teeth during the Middle Ages).
3	Barham Green	The suburb was named after two people. The first was a former Bulawayo City Councillor (who later became an Alderman) Mrs. M. E. Barham, M.B.E. and the other was Rev. Rufus Green. They were critical in the establishment of this suburb. During the colonial Rhodesia era, it was designated for the Coloured community.
4	Beacon Hill	Also known as Beryl Drive, reference is made to fact that it is the high point of the suburbs and possesses the areas with the highest marking beacon at its summit.
5	Bellevue	The suburb was named after the estate name. It is sometimes spelled Belle Vuederivedes from the French meaning "beautiful view".
6	Belmont	
7	Belmont Industrial Area	The area was named after a former Bulawayo City Engineer, Mr. Kinmont.
8	Bradfield	The suburb was named after Edwin Eugene Bradfield, a pioneer.
9	Burnside	This area used to be a portion of former town council area and used to be part of Matsheumhlope Farms. The name is derived from the reference to the River Matsheumhlophe. "Burn" is a Scottish and northern English word for a stream.
10	Cement	This was named after the surrounding industrial area, responsible for the making of cement.
11	Cowdray Park	
12	Donnington	
13	Donnington West	
14	Douglasdale	The Douglas family, descendants of William de Douglas (late 12th century), was one of the most powerful in Scotland.
15	Eloana	
16	Emakhandeni	Emakhandeni is the Ndebele name for Fort Rixon, which was the area where the regiment Makhanda were located. Makhandeni is the locative term.
17	Emganwini	Reference is made to the plentiful amarula trees in the vicinity.
18	Emhlangeni	
19	Enqotsheni	
20	Entumbane	This is where King Mzilikazi was buried. It is one of the dozens of high-density suburbs of Bulawayo, commonly referred to as the "Western Suburbs". The first disturbances that led to the Gukurahundi were sparked in Entumbane, hence the term "Impi ye Ntumbane" that refers to the disturbances.
21	Fagadola	
22	Famona	The suburb was named after Famona, one of the daughters of King Lobengula. It means jealousy or envy must end (literally, "die").
23	Fortunes Gate (including Mtaba Moya)	The suburb's name comes from the original property name formerly owned by James Gilchrist Esq, and the gates are those of the original market building.
24	Four Winds	The suburb name comes from the original property name; the first house was on top of a hill.
25	Glencoe	This name is etched into the Scottish psyche as the bleak glen in the Highlands where, in 1692, a party of MacDonald men, women, and children were treacherously massacred by the Campbells, who were acting under government orders.
26	Glengary	The suburb was named after its estate name.
27	Glenville (including Richmond South)	The suburb was named after its estate name.
28	Granite Park	
29	Greenhill	The suburb's name is a reference to scenery and topography.
30	Gwabalanda	Named after a Ndebele chief, Gwabalanda Mathe.
31	Harrisvale	
32	Helenvale	
33	Highmount	
34	Hillcrest	The suburb's name comes from the reference to topography. It is Greenhill's crest.
35	Hillside	The suburb's name is a reference to topography (Greenhill's slope).
36	Hillside South	The suburb's name comes from its position as the south facing slope of Greenhill.
37	Hume Park	"Hume"/"Home" is a Lowland Scottish family name.
38	Hyde Park	The name originates from the large number of residents who trace their ancestry to England.
39	Ilanda	Ndebele name for the egret
40	Iminyela	This is the name of a type of tree common in the area.
41	Intini	The name was given as a commemoration to the Mhlanga family, who originally set out with the Khumalo family under Mzilikazi as gratitude to their contribution to the Ndebele Kingdom, Mthwakazi. The Ntini is the totem of the Mhlanga-Mabuya clan.
42	Jacaranda	This is a reference to the jacaranda trees.
43	Kelvin (Industrial area, includes North East and West)	The area was named in reference to a suburb of Glasgow. It takes its name from the River Kelvin, a tributary of the River Clyde.
44	Kenilworth	The suburb was named after its estate name.
45	Khumalo	The suburb was named after the Royal Clan of the Matabele. The Khumalo hockey stadium is here.
46	Khumalo North	This is a reference to the position of Kumalo suburb.
47	Kilallo	
48	Killarney	It is named after the town of Killarney in County Kerry in southwest Ireland.
49	Kingsdale	Situated along the Joshua Mqabuko National Airport road before the Umguza River. The area mostly consists of farms.
50	Lakeside	Lakeside is the stretch of water at the junction of the Old Essexvale Road and the road to the suburb of Waterford, and then on to Hope Fountain Mission.
51	Lobengula	It is named after the second and last Matabele King, Lobengula.
52	Lobenvale	The suburb's name is derived from a combination of King Lobengula's name and Umguza Valley.
53	Lochview	The suburb's name is in reference to Lakeside Dam and is famous in the city for its large number of Scottish residents and the Scottish-style houses. According to the Bulawayo City Suburb Names website, the suburb was named after Lakeside Dam.
54	Luveve	Named after Ndebele chief Luveve; established in 1935
55	Mabuthweni	The suburb's name means "where the soldiers are"; the name was given in reference to a bachelors' quarters.
56	Magwegwe	The suburb name is named after Magwegwe, who was one of the significant people in King Lobengula's royal Bulawayo town.
57	Magwegwe North	This is a reference to the position relative to that of Magwegwe.
58	Magwegwe West	This is a reference to the position relative to that of Magwegwe.
59	Mahatshula	Mahatshula is named after one of the Ndebele Indunas, Mahatshula Ndiweni.
60	Makokoba	The suburb got its name from the actions of Mr. Fallon, who used walk around with a stick. The name comes from the word "umakhokhoba" which was how the locals referred to Fallon, meaning "the little old man who walks with a stick". The word actually describes the noise of the stick on the ground, ko-ko-ko, or the doors. It is the oldest African dwelling in the city. Political activism was rife in the pre-ZAPU era.
61	Malindela	The suburb was named after the mother of Faluta, who was the mother of Lobengula, i.e., after Lobengula's maternal grandmother.
62	Manningdale	It is named after the developer of the suburb.
63	Marlands	
64	Matsheumhlope	The name comes from the association with the river ("White Stones"). White stones in Ndebele and Zulu proper languages are "amatshe amhlope".
65	Matshobana	The suburb was named after Matshobana, who was a chief of the Khumalo clan and more significantly he was the father of Mzilikazi, the founder of the Ndebele Kingdom.
66	Montgomery	It is named after Bernard Montgomery, 1st Viscount Montgomery of Alamein, a decorated British Army commander.
67	Montrose	The suburb was named by the estate developers, and street names are of many Cotswolds villages and towns.
68	Morningside	
69	Mpopoma	The name comes from a descriptive Ndebele name for the area, which was derived from the sound the Mpopoma River makes when flowing.
70	Munda	The Tonga name for a plot of land on which people would farm
71	Mzilikazi	The suburb was named after the founder of uMthwakazi, King Mzilikazi. It is a stone's throw away from Barbourfields suburb, separated by a road called Ambulance Drive that leads to one of the city's largest hospitals, Mpilo.
72	New Luveve	Reference is made to the suburb Luveve; see Luveve suburb.
73	Newsmansford	
74	Newton	Estate name
75	Newton West	Reference to position (Newton)
76	Nguboyenja	Named after Lobengula's son and heir
77	Njube	Named after one of Lobengula's sons
78	Nketa	It is named after the traditional heritage site of Nketa Hill on which King Lobengula assembled his entire kingdom and in the spirit of nation building, chose a Kalanga wife, MaDumane or Ma Mlalazi and married her. This was against the advice from his Khumalo or Zansi advisers. He then told them that the Kalanga where more than the Khumalos, Ngunis and other clans who came from south of the Limpopo. He stated that it was then important that the broader Mthwakazi society must be inclusive of everyone and it was high time the Kalanga had a Queen from their own clan. At that stage Mthwakazi was divided into three subgroups: the Zansi – the people that Mzilikazi left Kwazulu with, mostly the Khumalo and Ndwandwe clans; the Enhla – mostly Swazi, Ndebele (Mabhena, Mahlangu etc.) and Sotho (Sibanda/Batau, Ngwenya/Bakwena etc.) tribes from central Transvaal in South Africa; and the Hole – the Kalanga and Lozwi (Moyo, Tshuma, Nleya etc.) people Mzilikazi found in this area. The division was done mostly for security reasons and the Khumalo royal family had to maintain that to ensure they preserve royalty.
79	Nkulumane	One of the sons of King Mzilikazi and heir, founder of the Matebele kingdom
80	North End	Reference to the direction of the suburb
81	North Lynne	
82	North Trenance	Reference to position relative to that of Trenance
83	Northlea	
84	Northvale	Former town council area; reference to position and (Umguza) valley
85	Ntaba Moyo	
86	Orange Grove	
87	Paddonhurst	Named after Major Cecil Paddon, O.B.E. (pioneer)
88	Parklands	Estate name; Park Lands estate A (portion of original grant to Dominican Sisters)
89	Parkview	Situated on the location adjacent to the Centenary Park and proposed location of Bulawayo Zoo
90	Phelandaba	Phelandaba translates as "the matter is concluded", a reference to the successful conclusion to the struggle for security.
91	Phumula	Phumula means "a resting place", reference to the fact that many have built homes there to retire to.
92	Phumula South	Named in reference to relative position of Pumula
93	Queens Park	A reference to the Queen and the three main roads – Victoria, Alexandra and Elizabeth
94	Queens Park East	A reference to the position relative to that of Queen Park
95	Queens Park West	A reference to the position relative to that of Queen Park
96	Queensdale	
97	Rangemore	The suburb adopted the original estate name.
98	Raylton	The suburb adopted the original estate name.
99	Richmond	
100	Riverside	Derived from the original estate name, which was in reference to the Umguza River
101	Romney Park	The suburb was named after George Romney, a British painter.
102	Sauerstown	Named after Dr. Han Sauer the owner of the land.
103	Selbourne Park	Named after the main road of Selbourne Avenue, now called L. Takawira Avenue, facing Ascot Mansions
104	Sizinda	Battle regiment of Mzilikazi of the Matabele
105	Southdale	
106	Souththwold	The suburb was named by the estate developers, and street names are of many Cotswolds villages and towns.
107	Steeldale	Composite name referring to industry
108	Suburbs	This was the first suburb in Bulawayo and retained that name. The suburb has many tree-lined avenues and is where the Centenary Park, Natural History Museum and the Bulawayo Athletic Club are found.
109	Sunninghill	After British royal residence (given to present Queen at time of marriage)
110	Sunnyside	Chosen from list of suggested names
111	Tegela	The name is derived from a Ndebele word ukwethekela meaning "to visit".
112	The Jungle	
113	Thorngrove	The suburb's name came from the large number of mimosa (thorn) trees in the area.
114	Trenance	
115	Tshabalala	This is the "isibongo" or praise name for Lobengula's mother, Fulata, who was of Swazi extraction.
116	Tshabalala Extension	Extension in reference to the suburb of Tshabalala
117	Umguza Estate	Named after the Umguza River which runs through it
118	Upper Rangemore	Name in reference to Rangemore suburb
119	Waterford	
120	Waterlea	
121	West Somerton	
122	Westgate	
123	Westondale	
124	Willsgrove	
125	Windsor Park	Named after English town or Guildford Castle grounds
126	Woodlands	Chosen from a list of suggested names
127	Woodville	
128	Woodville Park	

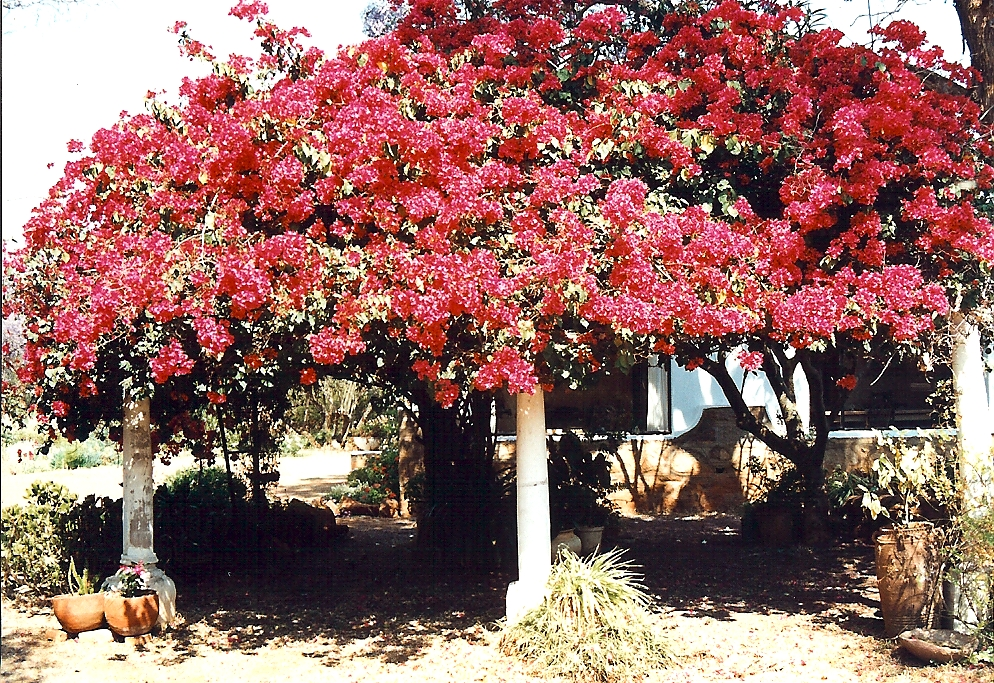
Bougainvillea outside a Bulawayo home

== Demographics ==
=== Population census controversy ===
Historical population
Year	Pop.	±%
1982	413,814	—
1992	620,936	+50.1%
2002	676,650	+9.0%
2012	653,337	−3.4%
2022	665,952	+1.9%
Source: Zimbabwe National Statistics Agency (ZIMSTAT)

The population of Bulawayo, according to the 2012 national census, stood at 653,337. However, this figure was rejected by the Bulawayo City Council, with Councillor Martin Moyo claiming an anti-Bulawayo conspiracy to under-fund projects in the city.

=== Ethnic groups ===
Ethnic Groups in Bulawayo City (2012 Census)
Ethnic Groups	percent
Black	97.96%
Coloured	1.0%
White	0.75%
Asian	0.12%
Other	0.02%
Not Stated	0.14%

The vast majority of Bulawayo City residents were Black African with 97.96%. Other ethnic groups in the city were Coloured (0.9%), White (0.75%) and Asian (0.22%). Members of other ethnic groups comprised 0.02%, and 0.14% of the city did not state their ethnic group. There were 4,926 White Zimbabweans living in Bulawayo in 2012.

== Economy ==
Bulawayo was known as the industrial hub of Zimbabwe, leading to the Zimbabwe International Trade Fair being hosted in Bulawayo. It had a large manufacturing presence with large industries based here before Zimbabwe's economic decline. However, some of these companies have either moved operations to Harare or have closed down – which has crippled Bulawayo's economy. Most factories are deserted and the infrastructure has since been left to deteriorate. The reason for the de-industrialization has largely been political, with some factories like Goldstar Sugars removing machinery to open new factories in Harare. When the Zimbabwean government passed indigenisation laws, some successful businesses were taken over by ZANU–PF supporters, only to close down a few years later.

Many locals argue that it is because of marginalisation they experience against the government due to political tensions with the ZANU-PF government in Harare and the MDC-run Bulawayo council. For instance, the National Railways of Zimbabwe (headquarters in Bulawayo) is a government-owned entity and, as such, should have been thriving had it not been for embezzlement of funds by company executives who are believed to be Shona. The water issue is not new and had brought about the "help a thirsty Matabele" initiative of the 1970s and the Matabeleland Zambezi Water Project which would put an end to the water issue in Matabeleland was drafted; however, this project was put on hold soon after independence.

These allegations have all been refuted by national authorities. The city still contains the bulk of Zimbabwe's heavy industry and food processing capability.

Like many parts of the country, Bulawayo seen a huge drop in service delivery and an increase in unemployment. Many people resort to farming, mining, and the black market for sustenance, while others depended on the little foreign currency that is sent by family in other countries. However, with the inauguration of the Mnangagwa government, a new approach is seen by investors in the city who admire the already-available infrastructure; the huge workforce; and see Bulawayo as a potential business hub. It is set to once again contribute greatly to the economy of Zimbabwe.

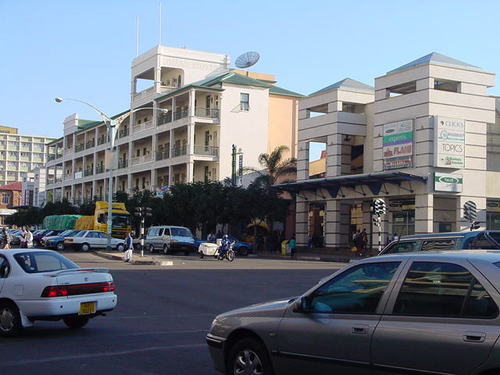
The Bulawayo Centre

=== Landmarks and institutions ===
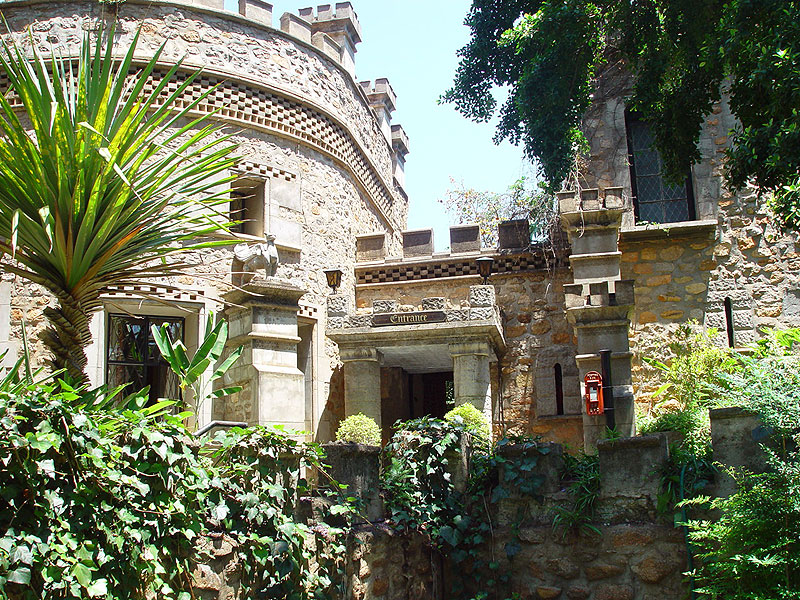
The Nesbitt Castle, Bulawayo

These include:

- Ascot Centre
- Barbourfields Stadium
- White City Stadium
- Egodini
- Bulawayo Centre
- Bulawayo Polytechnic College
- Bulawayo Golf Club
- Fidelity Life Centre
- Luveve Stadium
- Mhlahlandlela Government Complex
- Nesbitt Castle
- NRZ building
- National University of Science and Technology
- Zimbabwe International Trade Fair
- Bulawayo Airport (formal name: Joshua Mqabuko Nkomo International Airport)
- Zimbabwe School of Mines

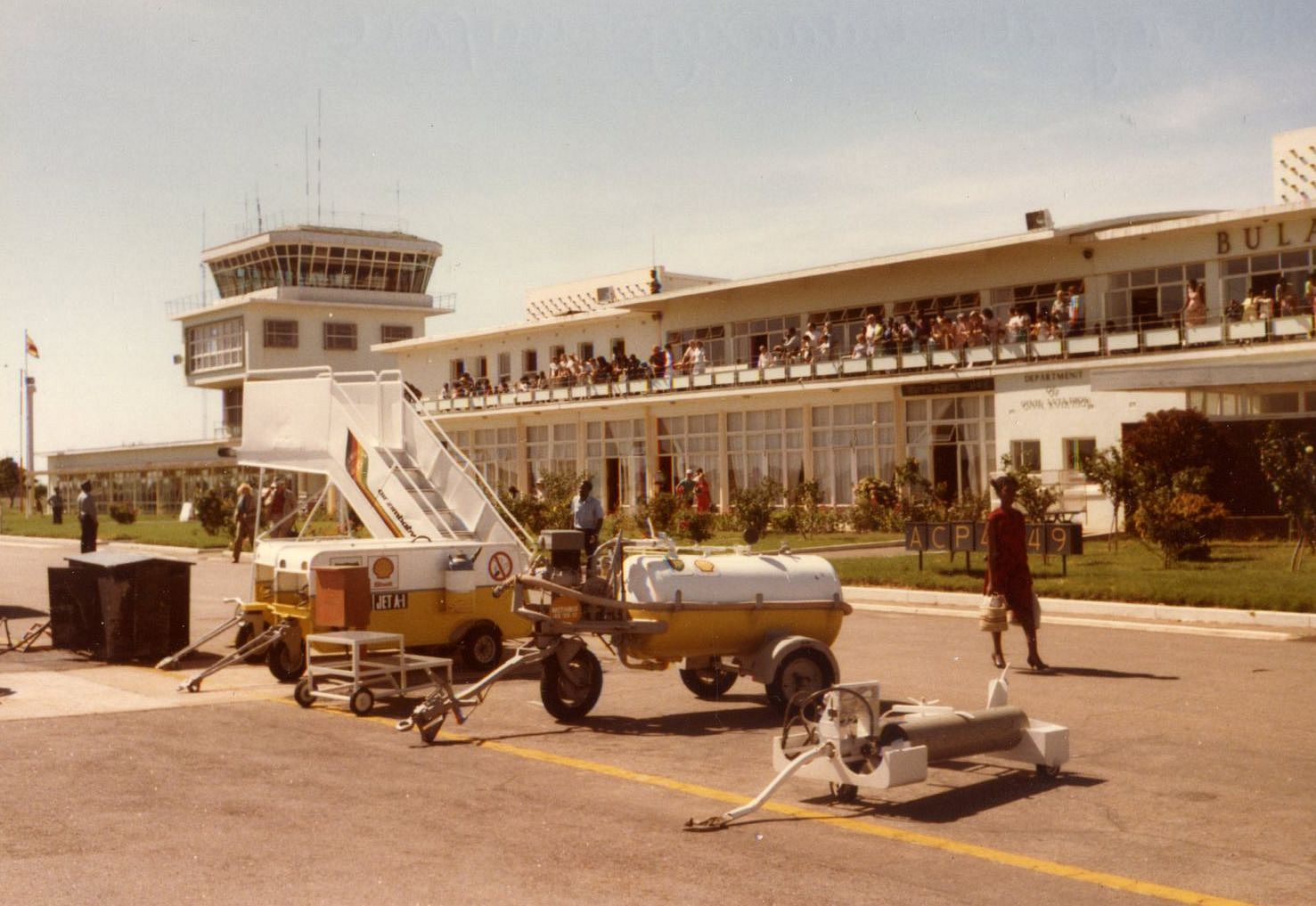
Bulawayo Airport building from the tarmac (1989)

== Government ==
Bulawayo is governed by the Bulawayo City Council, which is headed by the Mayor of Bulawayo.

== Culture ==
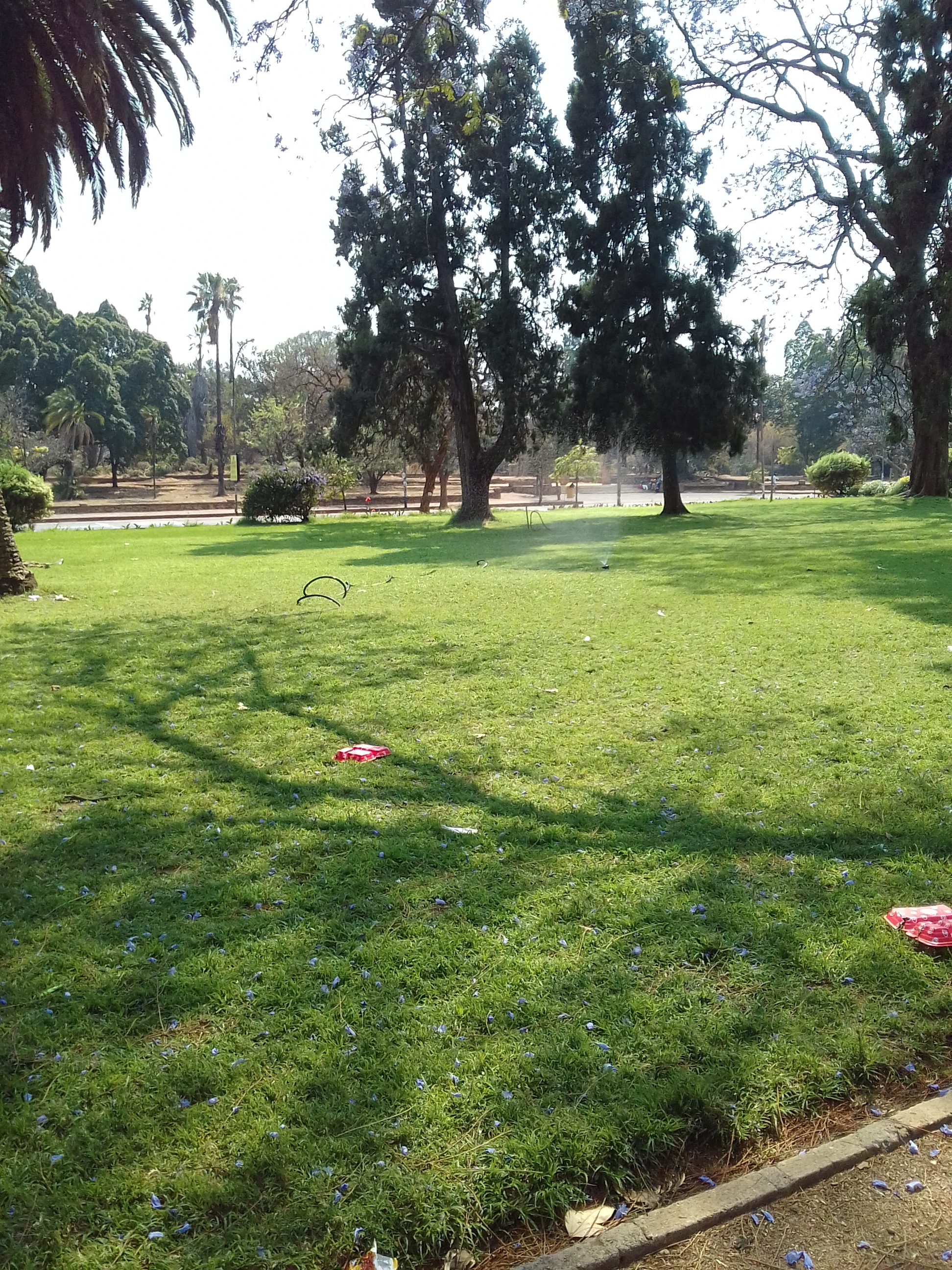
Centenary Park

Bulawayo has museums of national importance, including the Natural History Museum of Zimbabwe, National Gallery, Bulawayo and the Bulawayo Railway Museum.

Bulawayo also hosts an arts and culture festival annually in September, the Intwasa Arts Festival.

There are a number of parks in Bulawayo, including:

- Centenary Park (which includes an amphitheatre, lawns and a large fountain)
- City hall (with artists selling sculptures)
- Mthwakazi Arts Center
- Barham Green
- Hillside Dams Conservancy (which has a number of dams within it)
- Mabukweni
- Waterfront (which also has activities like zip line)
- Umguza Dam
- Matobo Sailing Club (which has activities including canoeing and Luna Park)

== Geography ==
Bulawayo is located in the south west of Zimbabwe, in the middle of savanna country. It has four seasons, with rains starting in late October to about March. The coldest months are May and June with July being cold and windy.

=== Topography ===
The city sits on a plain that marks the Highveld of Zimbabwe and is close to the watershed between the Zambezi and Limpopo drainage basins. The land slopes gently downwards to the north and northwest. The southern side is hillier, and the land becomes more broken in the direction of the Matobo Hills to the south.

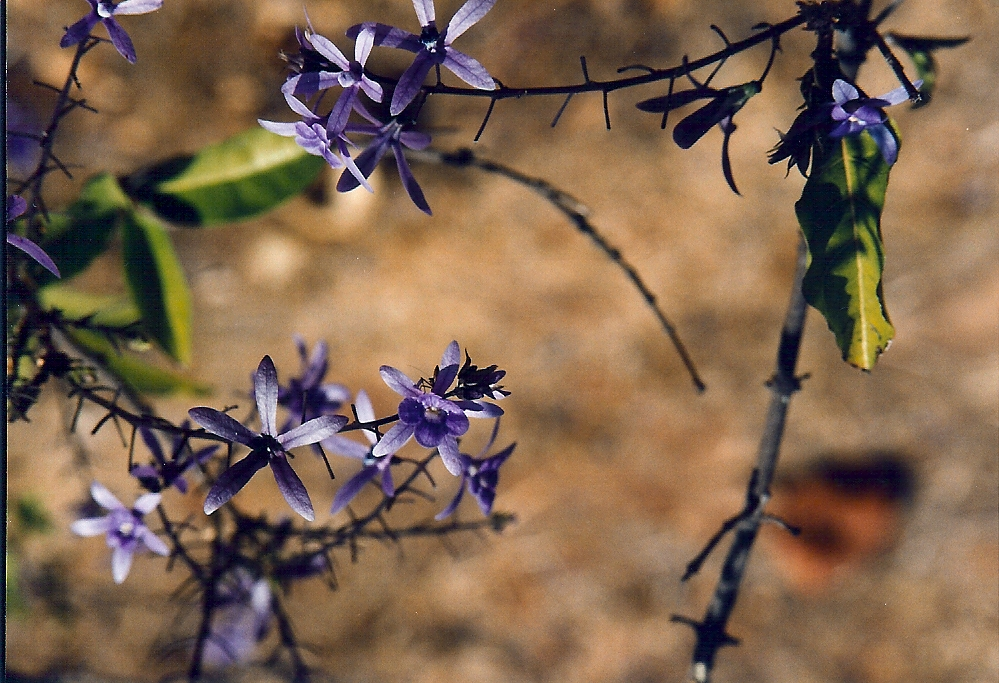
Petrea flower in a garden in Bulawayo

=== Climate ===
Under the Köppen climate classification, Bulawayo features a hot semi-arid climate (BSh). Due to its relatively high altitude, the city has fairly moderate temperatures despite lying in the tropics. The mean annual temperature is 19.16 °C (66.49 °F), similar to Pretoria, which is a similar elevation but almost 600 kilometres (370 mi) further south. As with much of southern and eastern Zimbabwe, Bulawayo is cooled by a prevailing southeasterly airflow most of the year and experiences three broad seasons: a dry, cool winter season from May to August; a hot dry period in early summer from late August to early November; and a warm wet period for the rest of the summer, early November to April.

The hottest month is October, which is usually the height of the dry season. The average maximum temperature ranges from 21 °C (70 °F) in July to 30 °C (86 °F) in October. During the rainy season, daytime maxima are around 26 °C (79 °F). Nights are always cool, ranging from 8 °C (46 °F) in July to 16 °C (61 °F) in January.

The city's average annual rainfall is 594 mm (23.4 in), which supports open woodland vegetation, dominated by Combretum and Terminalia trees. Most rain falls between December and February, while June to August is usually rainless. Being close to the Kalahari Desert, Bulawayo is vulnerable to droughts and rainfall tends to vary sharply from year to year. In 1978, 888 mm (35.0 in) of rain fell in the three months up to February. February 1944 was the wettest month on record with 368 mm (14.5 in), while in the three months ending in February 1983, only 84 mm (3.3 in) fell.

Climate data for Bulawayo
Month	Jan	Feb	Mar	Apr	May	Jun	Jul	Aug	Sep	Oct	Nov	Dec	Year
Record high °C (°F)	36.7 (98.1)	34.4 (93.9)	35.6 (96.1)	33.0 (91.4)	30.6 (87.1)	28.3 (82.9)	28.3 (82.9)	32.2 (90.0)	35.0 (95.0)	36.7 (98.1)	37.2 (99.0)	35.2 (95.4)	37.2 (99.0)
Mean daily maximum °C (°F)	27.7 (81.9)	27.2 (81.0)	27.1 (80.8)	25.9 (78.6)	24.1 (75.4)	21.6 (70.9)	21.5 (70.7)	24.4 (75.9)	27.9 (82.2)	29.4 (84.9)	28.7 (83.7)	27.7 (81.9)	26.1 (79.0)
Daily mean °C (°F)	21.8 (71.2)	21.2 (70.2)	20.6 (69.1)	18.7 (65.7)	16.0 (60.8)	13.7 (56.7)	13.8 (56.8)	16.4 (61.5)	19.9 (67.8)	21.6 (70.9)	21.7 (71.1)	21.4 (70.5)	18.9 (66.0)
Mean daily minimum °C (°F)	16.5 (61.7)	16.2 (61.2)	15.3 (59.5)	13.0 (55.4)	9.9 (49.8)	7.4 (45.3)	7.2 (45.0)	9.1 (48.4)	12.4 (54.3)	15.0 (59.0)	16.0 (60.8)	16.3 (61.3)	12.9 (55.2)
Record low °C (°F)	10.0 (50.0)	9.4 (48.9)	8.4 (47.1)	3.5 (38.3)	0.0 (32.0)	−3.9 (25.0)	0.0 (32.0)	0.0 (32.0)	1.4 (34.5)	6.9 (44.4)	7.2 (45.0)	8.9 (48.0)	−3.9 (25.0)
Average rainfall mm (inches)	117.8 (4.64)	104.6 (4.12)	51.4 (2.02)	33.3 (1.31)	7.0 (0.28)	2.2 (0.09)	1.0 (0.04)	1.4 (0.06)	7.0 (0.28)	38.4 (1.51)	91.1 (3.59)	120.3 (4.74)	575.5 (22.66)
Average rainy days	10	8	5	3	1	1	0	0	1	4	8	10	51
Average relative humidity (%)	69	71	70	62	56	54	48	43	41	43	55	63	56
Mean monthly sunshine hours	244.9	212.8	251.1	252.0	279.0	267.0	288.3	300.7	288.0	272.8	237.0	226.3	3,119.9
Mean daily sunshine hours	7.9	7.6	8.1	8.4	9.0	8.9	9.3	9.7	9.6	8.8	7.9	7.3	8.5
Source 1: World Meteorological Organization NOAA (sun and mean temperature, 1961–1990)
Source 2: Deutscher Wetterdienst (extremes and humidity)

=== Water supply ===
Bulawayo has good-quality tap water meeting international standards. Bulawayo does not recycle waste water but uses treated waste water for irrigation.

Bulawayo experiences water shortages in drought seasons due to the overwhelming increase in population versus the static and sometimes decreasing capacity of dams. The geographical factors causing water scarcity are rising temperatures, the area's high elevation and the arid environment of Matabeleland.

Environmental and sanitation circumstances have detrimental effects on water quality. Sources such as groundwater and tap water are subject to pollution due to waste from burst sewers contaminating them. Samples taken from well water from the Pumula and Robert Sinyoka suburbs show that well water has levels of Coliform bacteria exceeding levels recommended by the Standards Association of Zimbabwe and the World Health Organization.

== Sports ==
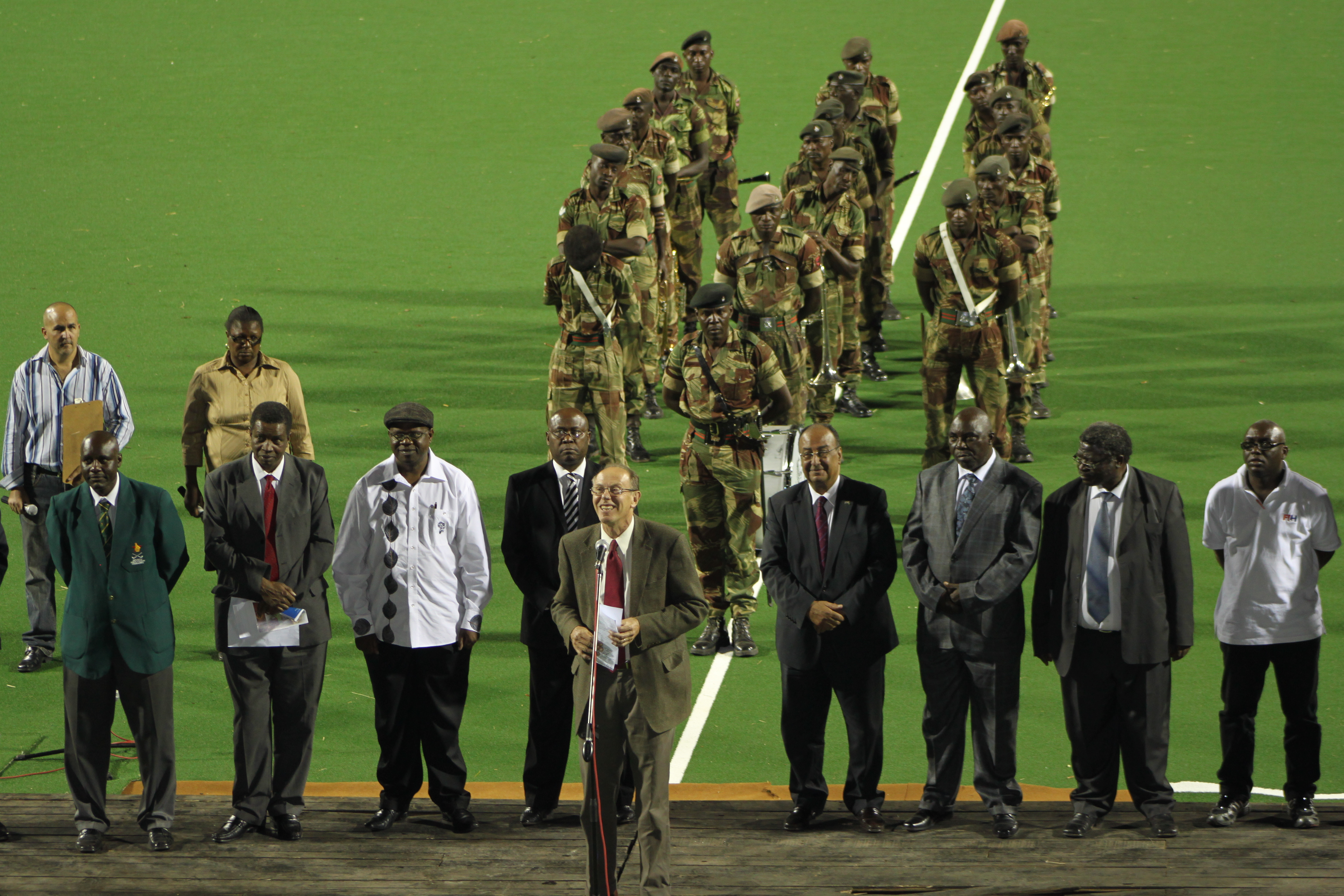
Opening ceremony of the African Olympic Hockey Qualifiers 2011, Khumalo Hockey Stadium

Bulawayo is home to the Queens Sports Club and Bulawayo Athletic Club, two of the three grounds in Zimbabwe where test match cricket has been played.

Bulawayo Golf Club, the first golf club in the city and country, was established in 1895. The Matsheumhlope Stream cuts through the 18 hole course in the suburbs.

It is home to Hartsfield Rugby grounds where many international Test matches have been played. Hartsfield was developed by Reg Hart, after whom the grounds were named and on which field many of southern Africa's greatest rugby players have competed. It is home to two large football teams: Highlanders and Zimbabwe Saints. Other football teams include Bantu Rovers, Chicken Inn, How Mine, Quelaton, and Bulawayo City (R).

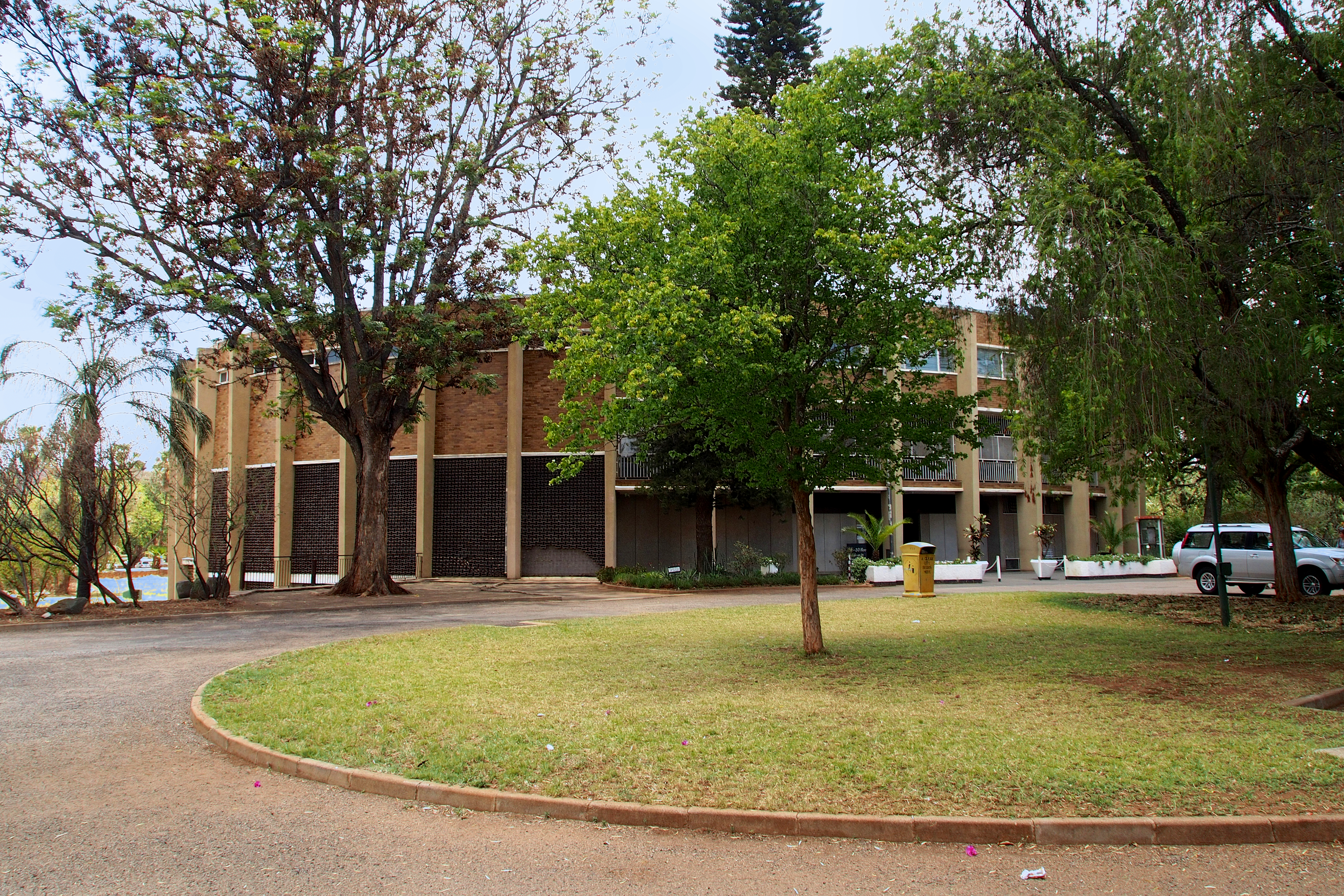
Natural History Museum of Zimbabwe

Other important sporting and recreational facilities include:

- Barbourfields Stadium
- Zimbabwe International Trade Fair Grounds
- Kumalo Hockey Stadium
- Ascot Racecourse
- Khami Ruins
- White City Stadium
- Karate centres

== Transport ==
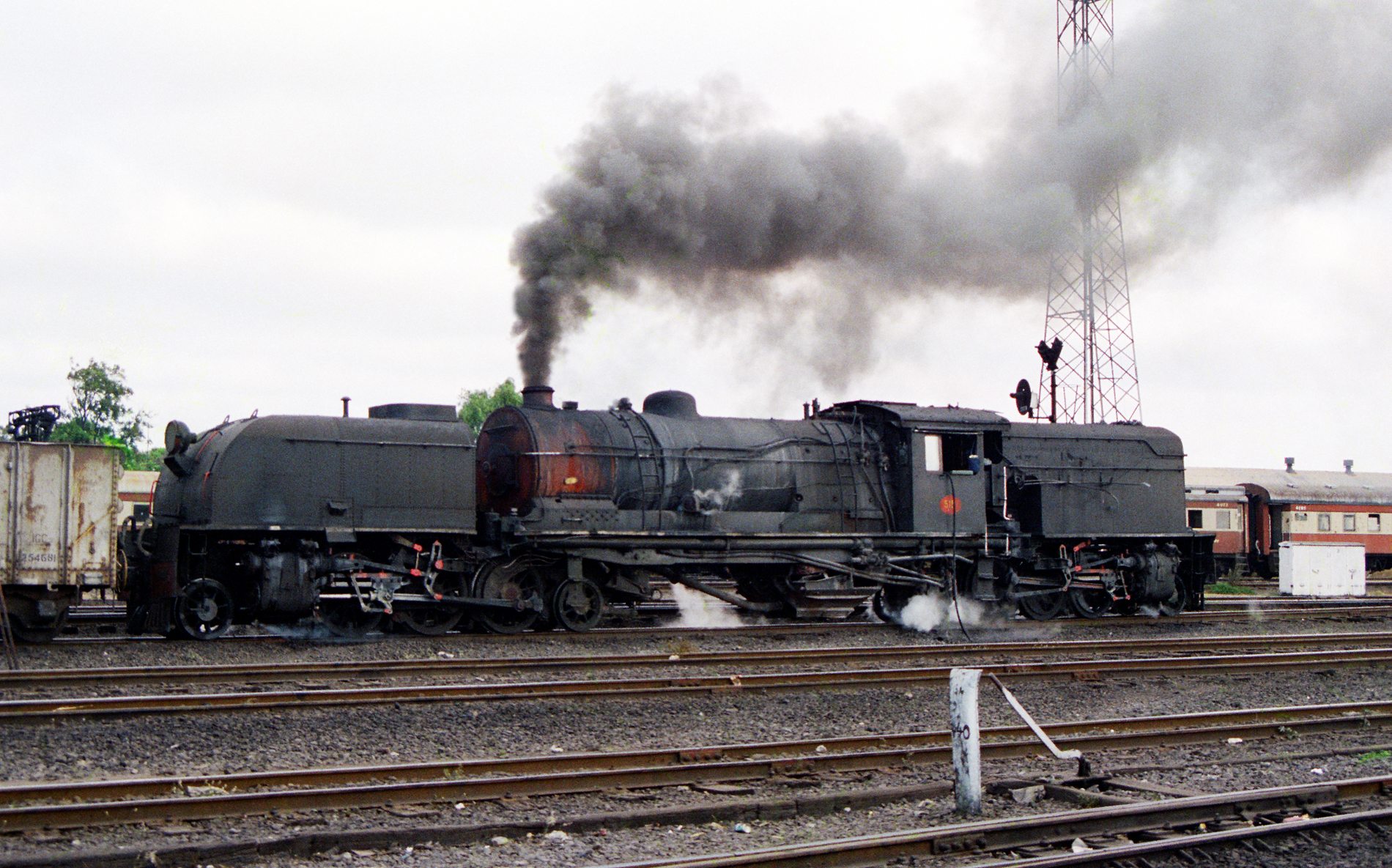
14A class Engine no 515 on Ash Spur shunt, Bulawayo Station

The city has a total road network of about 2,100 kilometres; in 2017, 70 percent was in poor condition. The R2 road links Bulawayo with Harare, and the Cape to Cairo Road links with Gaborone and Lusaka.

The Bulawayo railway station is the central point of the railway line that connects the cities of Lusaka and Gaborone (part of the Cape to Cairo Railway), as well as being the terminal of the Beira–Bulawayo railway, which connects with the cities of Gweru, Harare, Mutare and Beira. Through the station on the outskirts of Umzingwane, Bulawayo is connected to the Beitbridge Bulawayo Railway.

On 1 November 2013, a new terminal of Joshua Mqabuko Nkomo International Airport, formerly known as Bulawayo Airport, was opened.

== Healthcare ==
Bulawayo is home to many hospitals and other medical facilities. The United Bulawayo Hospitals, a public hospital network, operates Bulawayo Central Hospital, Richard Morris Hospital, Lady Rodwell Maternity Hospital, and Robbie Gibson Infectious Diseases Hospital. Mpilo Central Hospital, is the largest hospital in Bulawayo, and the second-largest in Zimbabwe, and features a nursing school and midwifery school on its campus. Bulawayo is also home to Ingutsheni Hospital, which at 700 beds is the largest psychiatric hospital in Zimbabwe. Other hospitals in Bulawayo include All Saints Children's Hospital, Hillside Hospital, Mater Dei Hospital, the Nervous Disorders Hospital, St Francis Hospital and Thorngrove Isolation Hospital.

== Education ==
In Bulawayo, there are 128 primary and 48 secondary schools.

=== Notable primary schools ===
- Dominican Convent Primary School, Bulawayo
- St. Thomas Aquinas Primary School
- Whitestone School

=== Higher education ===
Bulawayo is home to a number of colleges and universities. The National University of Science and Technology, Zimbabwe, (NUST), the second largest university in Zimbabwe, was established in Bulawayo in 1991. Solusi University, a Seventh-day Adventist institution established in Bulawayo in 1894, gained university status in 1994.

The Bulawayo Polytechnic College offers tertiary training for students who have completed GCE O Level and A Level education. It issues national certificates (NC), diplomas and higher national diplomas (HND) certificates. Bulawayo has two specialist teacher training colleges: Hillside Teachers College for secondary education and the United College of Education for primary education.

Bulawayo is home to a number of institutes of technology and vocational colleges, including Zimbabwe School of Mines, Westgate Industrial Training College, and the Zimbabwe Theological College. In addition, companies such as the National Railways of Zimbabwe (NRZ) and Zimbabwe Electricity and Supply Authority (ZESA) offer apprenticeship training for qualifying students who then become certified tradesworkers upon completion.

== Media ==
=== Newspapers ===
The Chronicle, a state-owned daily newspaper, and its Sunday edition, The Sunday News, are published in Bulawayo. The Chronicle is the second-oldest newspaper in Zimbabwe, and along with The Herald, published in Harare, it is one of two major state-owned newspapers in the country. UMthunywa, a state-owned Ndebele-language newspaper, is also published in Bulawayo, where the majority of the population belongs to the Ndebele people. Private online publications like Bulawayo24 News and B-Metro are also based in Bulawayo.

=== Radio ===
The two radio stations, Skyz Metro FM, which is the first dedicated commercial radio station for the city and Khulumani FM, owned by the Zimbabwe Broadcasting Corporation are based in the city and offer their programming mainly in English and Ndebele and other languages spoken in the Matabeleland region. The other six radio stations, only two of which are privately owned, are also accessible in the city via FM transmission.

=== Television ===
The state owned ZBC TV is the only free TV channel in the city. The majority of households rely on the South African-based satellite television distributor, DStv and OVHD for entertainment, news and sport across Africa and the world.

=== Internet ===
There are a number of internet service providers in the city. Most people in the city access the internet through their mobile phones mainly for news, entertainment and communication.

== International relations ==
Bulawayo has six sister cities:

- Aberdeen, Scotland (1986)
- Durban, South Africa
- Polokwane, South Africa (2012)
- Katima Mulilo, Namibia
- Francistown, Botswana
- Livingstone, Zambia

== See also ==
- List of cities and towns in Zimbabwe
