= RAF Induna =

Former Royal Air Force base in Zimbabwe

RAF Induna
- Bulawayo in Zimbabwe
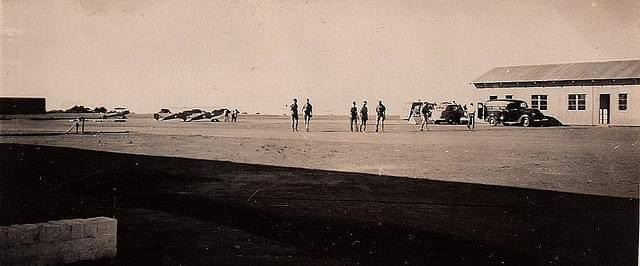
- Photograph showing activity of the No. 27 Elementary Flying Training School (EFTS) in RAF Induna.

Site information
- Owner: Air Ministry
- Operator: Royal Air Force
- Controlled by: Rhodesian Air Training Group

Location
- Shown within Zimbabwe
- Coordinates: 20°04′49″S 28°42′26″E

Site history
- Built: 1940
- In use: 1941 - 1945

Airfield information
- Identifiers: ICAO: FVIN

Royal Air Force Induna or more simply RAF Induna was a World War II Royal Air Force station located in N’Thabusinduna, Bulawayo, Southern Rhodesia (now Zimbabwe). It was established in 1940 as part of the Rhodesian Air Training Group under the Empire Air Training Scheme. It provided flight training to Commonwealth pilot cadets from 1941 until disbandment in 1945.

== History ==
RAF Induna was established on an ideally flat plateau in Ntabazinduna on 28 January, 1940, and its name was derived from the nearby flat-topped hill called Thabas-Induna, meaning Hill of the Headmen in the local language. On 28 January, 1941, the personnel and equipment of the No. 27 Elementary Flying Training School (EFTS) arrived. It was initially planned to be based at Sauerdale, however the unsuitability of the ground surface led to its relocation to RAF Induna. On 2 February, 1941, the No. 27 EFTS was officially formed at RAF Induna under the Rhodesian Air Training Group (RATG). The airfield operated a grass field, and take-offs and landings were conducted into the prevailing wind. Other facilities associated to the station was a camp, which included a sports field, swimming pool, gymnasium, and pre-fabricated huts on stilts built with iron sheets and Beaverboard linings. Access roads leading to RAF Induna were rolled dirt roads with narrow strips of tarmacadam.

RAF Induna operated alongside RAF Heany, providing more basic level training. The EFTS held survival courses, and prepared pilots for advanced training before operational service. However, attrition was high, and only around 6 out of 10 trainees progressed beyond EFTS. Cadets were commonly instructed on de Havilland DH.82A Tiger Moth, and Fairchild PT-26 from the airfield. Training syllabus involving aircraft included ground handling and tazing, take-offs and landing, straight and level flights, turns while maintaining altitude, stall recognition and recovery, spins and stall turns, and engine failure drills which involved restarting stopped propellers and forced landings in open terrain. Navigation also heavily relied on railways and farms in the area, with the aerodrome itself as a visual reference. During ground training, survival training courses were held cross country, and crews would commonly get lost. At the time, myth also spread of an aircrew that were killed by bushmen giraffe hunters in the desert basin west of RAF Induna. Due to the harshness of the courses, RATG crew would sometimes lose their lives, and were buried in the local Bulawayo cemetery. On 21 September, 1945, the No. 27 EFTS was disbanded, and RAF Induna was abandoned.

=== Post-war ===
Following World War II, RAF Induna remained abandoned until November 1946, when the Southern Rhodesian Government granted Rhodesia Fairbridge Memorial College in London to use the former station until a permanent building could be built. The existing buildings allowed accommodation for 250 pupils, capable of hosting grades 3 - 7. The school was closed in 1962–65.

== See also ==
- Belvedere Airport, the first airfield in Southern Rhodesia to host an EFTS unit under the Empire Air Training Scheme
- RAF Heany
- Southern Rhodesia in World War II
