= Barnabas Simpson =

The Reverend Barnabas Simpson
- Born: c. 1634
- Died: December 1712 (aged 77–78)
- Resting place: St Margaret and St James' Church, Long Marton
- Education: The Queen's College, Oxford
- Years active: 1660–1712

Barnabas Simpson (c. 1634 – 1712) was an English clergyman.

== Early life ==
Simpson was the son of Rev. Robert Simpson, a Westmerian Puritan minister. The choosing of his name was perhaps a token of appreciation to Barnaby Potter, who from 1629 to 1642 was Bishop of Carlisle, the family's most important patron. Simpson matriculated at The Queen's College, Oxford on 15 July 1652, graduating a B.A. on 11 July 1656 and M.A. on 21 April 1659. He was designated a fellow of The Queen's College on 1 March 1659.

== Career ==
Simpson was ordained as a deacon and priest by Robert Skinner, Bishop of Oxford. In 1661, he was instituted to two offices, both of Westmorland, by Richard Sterne, Bishop of Carlisle: the vicariate of Bongate on 1 November and the rectorate of Ormside on 5 November. The Bongate Registers record that Simpson "publiquely reade ye whole booke of Articles ye twenteth day of Aprill 1662" in its parish church "on ye Sabboth day and in ye time of divine Service and did thereunto willingly and ex animo give his full assent and Consent."

Perhaps the most prominent of Simpson's patrons was Lady Anne Clifford, who had the right of appointment to Long Marton and was said to have had Simpson's father Robert as her chaplain. In 1675, she paid tithe of £5 to him.

Simpson resigned as rector of Ormside in 1679 and on 8 January of that year was instituted to the rectorate of Long Marton. He held both the Bongate and Long Marton livings until his death.

In December 1700, Simpson signed a petition to Sir Christopher Musgrave, 4th Baronet requesting that he stand for the constituency of Westmorland in the interests of the established church. Musgrave stood, and won, in the January 1701 election alongside Henry Graham. Simpson was a correspondent of the bishop of Carlisle William Nicolson, to whom he was perhaps related by marriage, and was invited to dine with him on at least one occasion. During the election of 1702, he again sided with Musgrave and Graham, for whom Nicolson had canvassed strongly amongst the clergy.

As a result of Simpson's pluralism, Nicolson noted in his 1703 visitation that his Bongate livings had fallen into disrepair.

Mr. B Symson of Long Marton is Vicar here [Bongate]; And, haveing not resided in the parish for above twenty years past, has suffer'd the Vicarage-House to fall into decay. The walls are tolerably good: But little within that's sound. His curate is one Blamire a B. of Arts in Queen's College, Oxford; but has not lived so regularly, since his takeing Orders, as were to be wish'd. He's said to behave himself more soberly of late than heretofore.

Nicolson also noted that his Long Marton livings were in a similar condition.

The Parsonage-House looks extremely ill at ye first Entrance; but has a better Appearance behind. There's none of it in so good a Condition, as I could wish it; and I hope the worthy Rector. Mr. Barnaby Sympson, will shortly put it into better plight, tho' some late Afflictions have interpos'd.

The church livings of Ormside and Bongate were valued at £40 each in the early 18th century and Long Marton around four times as much, indicating that Simpson ranked amongst the most prosperous clergy of the time.

== Death ==
Simpson died in December 1712 and was buried on 12 December at St Margaret and St James' Church in Long Marton with his wife Elizabeth, who predeceased him by two years.

== Sources ==
- Nicolson, Joseph (1777). The History and Antiquities of the Counties of Westmorland and Cumberland Vol. I – via Internet Archive.
- Foster, Joseph (1891). Alumni oxonienses; the members of the University of Oxford, 1500-1714; their parentage, birthplace, and year of birth, with a record of their degrees. Oxford and London: Parker and co. – via Internet Archive.
- I. Nightingale, B. (1911). The Ejected of 1662 in Cumberland and Westmorland Vol. I. Manchester: Manchester University Press – via Internet Archive.
- II. Nightingale, B. (1911). The Ejected of 1662 in Cumberland and Westmorland Vol. II. Manchester: Manchester University Press – via Internet Archive.
- Magrath, John Richard (1921). The Queen's College. Oxford: The Clarendon Press – via Internet Archive.
- Smith, S. D. (2002). An Exact and Industrious Tradesman: The Letter Book of Joseph Symson of Kendal, 1711-1720. Oxford: Oxford University Press. ISBN 0197262589 – via Internet Archive.
