= Broom, Cumbria =

Hamlet in Cumbria, England

Coordinates: 54.608°N 2.517°W

Broom
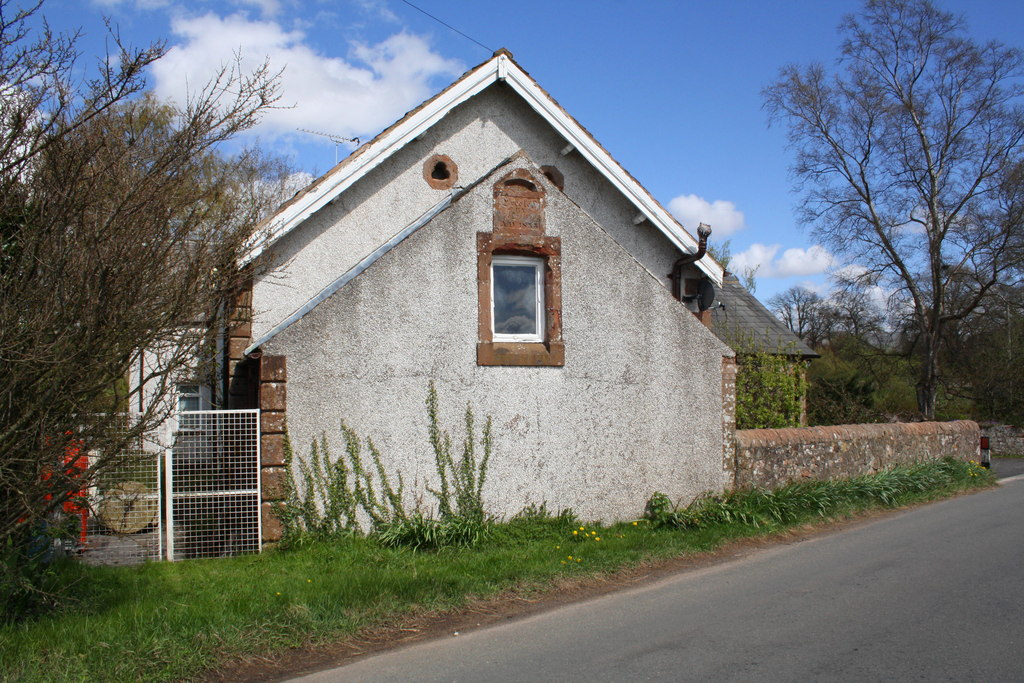
- The Old School, Broom

- Location in the former Eden District, Cumbria Location within Cumbria
- OS grid reference: NY666237
- Civil parish: Long Marton
- Unitary authority: Westmorland and Furness
- Ceremonial county: Cumbria
- Region: North West
- Country: England
- Sovereign state: United Kingdom
- Post town: APPLEBY-IN-WESTMORLAND
- Postcode district: CA16
- Dialling code: 017683
- Police: Cumbria
- Fire: Cumbria
- Ambulance: North West
- UK Parliament: Westmorland and Lonsdale

Broom is a hamlet near the village of Long Marton, in the Westmorland and Furness district, in the county of Cumbria, England.

== Location ==
It is located about two miles away from the small town of Appleby-in-Westmorland and about ten miles away from the large market town of Penrith.

== Nearby villages ==
Nearby villages include Brampton, Crackenthorpe, Long Marton and Dufton.

== Transport ==
For transport there is Appleby railway station (on the Settle-Carlisle Line), and the A66 road nearby.
