= Robert de Eglesfield =

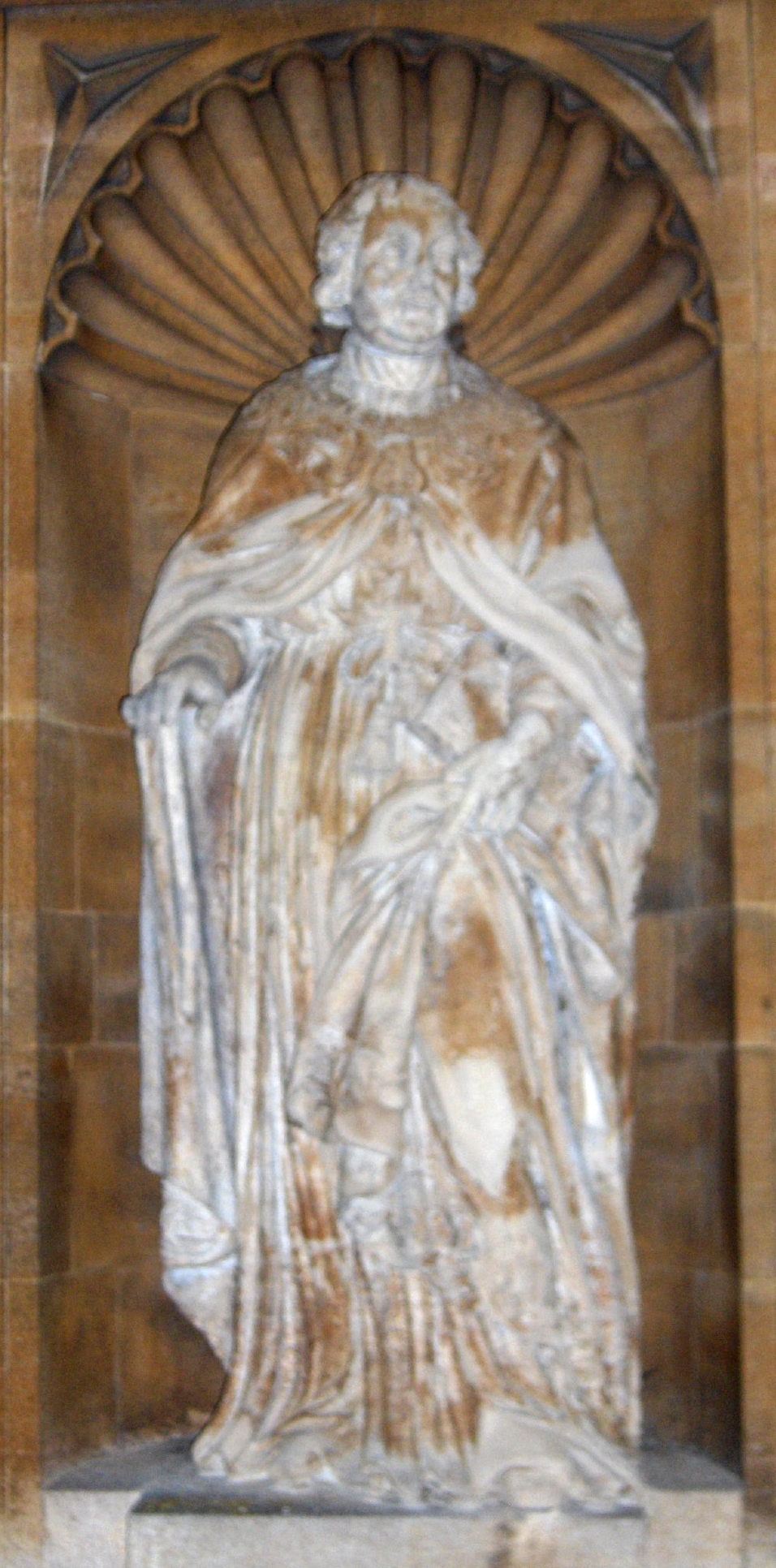
Statue of Robert de Eglesfield in The Queen's College.

Robert de Eglesfield (c. 1295–1349), 1341 founder of The Queen's College, Oxford, and a chaplain of Queen Philippa of Hainault in whose honour he named the college.

Robert was the third son of John of Eglesfield and Beatrix. John was himself third son of Thomas of Eglesfield and Hawisa. Their family held lands in and near Eaglesfield, near Cockermouth in Cumberland. Robert is recorded, aged about 21, as a valettus or yeoman in the service of Sir Anthony Lucy, lord of Cockermouth.

In the next few years, he acquired lands in Middlesex, which in February 1328 he exchanged for the manor of Renwick, Cumberland.

== King's clerk ==
He appears in April 1328 serving as member for Cumberland in the parliament which met at Northampton. By 1331 he is recorded as a king's clerk and thereafter remained in royal service but only on minor administrative duties. There is no record of a marriage or children.

== Ordination ==
There is no evidence that he took a degree or studied anywhere. To provide income he had been admitted to the rectory of Brough, Westmorland in July 1332 though he was not ordained a priest until February 1333 and did not permanently reside in his parish.

== Hall of the Queen's scholars of Oxford ==
Robert was one of Queen Philippa's chaplains in 1340 and next year founded what became known as The Queen's College, Oxford, purchasing the site from his own funds and adding to that gift his manor of Renwick. Having taken on the headship, he is named as Provost in deeds dated January and September 1347, he is known to have lived there during half of 1348 but he seems to have died elsewhere on 31 May 1349. His remains were interred in the chapel as he requested, but interment may not have taken place until some years after his death. The Queen and King assisted in the establishment of a modest endowment.

Not forgetting the 'devastated state, poverty and lack of letters' of the men of Cumberland and Westmorland from which he came, he asked for preference to be given to them, expecting few candidates, and to his own kin.
