= Listed buildings in Long Marton =

Long Marton is a civil parish in Westmorland and Furness, Cumbria, England. It contains 36 listed buildings that are recorded in the National Heritage List for England. Of these, one is listed at Grade I, the highest of the three grades, and the others are at Grade II, the lowest grade. The parish contains the villages of Long Marton, Brampton, and Knock, and the surrounding countryside. Most of the listed buildings are houses and associated structures, farmhouse and farm buildings. The other listed buildings include a church, a chapel, public houses, a railway goods shed and offices, and a telephone kiosk.

== Key ==
Grade	Criteria
I	Buildings of exceptional interest, sometimes considered to be internationally important
II	Buildings of national importance and special interest

== Buildings ==
Name and locationA	Photograph	Date	Notes	Grade
St Margaret and St James' Church; 54.60997°N 2.51776°W		Before 1066	The tower was added probably in the 12th century, the chancel was extended later that century, the south chapel was added in the 15th century, and the church was restored in the 19th century. The church has retained some Saxon and some Norman features. The earliest parts are in large stone blocks with projecting quoins, and the later parts are in smaller blocks on a chamfered plinth. The roofs are slated with stone coping. The church consists of a nave with a south porch and a south chapel, a chancel, and a west tower. The tower has three stages and a plain parapet.	I
Ivy House; 54.60451°N 2.49816°W	—	17th century or earlier	A farmhouse, later a private house, that was altered and extended in the early 18th century, and again in the 20th century. It is in sandstone with quoins and has a thatched roof. The house has a single storey with attics and three bays, and a later protruding two-storey two-bay extension on the right. On the front is a door, a sash window and a wedge dormer in the eaves. At the rear is a doorway with a dated lintel, sash windows and dormers.	II
Brampton Hall and barn 54.60250°N 2.49356°W	—	17th century	The farmhouse contains some earlier material, and is in stone with quoins and a stone-flagged roof. There are two storeys and six bays, with a gabled porch on the front. Only one mullioned window remains, now blocked, the other windows being 20th-century casements. There are continuous hood moulds on both the garden and the courtyard fronts. The barn, at right angles to the rear, dates from the later 18th to early 19th century, and is in stone with a slate roof.	II
Long Marton Hall; 54.61384°N 2.51698°W	—	Early 18th century	The house, once a rectory, is in sandstone with quoins, a band, and a hipped slate roof. The main block is symmetrical with two storeys, and to the left is a recessed range with 1 1/2 storeys. In the centre of the main block is a doorway that has a Tuscan doorcase with a pediment and a semicircular fanlight. This is flanked by tall sash windows, each with a stone surround and a broken pediment, and in the upper floor are four sash windows. The left range includes a French window with a broken pediment.	II
New Inn; 54.60422°N 2.49756°W	—	1730	A public house with Welsh slate roofs, quoins, and two storeys. It was extended to the right in the 19th century. The original part is stuccoed and has three bays, sash windows and a datestone. The extension is higher and has a lean-to porch and sash windows.	II
Town-end Farmhouse; 54.60622°N 2.50056°W	—	1736	The house was later extended. It is in stone with quoins, and has a slate roof with coping to the south. There are two storeys, the original part is symmetrical with three bays, and has a central doorway. The windows have two lights, they are mullioned and contain sashes. Above the doorway is a decorated dated panel with a moulded frame and a semicircular head. The extension to the right has two bays and sash windows.	II
Midtown Farmhouse; 54.61576°N 2.51869°W	—	1740	The house has two storeys and a slate roof. It was originally a small house with a barn, and was extended to the right in the 19th century. The original part is in stone on a boulder plinth, it has two bays, a panel with a dated inscription above the door, and a single-storey single-bay former barn to the left. The later part is in sandstone, and has quoins and three bays. The windows in both parts are sashes in stone surrounds, and in the former barn is a garage door.	II
Brampton Watermill; 54.60449°N 2.49007°W		18th century	The mill consists of a miller's house and a mill range, it is in rendered stone with slate roofs and has two storeys. The house has a gabled porch and sash windows, and at the rear is a single-storey kitchen wing. At the rear of the mill is a waterwheel under a gabled canopy. The mill machinery was restored in the 20th century.	II
Rose Cottage; 54.61464°N 2.51697°W		18th century	A stone house with quoins and a double-span slate roof. The front has two storeys and three bays, with a parapet between the gables. The central doorway has moulded impost blocks and a rectangular fanlight. There are sash windows in the left bay in both floors, and in the ground floor in the right bay. The window in the upper right bay, and the round-headed window above the door are trompe-l'œil.	II
The Cottage; 54.61457°N 2.51690°W	—	18th century	A stone house with a slate roof, two storeys and two bays. In the ground floor are two canted bay windows with hipped roofs, and in the upper floor are two sash windows in stone surrounds. The door is on the inner side of the left bay window.	II
House, cottage and barn opposite Ivy Cottage; 54.61566°N 2.51778°W	—	Mid to late 18th century	The house, cottage and barn are in stone with quoins, two storeys, and slate roofs. The house and cottage have stone coping, the house has three bays, and the cottage has two. In the centre of the house is a doorway with a gabled canopy, and the windows are sashes. The barn to the left dates from the 18th century, it is higher, and contains a wagon door and smaller doors, all with segmental heads and impost blocks.	II
Beech House; 54.61392°N 2.51696°W	—	Late 18th to early 19th century	Originally a rear wing of Long Marton Hall, it is in stone with quoins and a slate roof. There are two storeys, an L-shaped plan, and a front of five bays. The doors and sash windows have stone surrounds.	II
Wagon house and stables, Brampton Watermill; 54.60458°N 2.49058°W	—	Late 18th to early 19th century	The buildings are in stone with quoins, a stone-flagged roof, and two storeys. They contain a segmental-headed wagon door, two stable doors, and a loft door.	II
Clickham Farmhouse; 54.59573°N 2.49590°W	—	Late 18th to early 19th century	A stone house on a chamfered plinth, with rusticated quoins, slate roofs, and two storeys. It has a symmetrical front with a central block of three bays, and has stone copings and a central doorway with an architrave. There are flanking single-bay wings with eaves bands and hipped roofs. The windows are sashes.	II
Ivy Cottage; 54.61538°N 2.51817°W	—	Late 18th to early 19th century	Originally two houses, later combined into one, it is in stone with quoins, and has a slate roof with stone coping. There are two storeys and five bays. On the front are two doorways, one with a porch, sash windows in stone surrounds, and a possible datestone.	II
Penerin; 54.61532°N 2.51811°W	—	Late 18th to early 19th century	A sandstone house with quoins and a slate roof with stone coping to the south. It has two storeys and a symmetrical front of three bays, a central gabled porch, and sash windows.	II
Red House; 54.61513°N 2.51784°W	—	Late 18th to early 19th century	A stone house with rusticated quoins and a slate roof. It has two storeys, a symmetrical three-bay front, and a lean-to extension on the right. Above the door is a broken pediment, and the window are sashes.	II
Saunders; 54.61650°N 2.51939°W		Late 18th to early 19th century	A stone house on a chamfered plinth, with quoins, a band, and a hipped slate roof. There are two storeys and three bays. The central doorway has a rusticated surround and a semicircular fanlight. There is a double sash window to the right of the door, a single sash window to the left of the door, and three single sashes in the upper floor. All the windows have semicircular heads and stone surrounds with impost blocks and projecting keystones.	II
Walls, piers and railings, Saunders; 54.61656°N 2.51916°W	—	Late 18th to early 19th century	In front of the garden are low walls with chamfered coping. The gate piers are monoliths with convex moulding and square caps with pointed finials. The end piers are similar but with domical pyramidal caps. The railings and gates are in wrought iron with pointed standards.	II
Farmhouse and barn, southeast of White House; 54.63692°N 2.49460°W	—	Late 18th to early 19th century	The house and barn are in stone and have slate roofs with stone copings. The house has quoins, two storeys, and a symmetrical front of three bays. In the centre is a doorway with a rusticated surround flanked by two-light windows, and in the upper floor are casement windows. The barn to the right is higher and later, and contains doorways with elliptical heads, windows, and a loft door.	II
Methodist Chapel; 54.61475°N 2.51744°W		1818	The chapel occupies the upper floor of a house. The building is in sandstone on a chamfered plinth, with quoins, moulded eaves, and a hipped slate roof. The entrance is approached by a flight of steps. The doorway has a shouldered rusticated surround, above it is a carved decorative panel, and it is flanked by round-headed windows. In the ground floor are sash windows.	II
Town Head Farmhouse; 54.61731°N 2.51943°W	—	1820	The farmhouse, incorporating an earlier house, is in stone on a chamfered plinth, with rusticated quoins, bands, and a slate roof. There are two storeys and a symmetrical three-bay front. The central doorway has an architrave, a fanlight, and a segmental pediment with a tympanum containing the date and a carved vase with lilies. Set back to the left is the original house, which is pebbledashed and has a slate roof and mullioned windows.	II
Walls, railings, gate and piers, Town Head Farm; 54.61707°N 2.51931°W	—	c. 1820	The garden of the farmhouse is enclosed by a low sandstone wall with semicircular coping, and has cast iron railings with pointed standards. The gate and end piers are monoliths with convex moulding and square caps with pointed finials.	II
Town Foot and shop 54.61456°N 2.51730°W	—	Early 19th century	A pair of stuccoed buildings with a slate roof and two storeys. Town Foot to the left has two bays, and the building to the right has three. Both buildings have doorways with a cornice, and the windows are sashes. (Note: Street View in March 2010 shows that the former shop to the right of Town End has been converted into a house called Lyndhurst.)	II
Walls, piers and railings, House opposite Ivy Cottage; 54.61558°N 2.51791°W	—	Early 19th century (probable)	The walls in front of the gardens of the house and cottage are in stone with chamfered coping. The gate and end piers are rusticated, and have square moulded capitals with pyramidal caps. The railings are in cast iron, and have pointed standards.	II
Brampton Tower; 54.59455°N 2.49625°W	—	Mid 19th century	A stone house in Gothic Revival style with quoins, slate roofs, projecting embattled parapets on the front, and a crow-stepped north gable at the rear. The house has embattled corner turrets; a single-storey two-bay wing to the left that has a door with a chamfered surround and a pointed head, and a three-light window with a hood mould; a three-storey tower with a three-light window on each floor; a two-storey, two-bay block; and to the right is a single-storey single-bay block. All the windows have semicircular heads.	II
Stables, Brampton Watermill; 54.60455°N 2.49039°W	—	Mid to late 19th century	The stables are in stone with quoins, a slate roof, and two storeys. The stables contain two doors with segmental heads, casement windows, and external steps leading to a loft door.	II
Barn and byres, Town Head Farm; 54.61753°N 2.51977°W	—	Mid to late 19th century	The outbuildings are in stone with quoins and hipped slate roofs. The central barn has two storeys and seven bays, and it contains a coach door, smaller doors, a threshing door, and windows. At the north end at right angles is a two-storey six-bay byre range, with doors and windows, and with ventilation slits in the form of lancets. At the south end at right angles is a two-storey two-bay byre range. All the openings have chamfered surrounds and elliptical heads.	II
Hen-house and pig-sties, Town Head Farm; 54.61732°N 2.51981°W	—	Mid to late 19th century	The building is in stone with quoins and has a lean-to slate roof with stone coping at the east end. There is one storey and four bays. On the front are three openings with elliptical heads and a window to the left. In the west gable are two holes for access by birds, and in the rear wall are the remains of four bee boles with triangular heads.	II
White House and barn 54.63698°N 2.49496°W	—	Mid to late 19th century	The house is in stone and has a slate roof with stone-flagged eaves and stone copings. There are two storeys, the original part has three bays, and a two-bay cottage has been incorporated at the left. The doorway has pilasters and a broken pediment, and the windows are sashes. Further to the left is a barn with a Welsh slate roof and a hayloft.	II
Goods shed, office and weighbridge office 54.61563°N 2.51616°W	—	1873	The buildings were constructed by the Midland Railway for the Settle-Carlisle Line. They are in sandstone with quoins and have Welsh slate roofs with tiled ridges. The goods shed has a single storey and carries a single railway line. On the northeast front are three segmental-arched loading entrances and four lancet windows. To the right is a smaller office. There is also a detached small single-storey weighbridge office to the north.	II
Telephone kiosk 54.61565°N 2.51804°W	—	1935	A K6 type telephone kiosk, designed by Giles Gilbert Scott. Constructed in cast iron with a square plan and a dome, it has three unperforated crowns in the top panels.	II
Wall with bee boles, Brampton Watermill; 54.60447°N 2.49023°W	—	Undated	The retaining wall is to the west of the watermill. It is in stone with flat copings, and contains five rectangular bee boles.	II
Walls, piers, gates and railings, Methodist Chapel; 54.61480°N 2.51730°W	—	Undated	The forecourt of the chapel is enclosed by sandstone walls. The front wall is low with chamfered coping, and the side walls are higher with segmental coping. On the front wall are cast iron railings with pointed standards. In the corners are square end piers with domical tops. The central gate has an overthrow carrying a lamp.	II
Walls, railings and gates, Rose Cottage and The Cottage; 54.61456°N 2.51705°W	—	Undated	Enclosing the forecourt of the houses is a low stone wall with segmental coping, carrying wrought iron railings that have standards with corkscrew twisted tops. On the gates is decorative scrollwork.	II
Walls and railings, White House; 54.63699°N 2.49521°W	—	Undated	The low stone walls in front of the garden have wide segmental coping, the gate piers have square domical tops, and the wrought iron railings have standards with a corkscrew twist.	II

== Notes and references ==
=== Sources ===
- Historic England, "Church of St Margaret and St James, Long Marton (1075165)", National Heritage List for England
- Historic England, "Ivy House, Long Marton (1262005)", National Heritage List for England
- Historic England, "Brampton Hall and adjoining barn, Long Marton (1327002)", National Heritage List for England
- Historic England, "Long Marton Hall, Long Marton (1356595)", National Heritage List for England
- Historic England, "New Inn, Long Marton (1144946)", National Heritage List for England
- Historic England, "Town-end Farmhouse, Long Marton (1144945)", National Heritage List for England
- Historic England, "Midtown Farmhouse, Long Marton (1049073)", National Heritage List for England
- Historic England, "Brampton Watermill, Long Marton (1144947)", National Heritage List for England
- Historic England, "Rose Cottage, Long Marton (1144951)", National Heritage List for England
- Historic England, "The Cottage, Long Marton (1356609)", National Heritage List for England
- Historic England, "House, Cottage, and Barn opposite Ivy Cottage, Long Marton (1049112)", National Heritage List for England
- Historic England, "Beech House, Long Marton (1144950)", National Heritage List for England
- Historic England, "Wagon house and stables to north-west of Brampton Watermill, Long Marton (1326963)", National Heritage List for England
- Historic England, "Clickham Farmhouse, Long Marton (1144943)", National Heritage List for England
- Historic England, "Ivy Cottage, adjoining Penerin, Long Marton (1144953)", National Heritage List for England
- Historic England, "Penerin, adjoining Ivy Cottage, Long Marton (1372605)", National Heritage List for England
- Historic England, "Red House, Long Marton (1326966)", National Heritage List for England
- Historic England, "Saunders, Long Marton (1326967)", National Heritage List for England
- Historic England, "Forecourt walls, piers and railings to front of Saunders, Long Marton (1144955)", National Heritage List for England
- Historic England, "Farmhouse and adjoining barn to south-east of White House, Long Marton (1144949)", National Heritage List for England
- Historic England, "Methodist Chapel, Long Marton (1144952)", National Heritage List for England
- Historic England, "Town Head Farmhouse, Long Marton (1373868)", National Heritage List for England
- Historic England, "Front and east return walls, railings, gate and piers to Town Head Farmhouse, Long Marton (1326968)", National Heritage List for England
- Historic England, "Town Foot and adjoining shop, opposite Rose Cottage, Long Marton (1326965)", National Heritage List for England
- Historic England, "Forecourt walls, gates, end piers, and railings to house and cottage opposite Ivy Cottage, Long Marton (1144954)", National Heritage List for England
- Historic England, "Brampton Tower, Long Marton (1144942)", National Heritage List for England
- Historic England, "Stables to west of Brampton Watermill, Long Marton (1068846)", National Heritage List for England
- Historic England, "Barn and byres to north of Town Head Farmhouse, Long Marton (1144956)", National Heritage List for England
- Historic England, "Hen-house and pig-sties to west of Town Head Farmhouse, Long Marton (1049047)", National Heritage List for England
- Historic England, "White House and adjoining barn, Long Marton (1067770)", National Heritage List for England
- Historic England, "Long Marton goods shed with office and detached weighbridge office, Long Marton (1411445)", National Heritage List for England
- Historic England, "K6 Telephone kiosk, Long Marton (1326992)", National Heritage List for England
- Historic England, "Retaining wall with bee-boles to west of Brampton Watermill, Long Marton (1144948)", National Heritage List for England
- Historic England, "Forecourt walls, piers, central gate and railings to Methodist Chapel, Long Marton (1342736)", National Heritage List for England
- Historic England, "Forecourt walls, railings, and gates to Rose Cottage and The Cottage, Long Marton (1342741)", National Heritage List for England
- Historic England, "Forecourt walls and railings to front of White House, Long Marton (1326964)", National Heritage List for England
- Historic England, Listed Buildings
- Hyde, Matthew; Pevsner, Nikolaus (2010) [1967], Cumbria, The Buildings of England, New Haven and London: Yale University Press, ISBN 978-0-300-12663-1
