= Knock, Cumbria =

Village in Cumbria, England

Coordinates: 54.637°N 2.496°W

Knock
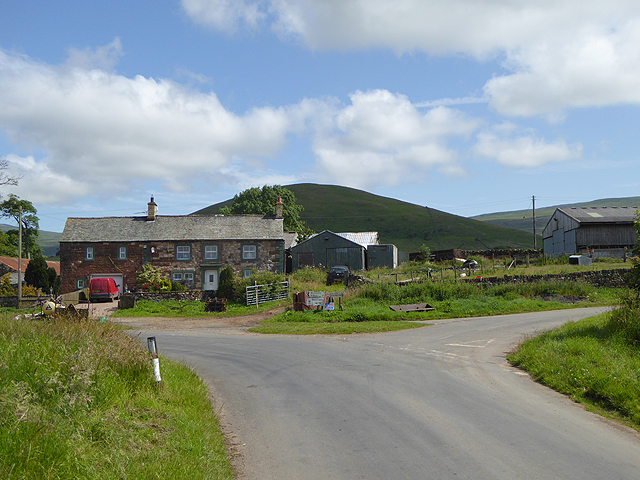
- Road junction at the western end of Knock village, with Knock Pike visible behind.

- Location in Eden, Cumbria Location within Cumbria
- OS grid reference: NY679270
- Civil parish: Long Marton
- Unitary authority: Westmorland and Furness
- Ceremonial county: Cumbria
- Region: North West
- Country: England
- Sovereign state: United Kingdom
- Post town: APPLEBY-IN-WESTMORLAND
- Postcode district: CA16
- Dialling code: 017683
- Police: Cumbria
- Fire: Cumbria
- Ambulance: North West
- UK Parliament: Westmorland and Lonsdale

Knock is a small village in the Westmorland and Furness district of Cumbria, England, and 1.9 km northwest of the larger village of Dufton and 3.1 km south of the village of Milburn. It lies midway between Cross Fell to the north and the town of Appleby-in-Westmorland to the south. Knock is situated 1 km east of the small hamlet and farm, Knock Cross.

== History, geography and toponymy ==
The place-name 'Knock' is first attested in a Yorkshire charter from between 1150 and 1162, where it appears as Chonoc-salchild. It appears as Knok in an Inquisition post mortem of 1323. The name means 'hillock', from the Brittonic *cnuc, Old Irish cnocc or Irish cnoc; an apparent reference to the nearby Knock Pike, which is 1,306 feet high, and can be seen in the photo to the right. Circa 1870, it had a population of 197 as recorded in the Imperial Gazetteer of England and Wales. Knock is also shown on Thomas Jefferys's 1770 map of Westmorland.

Knock once had a Methodist chapel, but that was closed and the chapel at Dufton was renamed "Dufton with Knock Methodist Church". The former chapel in Knock was gutted in a fatal fire in April 2018 that killed two people.

== See also ==
- Listed buildings in Long Marton
