= St Margaret and St James' Church, Long Marton =

Coordinates: 54.6100°N 2.5178°W

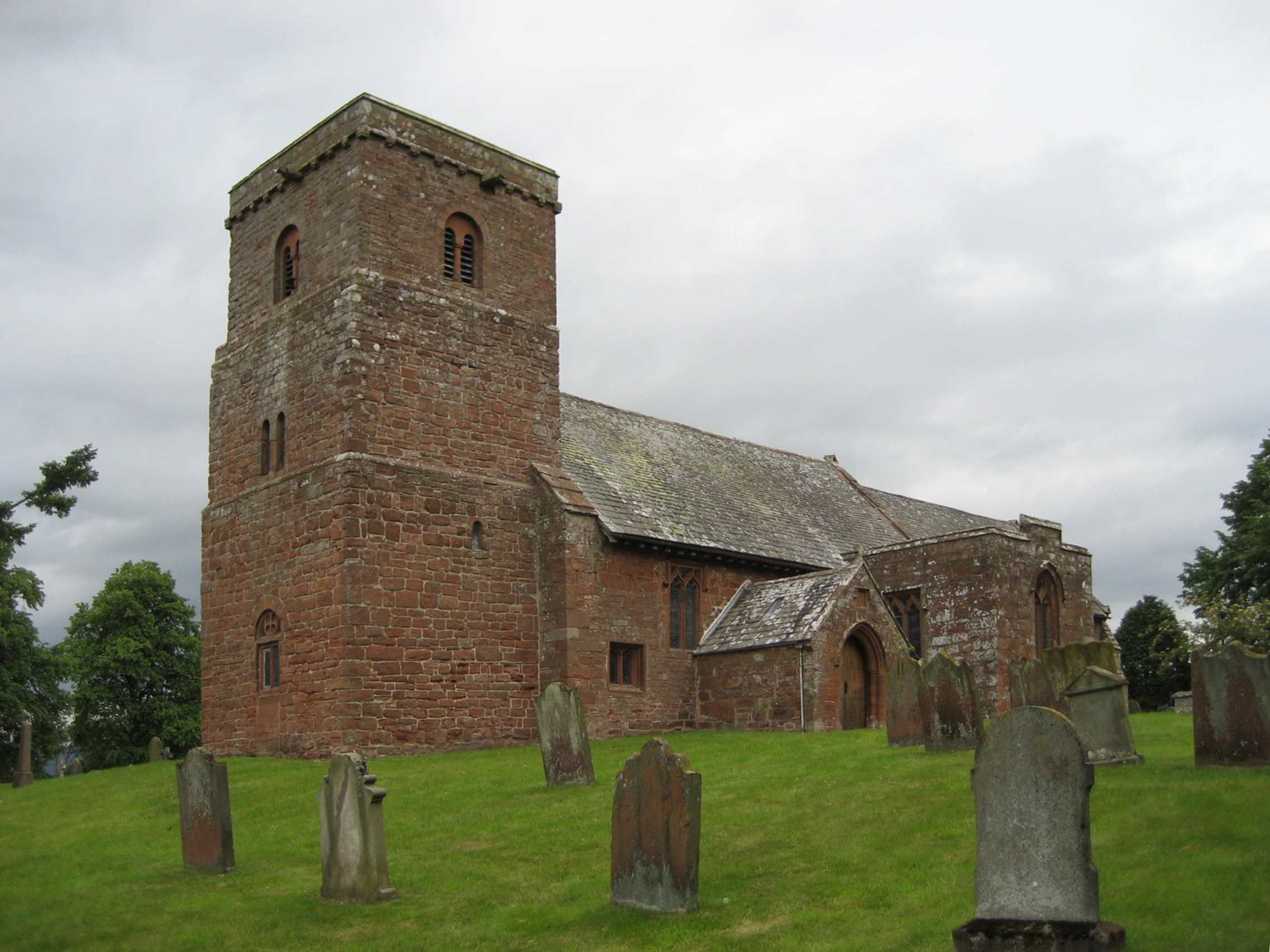
- St Margaret and St James' Church, Long Marton, from the southeast

- Location in Cumbria
- OS grid reference: NY 667 240
- Location: Long Marton, Cumbria
- Country: England
- Denomination: Anglican
- Website: St Margaret and St James, Long Marton

History
- Status: Parish church

Architecture
- Functional status: Active
- Heritage designation: Grade I
- Designated: February 1968
- Architect: John A. Cory (restoration)
- Architectural type: Church
- Style: Anglo-Saxon, Norman, Gothic

Specifications
- Materials: Stone, slate roofs

Administration
- Province: York
- Diocese: Carlisle
- Archdeaconry: Carlisle
- Deanery: Appleby
- Parish: Long Marton

Clergy
- Rector: Revd Andrew Burrell

St Margaret and St James' Church is located about 0.5 miles (0.8 km) to the south of the village of Long Marton, Cumbria, England. It is an active Anglican parish church in the deanery of Appleby, the archdeaconry of Carlisle, and the diocese of Carlisle. The parish is one of ten local parishes (Note: The "Heart of Eden Parishes": Long Marton, Dufton, Milburn, Appleby-in-Westmorland, Murton, Great Ormside, Great Asby, Temple Sowerby, Kirkby Thore, Newbiggin, Warcop, and Great Musgrave) which form the benefice of the Heart of Eden. The church is recorded in the National Heritage List for England as a designated Grade I listed building.

== History ==
Originating before the Norman Conquest of 1066, the church contains Anglo-Saxon and Norman architectural features. The tower was added probably in the early 12th century, and the chancel was extended later that century. A south chapel was added in the 15th century, (Note: This was built for the use of the residents of Knock village, and is known as the Knock Porch.) and the vestry in the following century. The church was restored by John A. Cory in 1880.

== Architecture ==
The church is constructed in stone with large quoins and slate roofs. Its plan consists of a nave with a south porch, a south chapel (or transept), a chancel with a north vestry, and a west tower. Parts of the nave walls are Anglo-Saxon, other parts of the nave and the blocked north doorway are Norman, and the chancel is in Decorated style. The tower is in three stages, with paired bell openings. The windows around the church are in varying styles, most of them being mullioned. Three of the doorways have tympana containing carvings of dragons and other items. Inside the chancel are a double sedilia and a piscina. Most of the furnishings are from Cory's restoration. A window has been inserted into the blocked north doorway; this contains stained glass dated 1930 by Stanley M. Scott, depicting Saints Margaret and James flanked by Saints Cosmas and Damian. In the south transept is a window of 1925 to the memory of the architect George Dominic Stampa.

== See also ==
- Grade I listed churches in Cumbria
- Grade I listed buildings in Cumbria
- Listed buildings in Long Marton
