= Sockbridge and Tirril =

Civil parish in Cumbria, England

Coordinates: 54.627°N 2.768°W

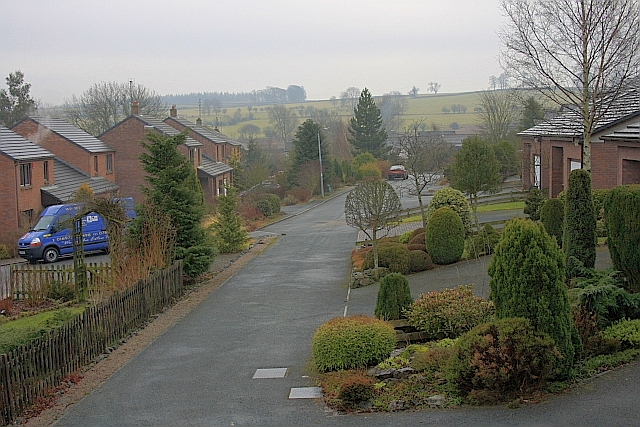
- Thorpe Field

- Location within Cumbria
- Population: 415 (2011)
- OS grid reference: NY5026
- Civil parish: Sockbridge and Tirril
- Unitary authority: Westmorland and Furness
- Ceremonial county: Cumbria
- Region: North West
- Country: England
- Sovereign state: United Kingdom
- Post town: PENRITH
- Postcode district: CA10
- Dialling code: 01768
- Police: Cumbria
- Fire: Cumbria
- Ambulance: North West
- UK Parliament: Westmorland and Lonsdale

Sockbridge and Tirril is a small civil parish in Westmorland and Furness, Cumbria. It had a population of 397 in 2001, increasing to 415 at the 2011 Census. It comprises the adjoining settlements of Tirril, Sockbridge and Thorpe. All three were once separate places but are now, in effect, a single village. They are near Penrith. The two villages are separated by a river.

The parish was formed in 1866 as Sockbridge and was previously a township in the parish of Barton.

== History and description ==
Tirril had a Quaker Meeting House from 1668 to 1862. The meeting house was built by Thomas Wilkinson (1686–1758). From 1902 the building was used as the Village Reading Room and in 1932 sold for £140. It is now a house.

The boundary with the parishes of Askham and Barton also forms part of the boundary of the Lake District National Park.

The parish is mainly residential, at one time it also included a trekking centre. Sockbridge Trekking Centre provided hacks of 30mins, 1hr, 2hr and full day treks and also did lessons: Mondays for experienced and Fridays for beginners. They did hacks for first timers to the experienced. However the centre closed in 2013 following the death of the proprietor.

In April 2017 Eden District Council approved an application to build 30 houses in Sockbridge and Tirril; a decision, which given the limited infrastructure of the villages, was strongly opposed locally.

The public house in Tirril is the Queen's Head. This was the original home of the Tirril Brewery which is now, despite its name, based beneath the Pennine fells in a Grade II listed red sandstone barn in the village of Long Marton near the ancient county town of Appleby-in-Westmorland.

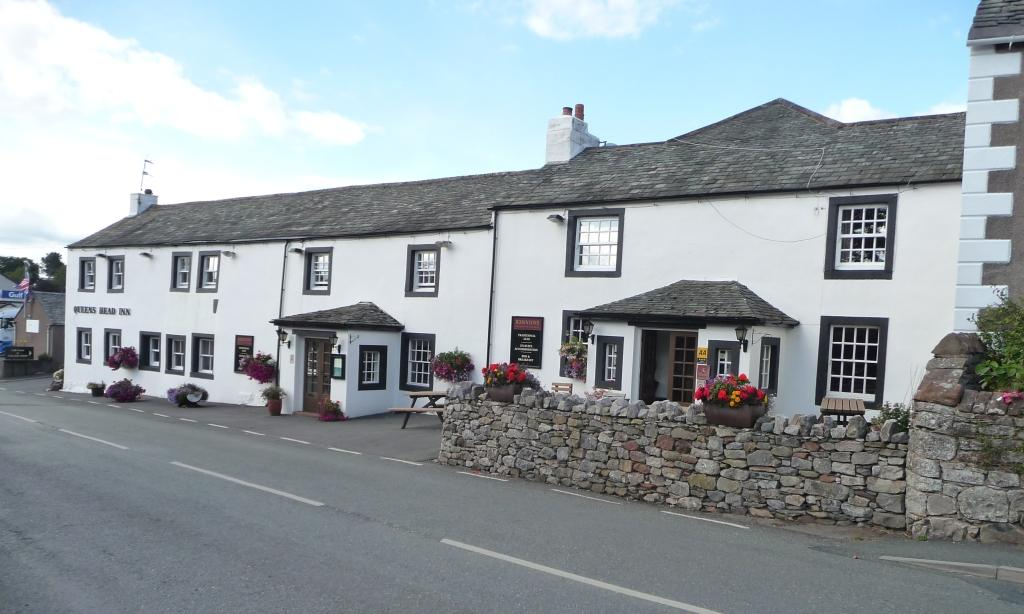
The Queen's Head, Tirril

== See also ==
- Listed buildings in Sockbridge and Tirril
