= Listed buildings in Crackenthorpe =

Crackenthorpe is a civil parish in Westmorland and Furness, Cumbria, England. It contains six buildings that are recorded in the National Heritage List for England. Of these, one is listed at Grade II*, the middle of the three grades, and the others are at Grade II, the lowest grade. The parish contains the village of Crackenthorpe and the surrounding countryside. The listed buildings comprise a country house, four associated structures, and a milestone.

== Key ==
Grade	Criteria
II*	Particularly important buildings of more than special interest
II	Buildings of national importance and special interest

== Buildings ==
Name and location	Photograph	Date	Notes	Grade
Crackenthorpe Hall; 54.59016°N 2.52457°W	—	Early 17th century	A country house that was re-fronted in 1685 and extended in the 1880s. It is in pebbledashed stone with rusticated quoins and a string course, and has slate roofs with stone copings. The main front has two storeys with attics, and is symmetrical with five bays. The central three bays project forward under a dentilled pediment. The doorway has an architrave and above it is a rusticated frieze and a pediment. The main windows on the front are mullioned and transomed, and those in the attic are mullioned. At the rear is a stair wing, and the windows are sashes. The 19th-century additions are in a similar style.	II*
Milestone; 54.59110°N 2.52153°W	—	Late 18th or early 19th century (probable)	The milestone was provided for the Brough to Eamont Bridge turnpike, and was moved to the A66 road when its route was altered. It is in cast iron with a sandstone backing block. There are angled faces inscribed with the distances in miles to Appleby and to Penrith.	II
Coach house, Crackenthorpe Hall; 54.59039°N 2.52493°W	—	Late 19th century	The coach house has stabling below and a billiard room at the north end. It is in stone with quoins, and has a slate roof with stone copings and a central conical vent. There are two storeys and a symmetrical front with nine bays containing five doors and four windows, all with segmental heads. The billiard room has mullioned windows with hood moulds, and the coach door has a segmental head.	II
Summer house, Crackenthorpe Hall; 54.59023°N 2.52499°W	—	1891	The summer house is in the garden of the hall. It is in sandstone and has a slate roof. The summer house has four unfluted Roman Doric columns with a pediment containing stylised triglyphs and a central datestone.	II
Fountain head, Crackenthorpe Hall; 54.59004°N 2.52462°W	—	Late 19th or early 20th century	The fountain head, in the garden of the hall, is by Feodora Gleichen. The central spout is in the mouth of a bearded man with ram's horns. The bottom of the panel is shell-shaped and it contains two small cherubs. At the rear is an inscribed panel.	II
Turbine house, Crackenthorpe Hall; 54.58794°N 2.52381°W	—	1912	The turbine house is built across a stream, it is in stone with quoins, and has a slate roof with projecting eaves. There are two storeys. Above the door, under a pointed hood mould, is a panel with a coat of arms. The windows are mullioned, and there is a datestone.	II

== Notes and references ==
=== Sources ===
- Historic England, "Crackenthorpe Hall, Crackenthorpe (1225826)", National Heritage List for England
- Historic England, "Milestone to north-east of Crackenthorpe Hall, Crackenthorpe (1225905)", National Heritage List for England
- Historic England, "Coach house to north-west of Crackenthorpe Hall, Crackenthorpe (1225805)", National Heritage List for England
- Historic England, "Summer-house to west of Crackenthorpe Hall, Crackenthorpe (1266174)", National Heritage List for England
- Historic England, "Fountain-head in garden to south-west of Crackenthorpe Hall, Crackenthorpe (1225886)", National Heritage List for England
- Historic England, "Turbine-house to south of Crackenthorpe Hall, Crackenthorpe (1225806)", National Heritage List for England
- Historic England, Listed Buildings
- Hyde, Matthew; Pevsner, Nikolaus (2010) [1967], Cumbria, The Buildings of England, New Haven and London: Yale University Press, ISBN 978-0-300-12663-1
