= The Queen's College, Oxford =

College of the University of Oxford

The Queen's College
- University of Oxford
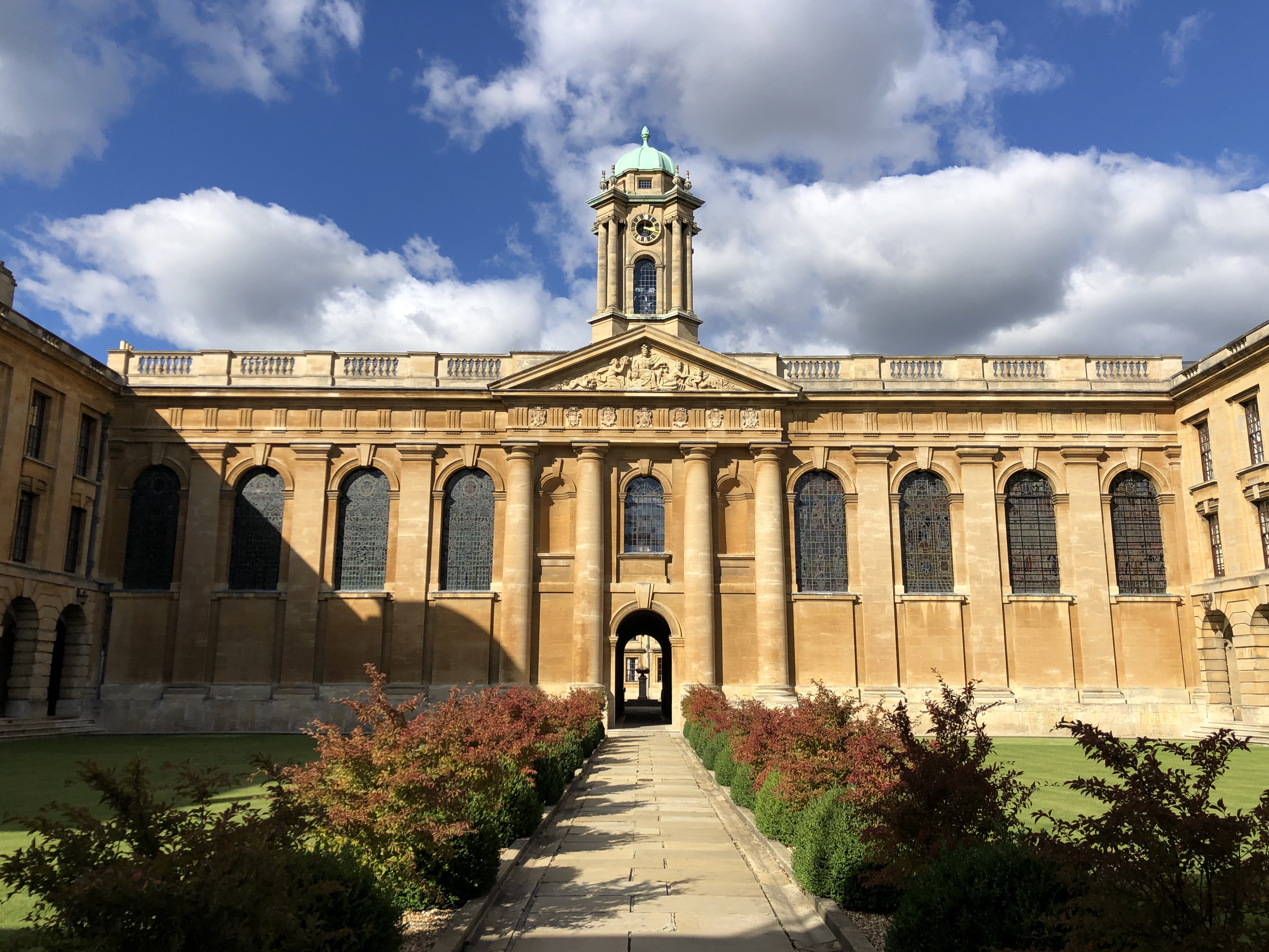

- Arms: Argent, three eagles displayed gules, beaked and legged or, on the breast of the first, a mullet of six points of the last.
- Location: High Street, Oxford
- Coordinates: 51°45′12″N 01°15′04″W
- Full name: The Provost and Scholars of The Queen's College in the University of Oxford
- Latin name: Collegium Reginae
- Motto: Reginae erunt nutrices tuae
- Established: 1341; 685 years ago
- Named for: Philippa of Hainault
- Sister college: Pembroke College, Cambridge
- Provost: Paul Johnson
- Undergraduates: 360 (2024–25)
- Postgraduates: 185 (2024–25)
- Endowment: £327.8 million (2022)
- Website: www.queens.ox.ac.uk
- Boat club: www.qcbcoxford.com

Map
- Location within Oxford city centre

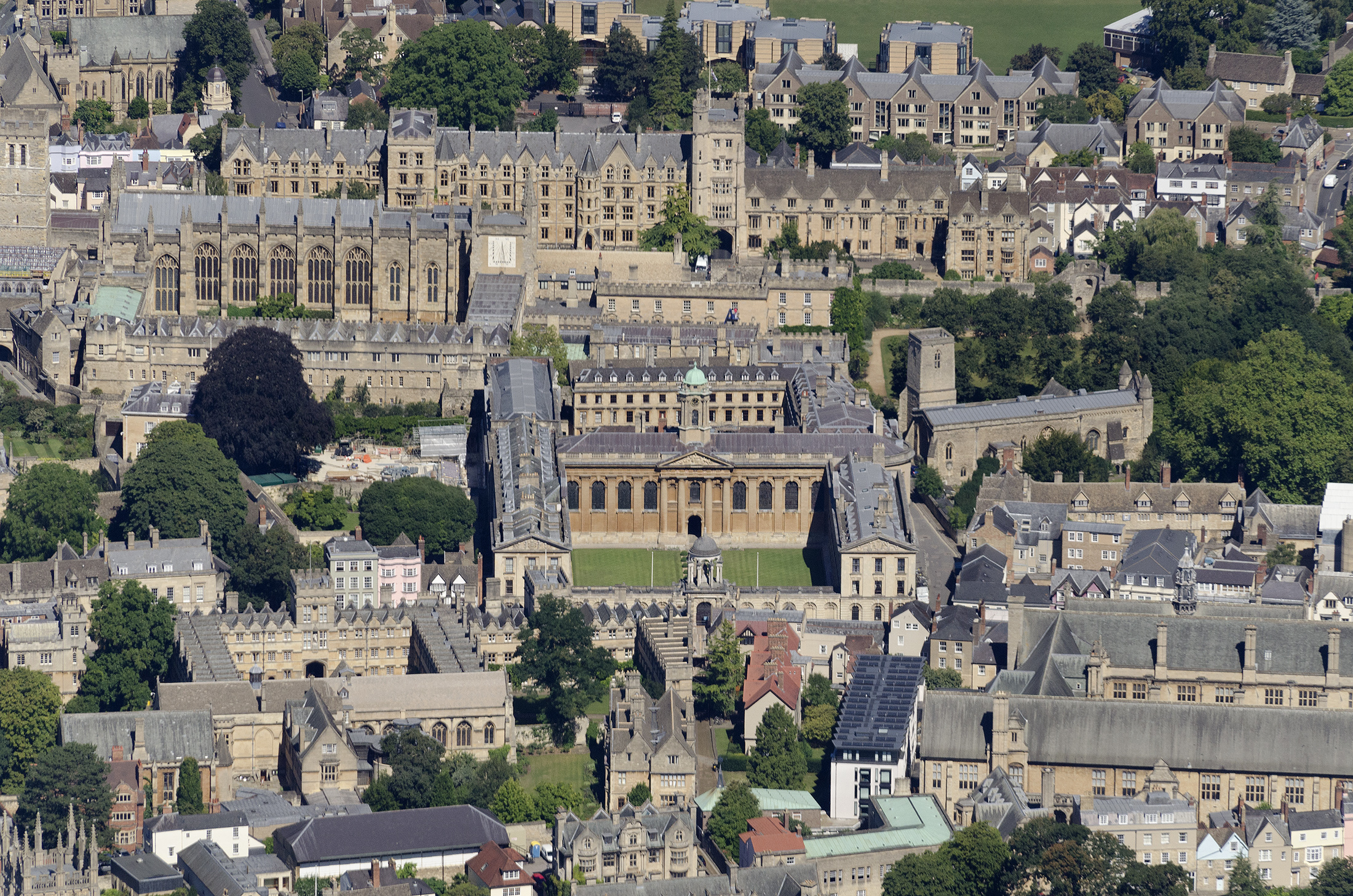
Aerial view of The Queen's College, Oxford

The Queen's College is a constituent college of the University of Oxford, England. The college was founded in 1341 by Robert de Eglesfield in honour of Philippa of Hainault, queen of England. It is distinguished by its predominantly neoclassical architecture, primarily dating from the 18th century.

As of 2022, the college had an endowment of £327.8 million making it the fifth-wealthiest Oxford college (after Christ Church, Magdalen, St. John's, and All Souls).

== History ==
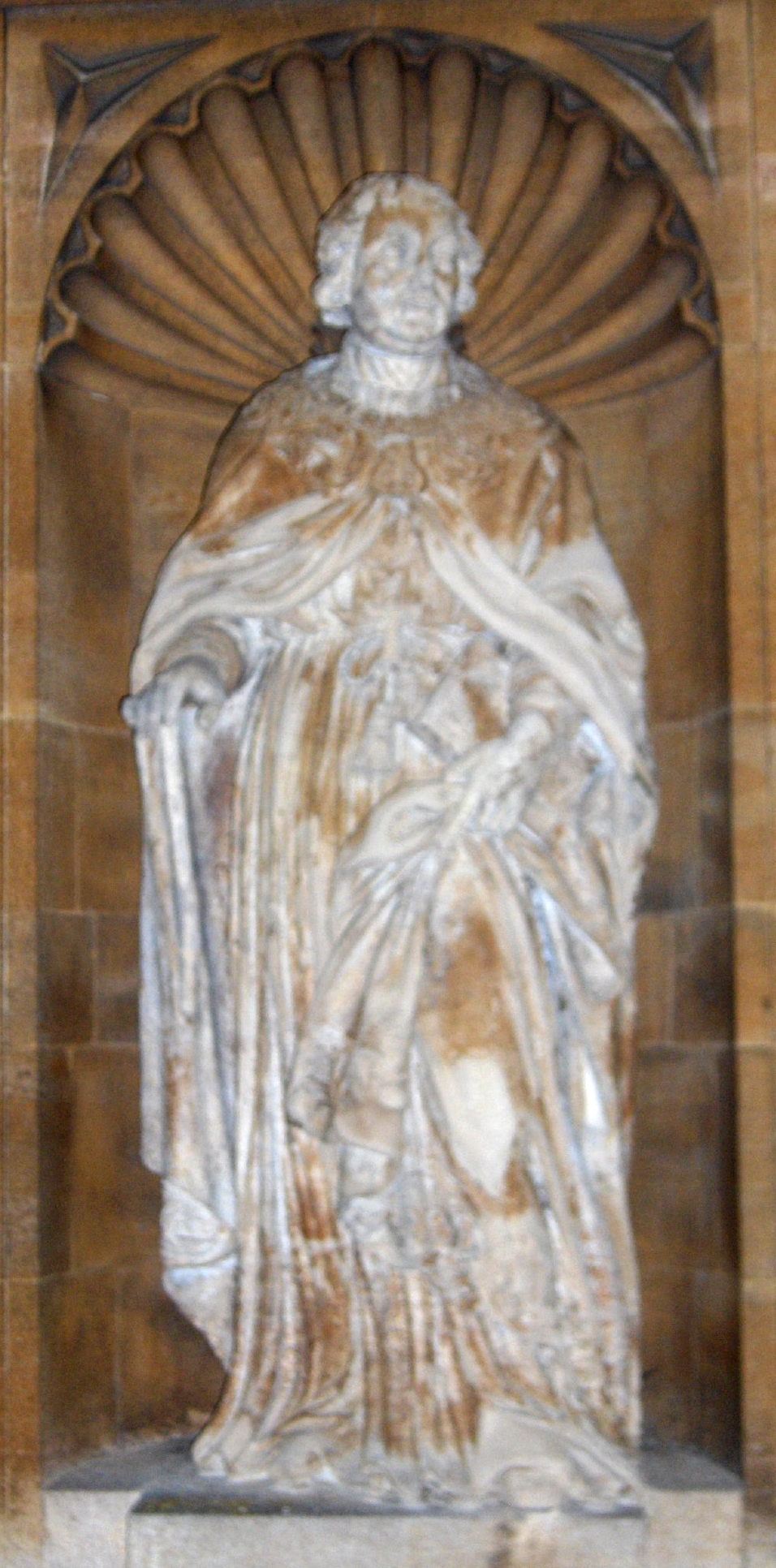
Statue of Robert de Eglesfield in the Provost's garden

The college was founded in 1341 as "Hall of the Queen's scholars of Oxford" by Robert de Eglesfield (d'Eglesfield), chaplain to the then queen consort Philippa of Hainault, after whom the hall was named. The queen consort continues to be the patroness of the college by tradition. Robert's aim was to provide clergymen for his native Cumberland and where he lived in Westmorland (both part of modern Cumbria). In addition, the college was to provide charity for the poor. The college's coat of arms is that of the founder; it differs slightly from his family's coat of arms, which did not include the gold star on the breast of the first eagle. The current coat of arms was adopted by d'Eglesfield because he was unable to use his family's arms, being the younger son. D'Eglesfield had grand plans for the college, with a provost, 12 fellows studying theology, up to 13 chaplains, and 72 poor boys. However, the college did not have the funding to support such numbers, and initially had just two fellows.

Queen's College, Oxford Act 1584
- Act of Parliament
- Parliament of England
- Long title: An Act for confirmation of her Majesty's letters patents to Queen's College in Oxford.
- Citation: 27 Eliz. 1. c. 2 Pr. (Note: This is the citation in The Statutes of the Realm.); 27 Eliz. 1. c. 1 Pr. (Note: This is the citation in The Statutes at Large.)
- Territorial extent: England and Wales

Dates
- Royal assent: 14 September 1585

Status: Current legislation

The college gained land and patronage in the mid-15th century, giving it a good endowment and allowing it to expand to 10 fellows by the end of the century. By 1500, the college had started to take paying undergraduates, typically sons of the gentry and middle class, who paid the fellows for teaching. There were 14 of these in 1535; by 1612, this had risen to 194. The college added lectureships in Greek and philosophy. Provost Henry Robinson obtained the Queen's College, Oxford Act 1584 (27 Eliz. 1. c. 2 Pr.), an act of Parliament incorporating the college as "The Queen's College" in 1585.

Following the new foundation, the college had a good reputation and flourished until the 1750s. Joseph Williamson, who had been admitted as a poor boy and went on to become a fellow, rose to Secretary of State and amassed a fortune. He funded a new range on Queen's Lane built in 1671–72. Following a bequest of books from Thomas Barlow, a new library was built between 1693 and 1696 by master builder John Townesend. A further bequest from Williamson of £6,000, along with purchase of the buildings along the High Street, allowed a new front quad to be built and for the remaining medieval buildings to be replaced. This was completed by 1759 by John's son William Townesend. The college gained a large number of benefactions during this time, which helped to pay for the buildings and bring in more scholars from other, mostly northern, towns.

From the 1750s, as with other Oxford colleges, standards dropped. The Oxford commission of 1850–1859 revised the statutes and removed the northern preference for fellows and most of the students. Over the coming years, requirements for fellows to be unmarried were relaxed, the number of fellows required to have taken orders and studied theology was reduced, and the Universities Tests Act 1871 allowed non-conformists and Catholics.

Like many of Oxford's colleges, Queen's admitted its first mixed-sex cohort in 1979, after more than six centuries as an institution for men only.

=== Naming ===
The college is named for its first patroness, Queen Philippa. Established in January 1341 'under the name of the Hall of the Queen's scholars of Oxford' (sub nomine aule scholarium Regine de Oxon), the college was subsequently called the 'Queen's Hall', 'Queenhall' and 'Queen's College'. The Queen's College, Oxford Act 1584 (27 Eliz. 1. c. 2 Pr.) sought to end this confusion by providing that it should be called by the one name "the Queen's College";. The full name of the college, as indicated in its annual reports, is The Provost and Scholars of The Queen's College in the University of Oxford. Queens' College in Cambridge positions its apostrophe differently and has no article, as it was named for multiple queens (Margaret of Anjou and Elizabeth Woodville).

=== In popular culture ===
In April 2012, as part of the celebrations of the Diamond Jubilee of Elizabeth II, a series of commemorative stamps was released featuring A-Z pictures of famous British landmarks. The Queen's College's front quad was used on the Q stamp, alongside other landmarks such as the Angel of the North on A and the Old Bailey on O.

=== Traditions ===
One of the most famous feasts of the college is the Boar's Head Gaudy, which originally was the Christmas dinner for members of the college who were unable to return home to the north of England over the Christmas break between terms, but is now a feast for old members of the College on the Saturday before Christmas. The tradition may date back around 600 years, with a break in 1959 and 1960; the earliest written reference is from 1660, at which point it was considered an 'antient custome'. The carol now sung is recorded in largely unchanged form by 1697. Another old feast for alumni is the Needle and Thread Gaudy, wherein the bursar hands a needle and thread (a French pun on 'Eglesfield') to the participants, adjuring them to be frugal; that specific custom, at first for New Year's Day, is known to date back at least to 1697.

== Buildings ==
=== Front Quad ===
The main entrance on the High Street leads to the front quad, which was built between 1709 and 1759. There are symmetrical ranges on the east and west sides, while at the back of the quad is a building containing the chapel and the hall. The architect Nicholas Hawksmoor, a leading figure of the English Baroque style, provided a number of designs that were not used directly but that heavily influenced the final design. In the cupola above the college entrance is a statue of the British queen Caroline of Ansbach by the sculptor Henry Cheere; the legend 'Carolina Regina, 12 November 1733' may be found marking the laying of the foundation stone of the screen wall, which is visible from the High Street.

=== Back Quad ===
A second and older quad lies to the north of the hall and chapel. The west side consists of the library. The east side is the Williamson building, which was originally built to a design by the architect Christopher Wren, known for his work in the English Baroque style, but has been largely rebuilt since then.

=== Chapel ===
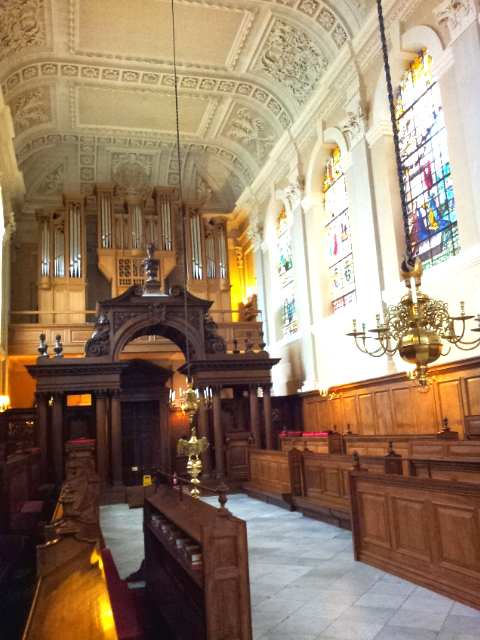
The chapel, looking towards the Frobenius organ

The chapel is noted for its Frobenius organ in the west gallery. It was installed in 1965, replacing a Rushworth and Dreaper organ from 1931. The earliest mention of an organ is 1826. The Chapel Choir has been described as "Oxford's finest mixed-voice choir" and continues to perform termly concerts, recent examples of which include Handel's Messiah, Vivaldi's Gloria, and Bach's Mass in B minor and St John Passion. The current chapel was consecrated by the Archbishop of York in 1719.

The chapel celebrates several rites and services:

- Daily morning and evening prayer.
- Communion every Sunday morning; open to all denominations.
- Choral evensong Sunday evenings and on Wednesdays and Fridays during term time.
- Baptism, confirmation, and weddings for college members and alumni.
- Occasional broadcasts such as choral matins on the BBC on June 29, 2025.

Choir services are livestreamed on YouTube.

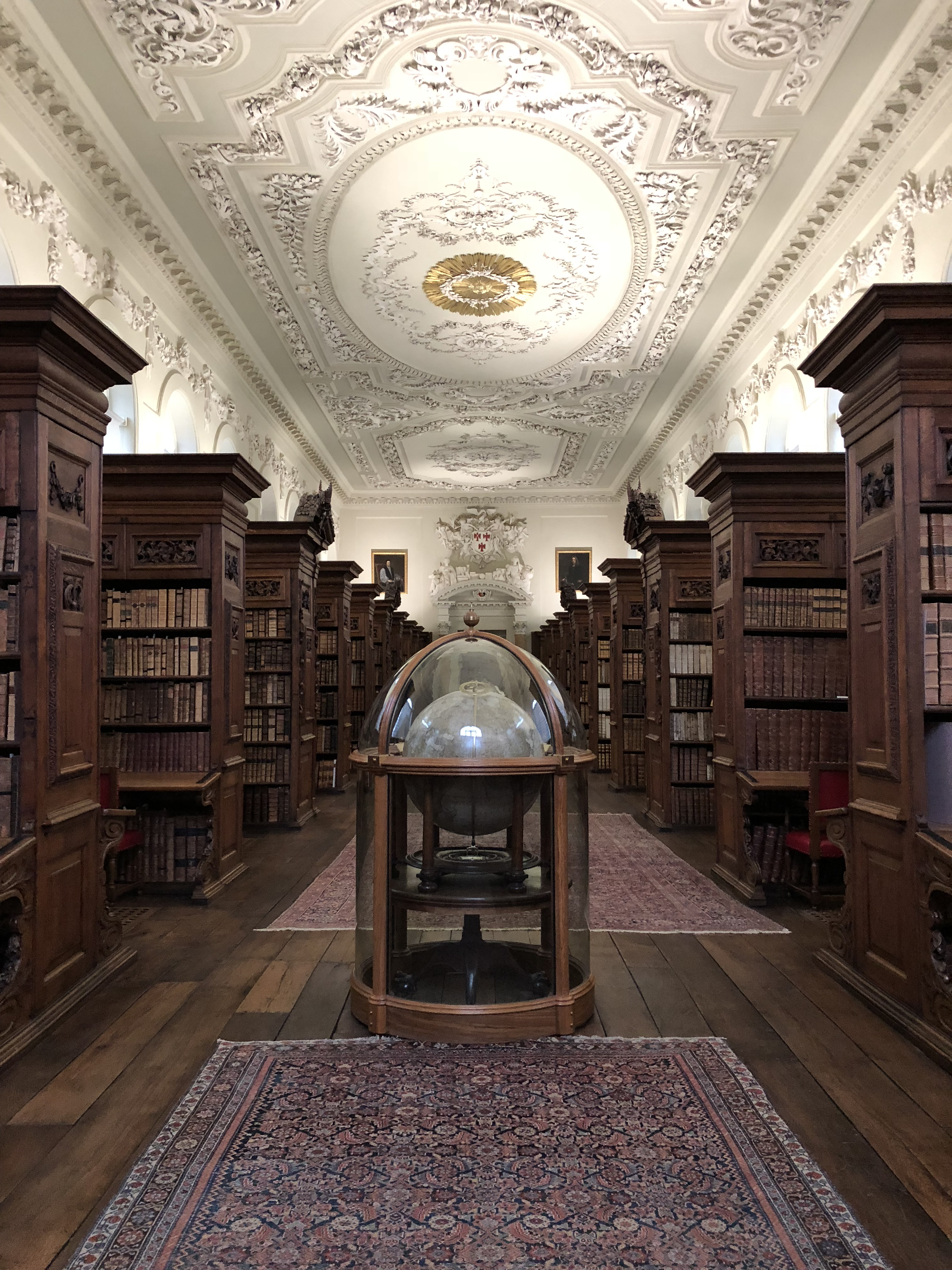
The Baroque Upper Library (feat. one of the C18 Senex globes)

=== Library ===
==== The Upper Library ====
The Upper Library has been a focal point for the college ever since its construction at the end of the 17th century. The ceiling plasterwork, its most outstanding feature, was designed by James Hands, whilst the library itself was built by John Townsend. The designer remains unknown, although a likely candidate is Henry Aldrich, who was Bishop of Oxford and Dean of Christ Church, as well as chief communicator between Christopher Wren and the college whilst the Back Quad was being designed. Unlike many other similar rooms in Oxford libraries, the Upper Library remains as a silent reading room for students open during staffed hours.

===== Eighteenth Century Globes and Orrery =====
On display in the middle of the library are two papier-mâché Senex globes, donated to the library in 1747, and an eighteenth-century orrery. John Senex was the foremost globe maker of the eighteenth century; he crafted the miniature globe featured in the orrery as well. The globes are now found in domes (cases) that were designed and fitted by Welsh furniture designer Bernard Allen in 2007, after being removed from the library in 2003 for structural repair and restoration by renowned English globe conservator Sylvia Sumira.

The Benjamin Cole orrery was a gift to the college in 1763 from a Group of Gentleman Commoners of the college, recorded in two entries in the Benefactors' Book, as well as on an inscription in the lunar calendar scale. The instrument is made of brass, steel, and wood, contained within a wooden case and resting on a mahogany stand with a glazed cover. Johnathan Betts, in an Excerpt from A report following the servicing and inspection of The Queen's College Grand Orrery in 2016, describes the instrument as standing

on a fine mahogany table with six finely carved cabriole legs, the whole covered with a multi-panelled protective glass shade which can be locked securely onto the table, preventing access to the orrery.

In the same article, Betts illustrates the orrery,

fitted in a mahogany twelve-sided case, with lacquered brass mounts and surmounted, on a brass pillared gallery, with a large lacquered brass hemispherical armillary structure. The mechanical orrery itself incorporates within its compass the solar system out to Mars, including the Earth and Moon, with additional mountings fixed on the outside of the case for attaching static models of Jupiter and Saturn.

The turning of the orrery is a traditional event at Queen's, done by hand only once every few years or on special occasions. Only two people are permitted to turn the orrery: the Patroness of the college and the Sedleian Professor of Natural Philosophy, a Fellow of Queen's. This event most recently took place on 4 February 2020, during the Hilary term, with professor Jonathan Keating as the honorary orrery-turner.

==== The Lower and New Libraries ====
The open cloister below the Upper Library was enclosed in the 19th century to form the Lower Library, which now houses the bulk of the lending collection. The lending collection consists of around 50,000 with an additional 70,000 items in the special collections available by appointment. In April 2017 the New Library opened beneath the Provost's Garden, with an official opening by Old Member Rowan Atkinson taking place in November of the same year.

=== Annexes ===
Queen's is able to provide accommodation for all of its undergraduates, who are divided between the college's main buildings and annexes nearby. Adjacent to college is Carrodus Quad, located just across Queen's Lane. It has been completely refurbished, and now has approximately 80 en-suite rooms for first-year students, as well as a few second- and third-/final-year students with access requirements. The building also houses a conference room, one of the college's music practice rooms (the other one being located in the Back Quad of the main college), and the college gym. The college also owns the Cardo Building opposite the Oxford University Sports centre on Iffley Road (where Roger Bannister ran the first ever four-minute mile in 1954). This building is home to a mixture of second and third years, and features a common room, breakfast room and the college's two squash courts. Near the Cardo Building is the James Street Building, the smallest of the annexes with twelve rooms.

The Florey Building in St Clement's, designed by James Stirling and named after former Queen's Provost and Nobel Prize winner Howard Florey, is a former annex that housed most of the college's first years until 2018, when it was mothballed following complications that arose in attempts to refurbish the building. It contains nearly 80 rooms; those on the top floor have a mezzanine level. At one end of the building on the ground floor, there is a common room and a breakfast room. Following the closure of the Florey Building in 2018, the former post-graduate annex, St Aldate's House, became the largest undergraduate annex at Queen's, with three floors, 90 en suite rooms, and kitchens shared with up to nine other students. The annex is situated down St Aldate's directly opposite Christ Church Meadows, near Folly Bridge.

While many postgraduate students choose to live outside College accommodation, two annexes for post-graduates are available: Oxley-Wright House, which is owned by the college, and a portion of the Venneit Close complex, which is rented from North Oxford Property Services (NOPS). The former is a large Victorian house on Banbury Road, near Summertown, with 13 rooms and a large garden. None of the rooms are en suite, and there are 3 bathrooms in the building, each shared between approximately 4 people. The latter includes 18 apartments, each with three study bedrooms, two bathrooms, a kitchen (with a washing machine) and a dining/sitting room. Both buildings are roughly a 30-minute walk to Queen's.

=== Gallery ===
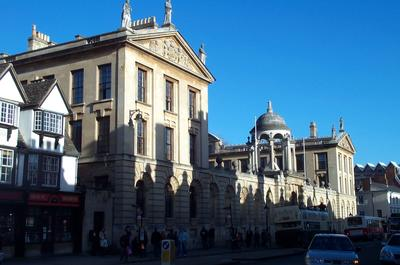
The Queen's College, view from the High Street

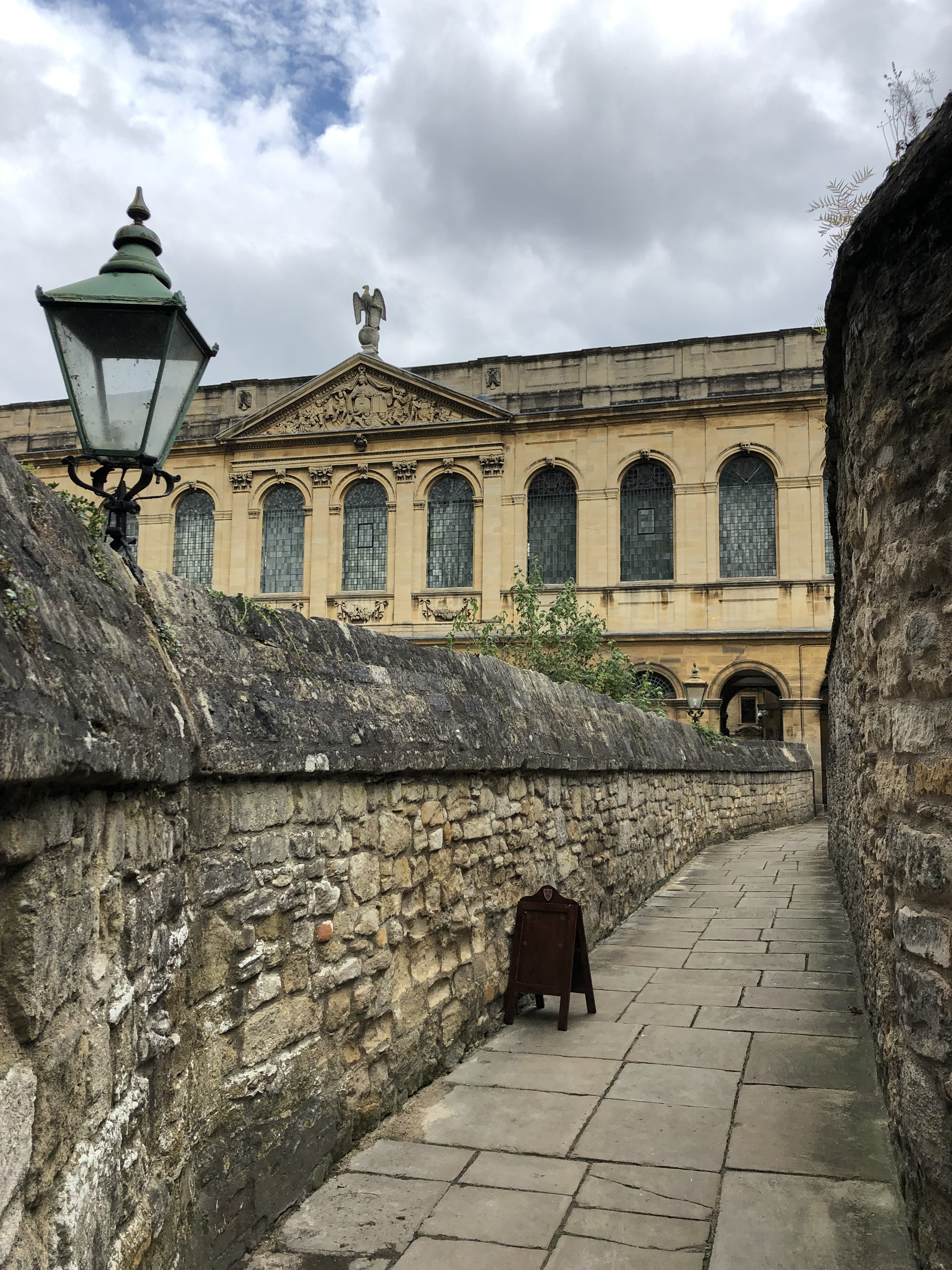
View of the Upper Library, featuring the last remaining part of the medieval college

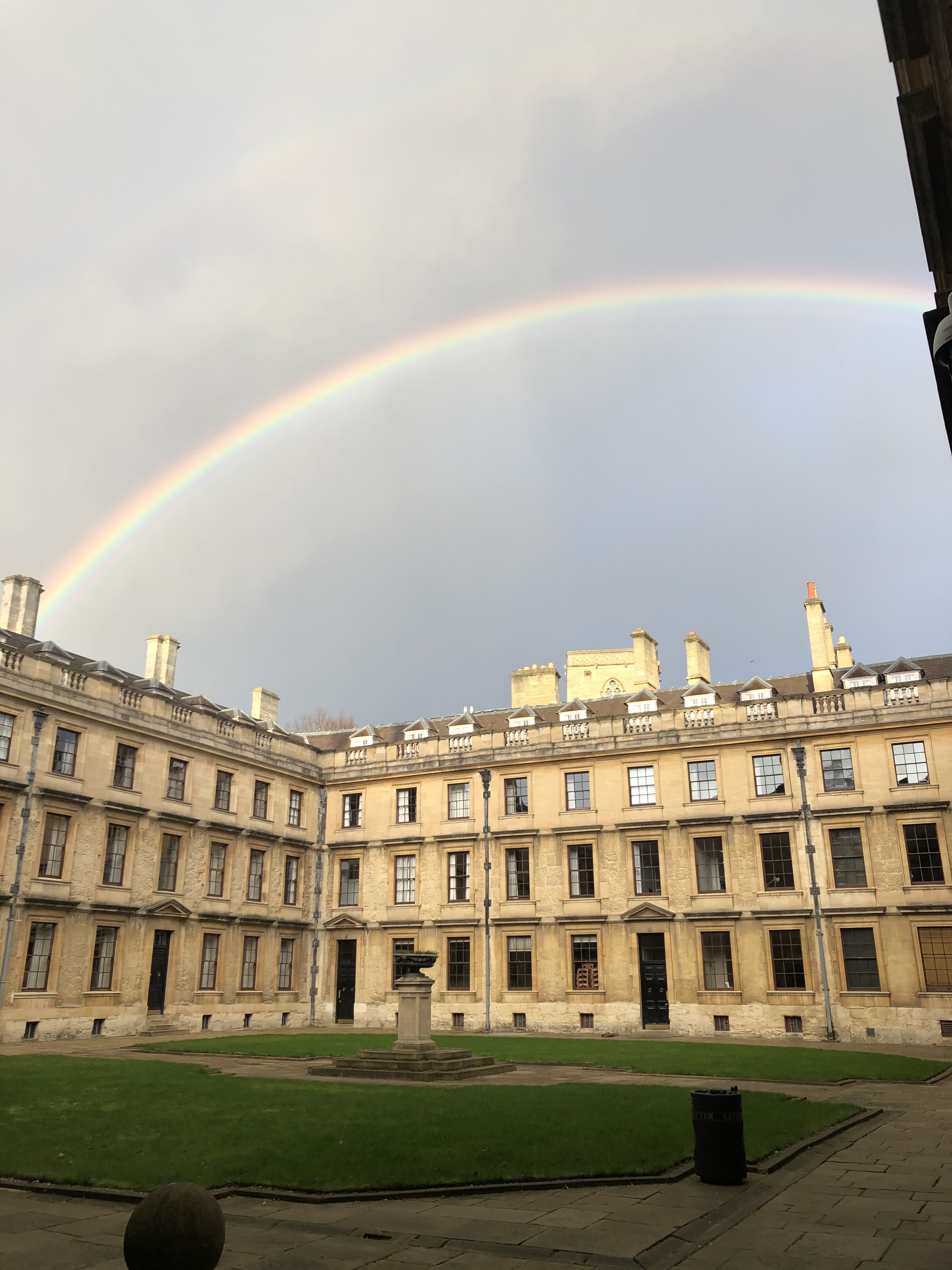
The Queen's College, Back Quad

== Student life ==
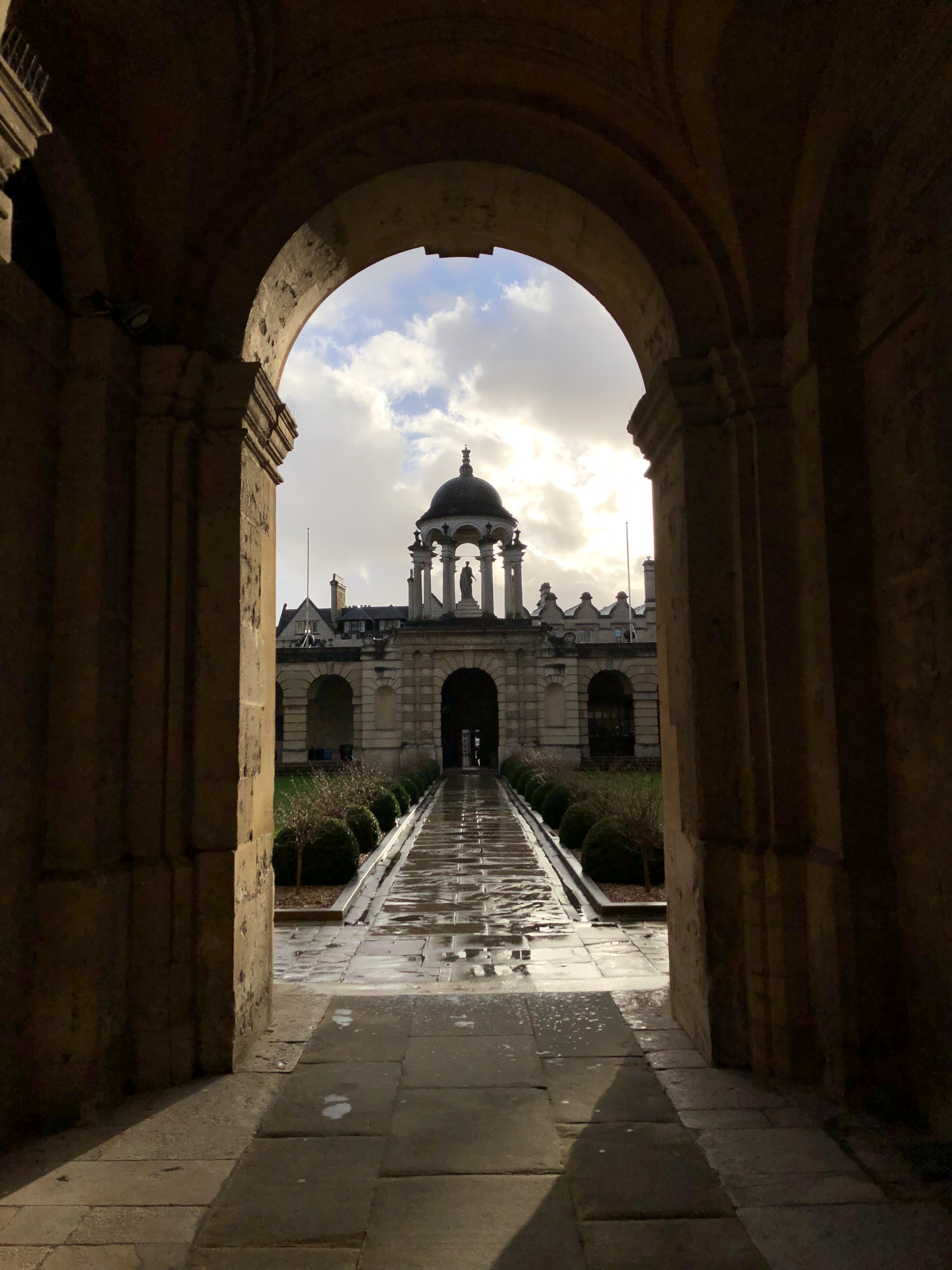
High Street entrance to Queen's College from the Chapel

Queen's is an active community performing strongly in intercollegiate sport competitions, having a variety of societies and, as one of the larger colleges, hosting triennial Commemoration balls. The 2007 ball coincided with the 666th anniversary of the college.

Queen's is host to a number of dining and drinking societies, such as the Eaglets, the Reginae, and the Halcyon, and some which are more academically orientated such as a medical society.

=== The JCR, MCR, and Old Taberdars' Room ===
The Junior Common Room (JCR) consists of the collective body of undergraduates at the college, and also refers to the room under the same name, located in the Back Quad, which is the only common room in the college that cannot be booked. The JCR is not to be confused with the JCR General Committee, which consists of all members of the executive committee, Equalities Committee, and Welfare Committee, all presidents of college societies and the president of the ball committee, as well as the academic & careers representative, access and outreach representative, food representatives, environment & ethics representatives, student union representatives, Stash representative, charities representative, webmasters, arts representative, antisocial secretary (a position passed on in a 'hereditary' manner through one's 'College family'), warden of the beer cellar, and the keeper of the Boars, Bees, and Eagles.

The Middle Common Room (MCR) refers to the postgraduates of the college. Like the JCR, the MCR have an executive team, which includes the president, victualler, vice-president secretary, treasurer, social secretary, SCR liaison officer, LGBTQ+ officer, welfare officer, environment and charities representative, IT officer, sports secretary, Oxford SU representative, first year representative, and Entz representative (the last four positions being empty as of 2020).

The Old Taberdars' Room is described by the college as: a traditional wood-panelled room, furnished with comfortable sofas and chairs. The room is ideal as a lounge space or for informal discussion based session. It is open for use by all members of the college, though it is possible to book it for events such as welcome drinks, pre-dinner drinks, student production rehearsals, and society meetings. A Taberdar is specifically "a holder of a scholarship at Queen's College, Oxford".

=== Sport ===
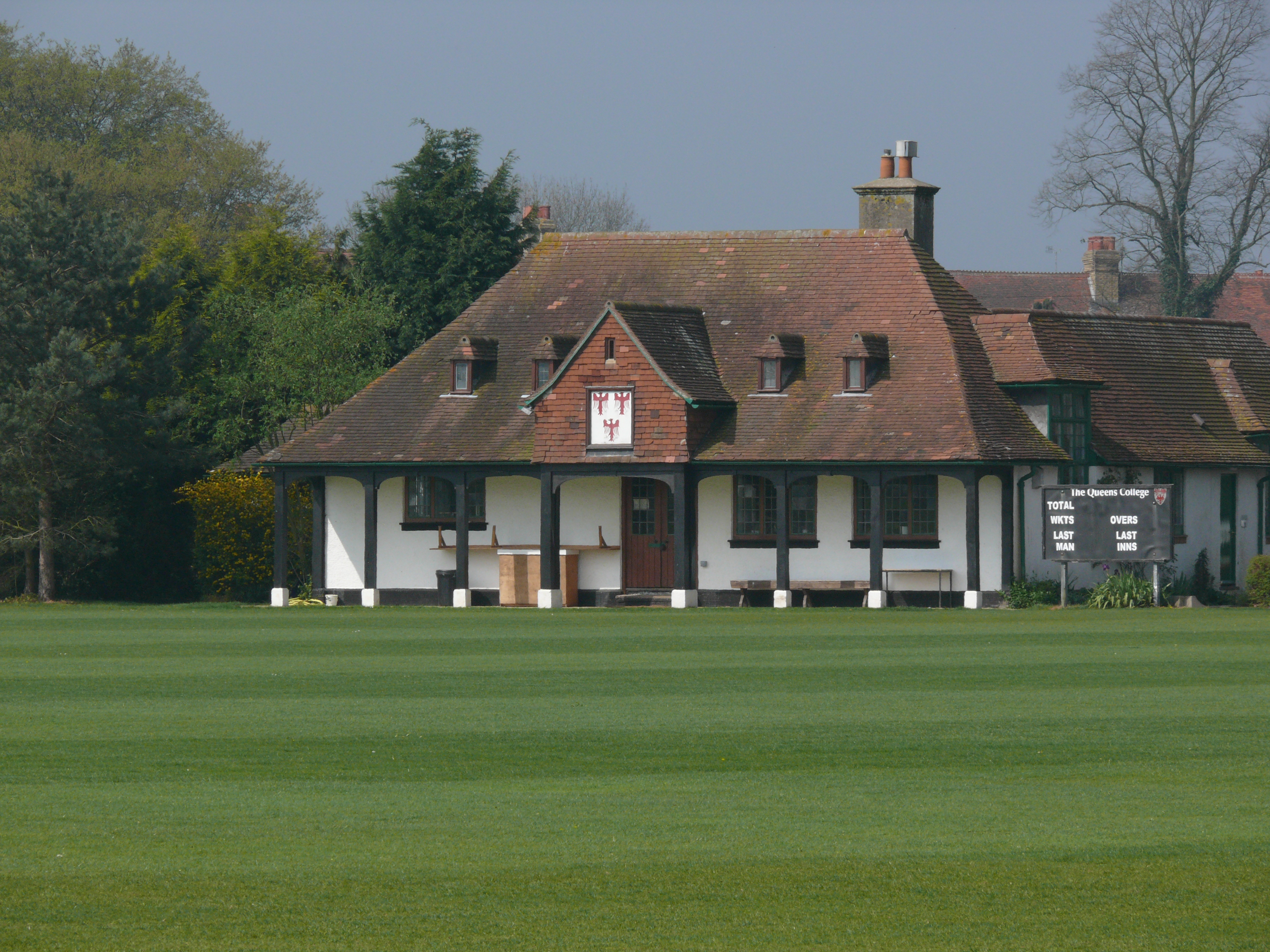
Queen's College pavilion

College sport at Queen's is organised and funded through the Amalgamated Sports Clubs Committee, consisting of individual club captains and other representatives of college sport. The college competes in most of the intercollegiate Cuppers (tournament style) and league sports, including in top divisions.

The college playing field, less than a mile from the main buildings, runs down to the banks of the Isis. It has a football and a hockey pitch, together with hard tennis courts, a netball court and a pavilion. The football ground is nicknamed Fortress Riverside by the club and its supporters, owing to its close proximity to the Isis. The Queen's College shares a rugby pitch nearby with University College. In the summer, the goalposts go down and a cricket square appears in the middle. The college's two squash courts are located at the Cardo Building annex on Iffley Road.

==== Rowing ====
The Queen's College Boat Club was founded in 1827 and is one of the oldest boat clubs in the world. In 1837, QCBC represented Oxford in a Boat Race against Lady Margaret Boat Club, representing Cambridge, and won. This event, held on the River Thames at Henley-on-Thames, is credited with contributing to support from the town for the establishment of the Henley Royal Regatta in 1839. The college's colours were changed thereafter from red and white to navy blue and white, the colours of the university.

Queen's shares its boathouse with Oriel and Lincoln colleges. Rowing is still a major sport in the college, with the men's first boat winning blades in Torpids 2021 and the women's first boat winning blades in both Torpids 2023 and Summer Eights 2023. The college was Head of the river in Torpids and Eights in 1958.

=== Music ===
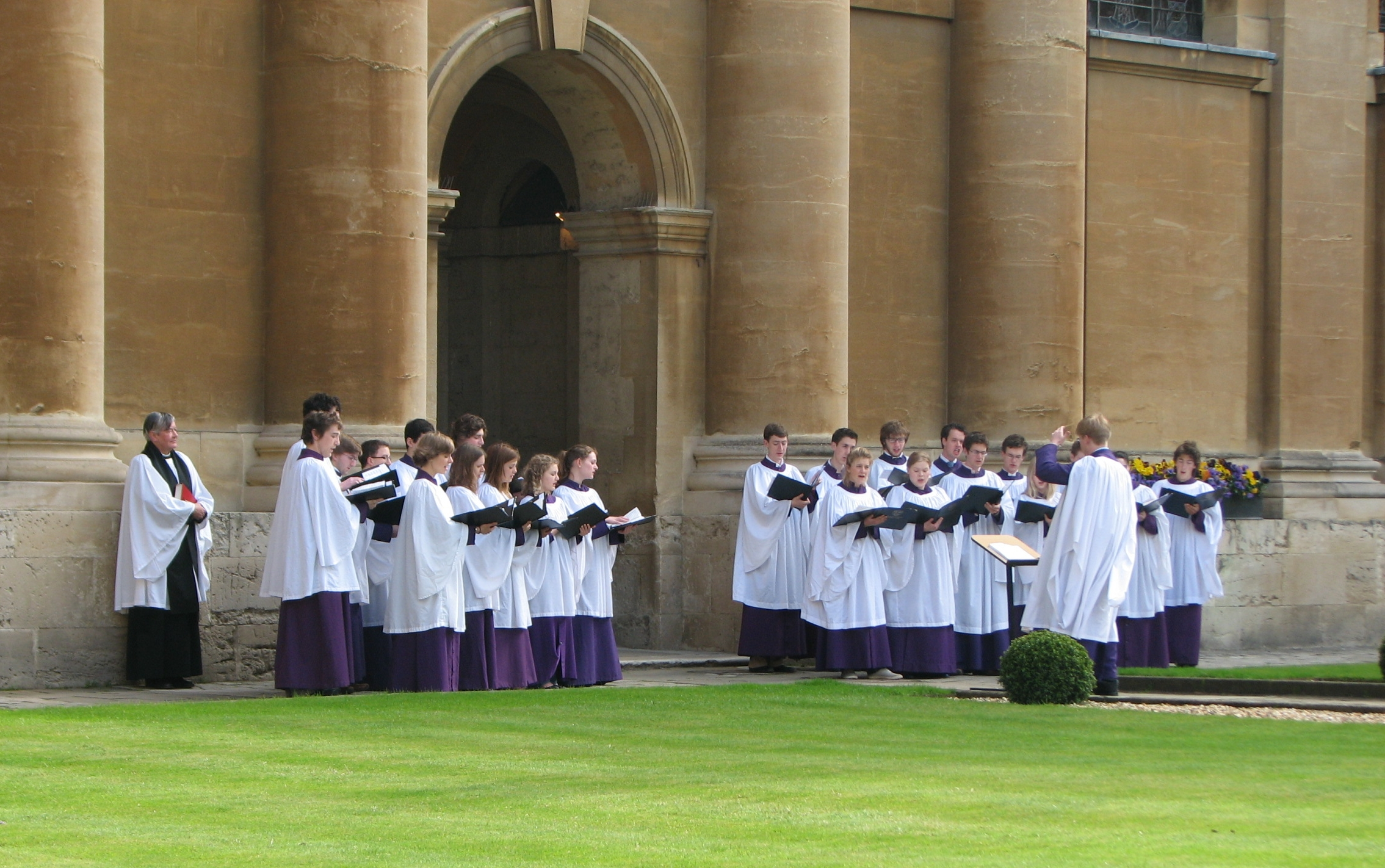
The choir performing in the Front Quad on Ascension morning 2009

The Queen's College is host to a mixed-voice Chapel Choir. The singers include Choral Scholars (up to eighteen at any one time) and volunteers, all of whom are auditioned. The Choir sings Evensong three times a week during term, and performs one major concert each term, often with a noted orchestral ensemble. The choir also undertakes regular tours and short visits both within this country and abroad. The Eglesfield Musical Society, named after the founder, is the oldest musical society in Oxford. It organises a substantial series of concerts each year, ranging from chamber music to orchestral works.

=== College Grace ===
As is the case with many Oxbridge colleges, Queen's uses a Latin grace which is recited every evening before the second sitting of dinner:

Benedic nobis, Domine Deus, et his donis, quae ex liberalitate Tua sumpturi sumus; per Jesum Christum Dominum nostrum. Amen.

A rough English translation: "Bless us, Lord God, and these gifts which we are about to receive through your bounty; through Jesus Christ, our Lord, Amen"

== Notable people ==
=== Notable alumni ===
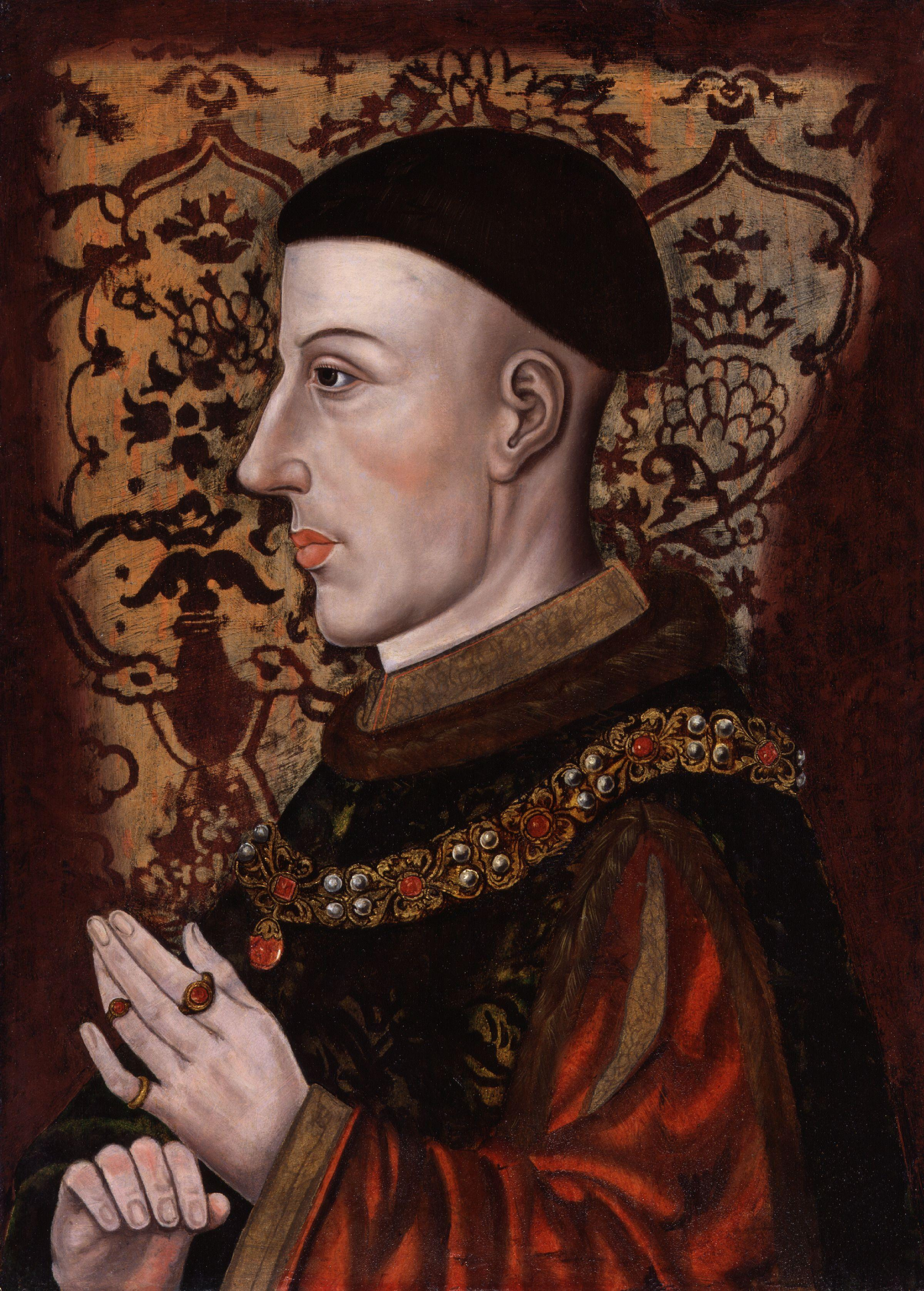
Henry V

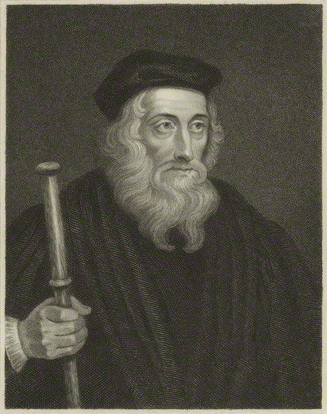
John Wycliffe

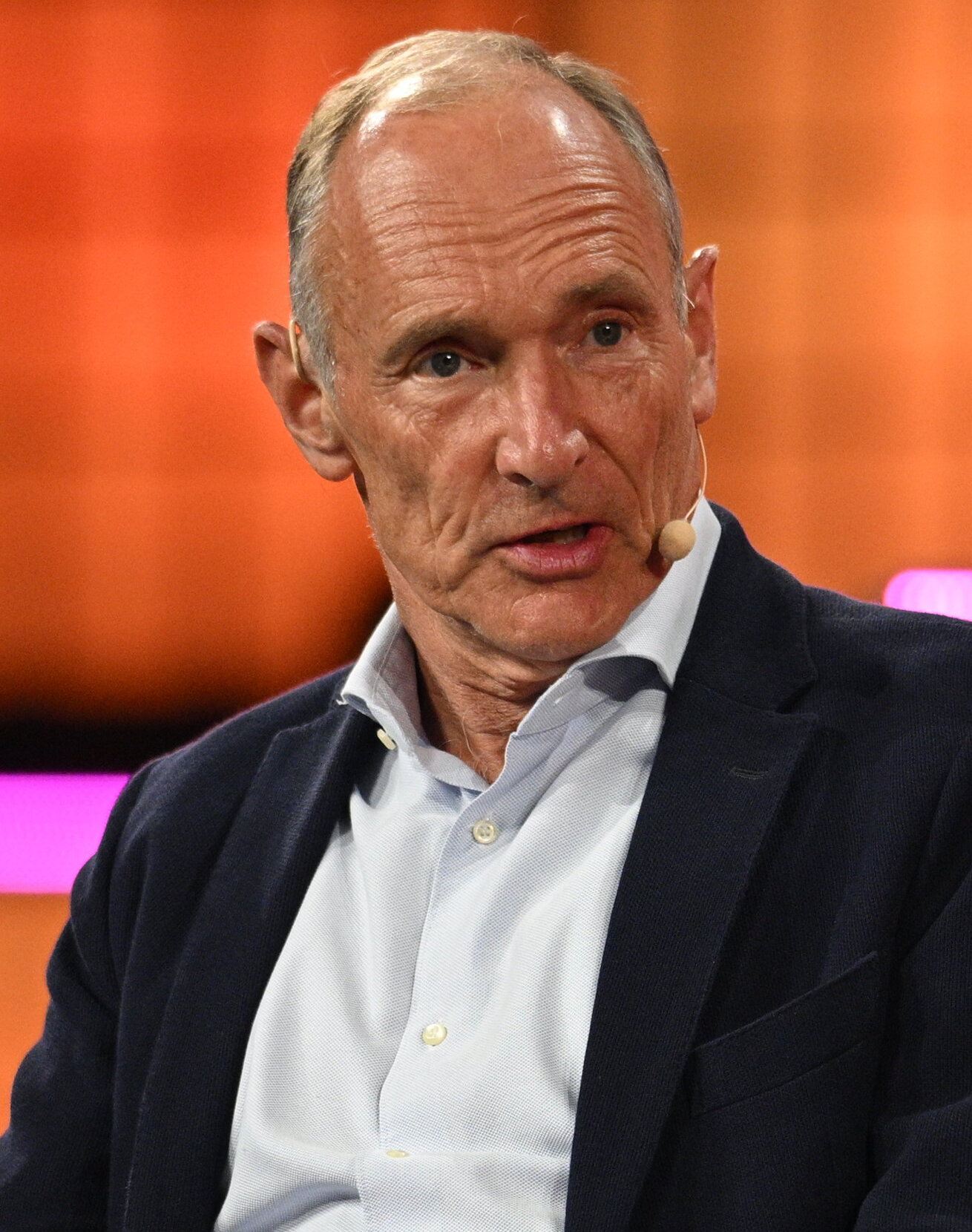
Tim Berners-Lee

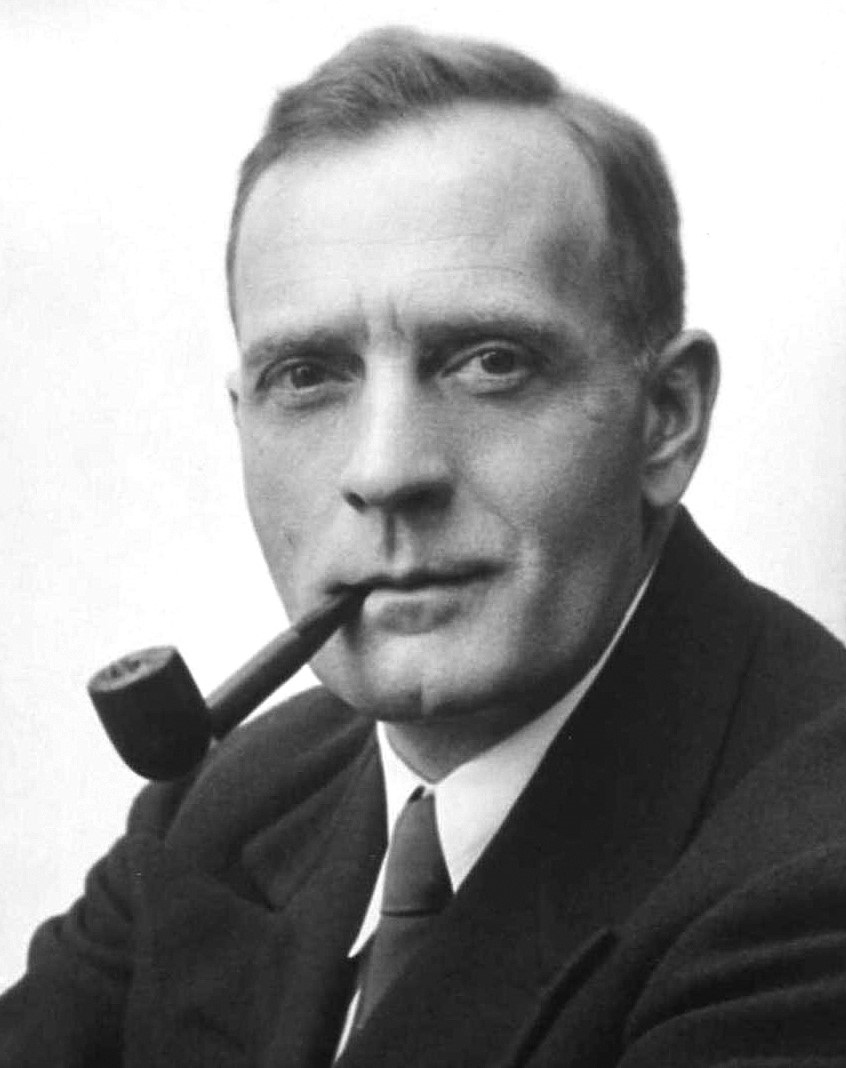
Edwin Hubble

- Tony Abbott, 28th Prime Minister of Australia
- Barbara Frances Ackah-Yensu, Justice of the Supreme Court of Ghana
- Joseph Addison, co-founder of The Spectator
- Rowan Atkinson, actor and comedian, known for Blackadder and Mr. Bean
- Michael Barber FRS, chemist and mass spectrometrist
- Jeremy Bentham, English philosopher, and legal and social reformer
- Tim Berners-Lee, inventor of the World Wide Web and director of the World Wide Web Consortium
- Wilfred Bion, British psychoanalyst
- Christopher Bland, British businessman and politician
- Cory Booker, United States Senator from New Jersey
- Desmond Cecil, British diplomat (CMG), civil nuclear adviser
- Vere Gordon Childe, Archaeologist, socialist, excavator of Skara Brae and Maes Howe
- Clayton Christensen, American business academic known for coining "disruptive innovation"
- Myles Cooper, 2nd President of Columbia University
- Frank Cowper, English yachtsman and author
- John Crewdson, Pulitzer Prize-winning journalist for The New York Times
- Peter Daniell MP, Member of Parliament
- Ernest Dowson, English poet and prose writer
- Alfred Enoch, English actor
- Howard Florey, Lord Florey, Nobel Laureate and co-developer of penicillin, later Provost of the college
- Oliver Franks, Baron Franks, civil servant and philosopher, Provost of The Queen's College, later Provost of Worcester College
- Eric Garcetti, Mayor of Los Angeles
- Herbert Branston Gray, educationalist
- Leonard Hoffmann, Baron Hoffmann, English jurist and judge
- Edmund Halley, English astronomer
- Fred Halliday, Irish academic, Fellow of the British Academy, Montague Burton Professor of International Relations at London School of Economics
- John Heath-Stubbs, English poet and editor
- King Henry V of England
- Edwin Powell Hubble, American astronomer
- Ruth Kelly, former UK Cabinet and Government Minister
- Kenneth Leighton, twentieth-century English composer
- John Henry Mee, nineteenth-century English composer
- Thomas Middleton, English Jacobean playwright and poet
- John Milbank, Anglican Theologian
- David Moule-Evans, twentieth-century English composer
- David Oliver, Geriatrician. Professor of Medicine for Older People at City University. Former National Clinical Director for Older People Department of Health. President British Geriatrics Society. Visiting Fellow The King's Fund
- John Owen, seventeenth-century English theologian
- Brian Paddick, twice Liberal Democrat candidate for Mayor of London
- Walter Horatio Pater, English essayist
- Richard Rampton, barrister in high-profile cases such as Irving v Penguin Books and Lipstadt, which was the subject of the film Denial
- Benedict Read, art historian
- Ryan Max Riley, United States Ski Team skier
- Gilbert Ryle, British philosopher
- Oliver Sacks, neurologist and writer
- Barnabas Simpson, English clergyman
- Leopold Stokowski, conductor
- Nino Strachey, writer and historian
- Claire Taylor, English cricketer
- William Thomson, Archbishop of York
- Phil Venables, British computer scientist and security specialist
- Charles Leslie Wrenn, English scholar and a Rawlinson and Bosworth Professor of Anglo-Saxon at Pembroke College, Oxford
- John Wycliffe, English theologian
- Adam Zamoyski, historian and author
- Edward Bradbrooke, English athlete

=== Provosts ===
Economist Paul Johnson has served as the Provost of Queen's since 2 August 2025.

== See also ==
- The Neda Agha-Soltan Graduate Scholarship
