= Brampton, Westmorland and Furness =

Village in Cumbria, England

Coordinates: 54.605°N 2.503°W

Brampton
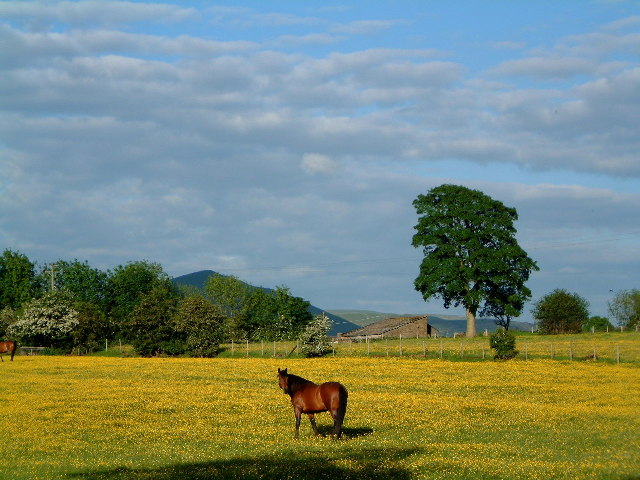
- Fields at Brampton

- Location in the former Eden District, Cumbria Location within Cumbria
- OS grid reference: NY674234
- Civil parish: Long Marton
- Unitary authority: Westmorland and Furness
- Ceremonial county: Cumbria
- Region: North West
- Country: England
- Sovereign state: United Kingdom
- Post town: APPLEBY-IN-WESTMORLAND
- Postcode district: CA16
- Dialling code: 01697
- Police: Cumbria
- Fire: Cumbria
- Ambulance: North West
- UK Parliament: Westmorland and Lonsdale

Brampton is a village in the Westmorland and Furness district, in the county of Cumbria, England. Before 1974 it was in the county of Westmorland; the nearest town is Appleby-in-Westmorland.

== Toponymy ==
The place-name 'Brampton' is first attested in a Foot of Fines from 1208, where it appears as Branton. It appears as Brampton in the Close Rolls of 1283. The name derives from the Old English 'Brōm-tūn', meaning 'town or settlement where broom grew'.

== Geography and Location ==
Brampton is located 2.41 km north east of Appleby-in-Westmorland. A stream known as Brampton Beck runs in front of Brampton to the east in what is a forest known as Brampton Gill. 360 metres south west of Brampton is Croft Ends, a small hamlet, and 1.8 km east is the village of Dufton.

== History ==
Brampton is spelt in Christopher Saxton’s 1579 map of Westmorland and Cumberland as 'Branton'. The same name is mentioned again in Schenk and Valck’s 1670 map. In John Cary’s map of 1794 'Bramton' is marked, however the first cartographic mention of the village's current name comes from an 1831 map of the area.

Brampton Hall and barn is a Grade II listed building in the village dating from the 17th century. There are a number of other historic buildings and houses in the area including the New Inn, a public house dating from 1730, Town-end farmhouse (which was built in 1736), Midtown Farm from 1740, and most notably the nearby Brampton water mill and stables, which were most likely constructed during the late 18th century. Not too far away public hangings were reputedly held at what is now Hanginshaw Farm.

Nearby Brampton Tower is located near Croft Ends along with Clickham Farm and an old chapel known as Esplanadhill. The tower is an example of Gothic Revival architecture which became popular during the 19th century. Goods shed and weighbridge offices were also built during this period (1873). Circa 1870, Brampton village had a population of 304 as recorded in the Imperial Gazetteer of England and Wales.

== See also ==
- Listed buildings in Long Marton
