= Listed buildings in Sockbridge and Tirril =

Sockbridge and Tirril is a civil parish in Westmorland and Furness, Cumbria, England. It contains 27 listed buildings that are recorded in the National Heritage List for England. All the listed buildings are designated at Grade II, the lowest of the three grades, which is applied to "buildings of national importance and special interest". The parish contains the adjacent villages of Sockbridge and Tirril and the surrounding countryside. Most of the listed buildings are in the villages, and are mainly houses and associated structures, farmhouses and farm buildings. The other listed buildings in the villages are a cross base and a public house, and outside the village they are a boundary post and a farmhouse.

== Buildings ==
Name and location	Photograph	Date	Notes
Sockbridge Hall; 54.63600°N 2.77059°W	—	Mid to late 16th century (probable)	The farmhouse was altered and extended in the 17th and 18th centuries. It is in rendered stone and has a slate roof with coped gables, the south gable being crow-stepped with roll moulded coping. There are two storeys and four irregular bays. The windows vary; most are mullioned, some are also transomed, some are casements, and some are round-headed. The main doorway has an architrave.
Former gatehouse, Sockbridge Hall; 54.63590°N 2.77038°W	—	Late 16th century (probable)	The building is in stone and has a slate roof with coped gables. The south front has two storeys and three bays, and contains a central through passage with a Tudor arch. The windows in the ground floor are mullioned, and in the upper floor they are transomed with hood moulds. There is a doorway with a chamfered surround and a triangular head, and a first floor door approached by steps.
Cross base 54.63274°N 2.77047°W	—	17th century (probable)	The cross base is in the centre of the village green. It is in sandstone, and consists of a triangular plinth with two steps, and it contains a round socket hole.
Stone House; 54.63438°N 2.77607°W	—	17th century	A stone house with quoins and a slate roof. It has a single storey at the front and a loft at the rear, and three bays. In the centre is a doorway, and this is flanked by mullioned windows.
Stone House Barn; 54.63432°N 2.77593°W	—	17th century (probable)	The barn is in stone with quoins, a slate roof, two storeys and three bays. It has a doorway with a chamfered surround, ventilation slits, a first-floor loft door, and a loft door on the east face.
Grove Farmhouse; 54.63240°N 2.76975°W	—	Mid or late 17th century	Formerly a farmhouse, later a private house, it is rendered and has a green slate roof. There are two storeys, four bays, a two-bay stable conversion to the right, and a rear extension. The doorway has a stone surround, in the ground floor are mullioned windows with hood moulds, and in the upper floor windows the mullions have been removed.
Tirril Hall; 54.63193°N 2.76937°W	—	Late 17th century (probable)	A house that was later extended, it is in roughcast stone with a slate roof. There are two storeys, a front of six irregular bays, and a single-bay rear extension. The ground floor windows are mullioned, and in the upper floor some windows have lost their mullions and contain casements. The rear extension has a hipped roof, an outshut, sash windows, and a round-headed stair window. Also at the rear is another outshut with a catslide roof.
Barn, Sockbridge Hall; 54.63569°N 2.77144°W	—	1679	The barn is in stone with a slate roof. In the east front are nine entrances with chamfered surrounds, most of which have been converted into windows. There are also two winnowing doors, a central segmental-headed cart entrance, external stone steps, and two tiers of ventilation slits.
Outbuilding, Sockbridge Hall; 54.63550°N 2.77062°W	—	1687	Originally a stable, it is in stone with a slate roof, two storeys, and an L-shaped plan. The east front has five bays and contains windows, some of which have retained their mullions, and others are blocked. It also has an entrance with a chamfered surround. On the south front are ventilation slits, and at the east end is a first floor entrance.
Wordsworth House; 54.63456°N 2.77614°W	—	1699	A stuccoed house on a chamfered plinth with quoins, a string course, an eaves cornice, and a green slate roof. There are two storeys, four bays, and a two-bay extension to the right. The doorway has a bolection moulded architrave and an initialled and dated lintel. The windows are cross-mullioned in stone architraves. In the extension is a doorway and a sash window in stone surrounds and an overall porch.
Willow Cottage and Thwaite Cottage; 54.63254°N 2.77131°W	—	Late 17th or early 18th century	A pair of cottages that were altered in the early 19th century by adding Gothic features. They are in mixed sandstone and cobble with quoins and a green slate roof. The cottages have a single storey, and two bays each. The doorways have flattened segmental arches and latticed porches, and the windows have two lights with mullions and pointed heads in stone surrounds.
Yew Tree House; 54.63280°N 2.77160°W	—	1712	A roughcast house with quoins and a green slate roof. There are two storeys and two bays, and a single-bay extension to the right. The doorway has a stone architrave with initials and the date carved above it. The windows are sashes in stone surrounds, and to the right is a doorway with a chamfered surround.
Queens Head Hotel; 54.63280°N 2.77201°W		1719	The public house probably originated as three houses, each with two storeys, the left being the oldest with four bays, and the others with two bays each, the right house also having a rear extension. The whole building is stuccoed, partly on large plinth stones, and it has green slate roofs. In the centre of the middle and right parts is a porch, and the windows are sashes in stone surrounds.
10 Sockbridge; 54.63440°N 2.77529°W	—	Early 18th century (probable)	A roughcast stone house with a slate roof, it has two storeys, three bays, a gabled rear wing, and an outshut to the east. The windows are mullioned in chamfered surrounds, and there is a fire window.
Outbuilding, Hall Croft; 54.63493°N 2.77235°W	—	Early 18th century (probable)	The building is in stone with quoins, a slate roof, and two storeys. On the front is a large opening with a cambered timber lintel, ventilation slits, a doorway and a small square windows, and in the upper floor is a three-light mullioned window. On the south front is a window with a chamfered surround, on the north front are steps leading to a first floor entrance, and at the rear is an outshut and a window. (Note: Street View in March 2010 shows that the building has been converted for domestic use, and the large entrance has been made into a window.)
Hall Croft; 54.63503°N 2.77287°W	—	Early 18th century (probable)	A roughcast stone house with quoins and a slate roof. There are two storeys, two bays, and a rear gabled wing. The doorway has a chamfered surround and a battlemented lintel, and the windows are sashes.
South Celleron Farmhouse and barn 54.61881°N 2.78060°W	—	Early 18th century	The farmhouse and barn are in stone with slate roofs. The house is roughcast, and the roof has coped gables. There are two storeys, three bays and an outshut. The windows are small-paned with mullions and are in architraves. The doorway has an architrave, a pulvinated frieze, a cornice, and a fanlight. The barn is at right angles and has openings including an elliptical-headed barn entrance and ventilation slits. It also has an outshut and a gabled wing.
Quaker Cottage; 54.63264°N 2.77447°W	—	1731	This was originally a Quaker meeting house, the porch was added in 1733, the building was lengthened in 1801, and it later became a private house. It is roughcast with a green slate roof, and has a single storey, three bays, and a gabled stone porch. There is one casement window, the others are sashes, and all have stone surrounds.
Old Forge House; 54.63457°N 2.77542°W	—	1741	The house was later extended. It is roughcast with a slate roof, and has two storeys and three bays, the left bay being a later addition. The windows in the left bay are casements, and in the other bays they are mullioned with chamfered surrounds. Above the doorway is an initialled and dated lintel.
Lime Grove and barn 54.63261°N 2.77003°W	—	1765	The farmhouse has an extension and an adjoining barn, all with green slate roofs. The original house is stuccoed with quoins, an eaves cornice, two storeys and three bays. It has a central doorway with a stone surround and an inscribed and dated panel above, it is flanked by mullioned windows, the other windows on the front are sashes, and at the rear is a round-headed stair window. The extension to the left and the barn at right angles to the right have lower parts in calciferous sandstone and upper parts in brick. The windows in the extension are casements. The barn has a large flat-headed cart entrance and a doorway with a dated surround.
The Green; 54.63291°N 2.77057°W	—	Late 18th or early 19th century	A roughcast stone house with a slate roof, two storeys and three bays. On the front is a timber gabled porch, and the windows are sashes in stone surrounds.
The Old Post Office; 54.63300°N 2.77033°W		Late 18th or early 19th century	A roughcast house with a slate roof, two storeys and three bays. There is one casement window, the other windows being sashes. At the rear is a canted stair wing with a catslide roof.
Barn, Thwaite Cottage; 54.63252°N 2.77164°W	—	Late 18th to early 19th century (probable)	The barn is in stone and has a slate roof. In the northeast front is an elliptical-headed entrance and ventilation slits, and on the southwest front is a continuous outshut and a lean-to shed.
Barn, Hall Croft; 54.63505°N 2.77254°W	—	1813	The barn is in stone with quoins and a slate roof. In the front is an elliptical barn entrance with a dated keystone, and to the right are two doorways. The east side has ventilation slits, and at the south is an entrance with a triangular head. (Note: Street View in March 2010 shows that the barn has been converted for residential use.)
Cross Bank and Greystones; 54.63261°N 2.77089°W	—	Early to mid 19th century	Two stone houses with quoins, a slate roof, and slate hanging on the west gable. There are two storeys and three bays, and a recessed gabled wing at the east. The central doorway has a plain surround, a fanlight, and a pediment on consoles. The windows are sashes. On the east front is a doorway with a fanlight and a cornice.
Wall, railings and gate, Cross Bank and Greystones; 54.63270°N 2.77090°W	—	Early to mid 19th century	In front of the garden is a low stone coped wall ramped at one end. On it are fluted cast iron railings with decorative finials, and in the centre is a similar gate.
Boundary post 54.62519°N 2.78035°W	—	1847	The post marks the boundary between two townships. It is in cast iron with a triangular plan, and has a chamfered front, a cornice, and a plain cap containing the date. On the sides are plates inscribed with the names of the townships.

== Notes ==
=== Sources ===
- Historic England, "Sockbridge Hall, Sockbridge and Tirril (1350008)", National Heritage List for England
- Historic England, "Former gatehouse attached to south-east angle of Sockbridge Hall, Sockbridge and Tirril (1318839)", National Heritage List for England
- Historic England, "Base of cross in centre of village green, Sockbridge and Tirril (1081536)", National Heritage List for England
- Historic England, "Stone House (circa 15 yards to south-east of Wordsworth House), Sockbridge and Tirril (1318841)", National Heritage List for England
- Historic England, "Stone House Barn (circa 25 yards to south-east of Wordsworth House), Sockbridge and Tirril (1081496)", National Heritage List for England
- Historic England, "Grove Farmhouse, Sockbridge and Tirril (1081502)", National Heritage List for England
- Historic England, "Tirril Hall, Sockbridge and Tirril (1318842)", National Heritage List for England
- Historic England, "Barn approximately 60 metres to west of Sockbridge Hall, Sockbridge and Tirril (1081520)", National Heritage List for England
- Historic England, "Outbuilding approximately 50 metres to south of Sockbridge Hall, Sockbridge and Tirril (1145988)", National Heritage List for England
- Historic England, "Wordsworth House, Sockbridge and Tirril (1081494)", National Heritage List for England
- Historic England, "Willow Cottage and Thwaite Cottage, Sockbridge and Tirril (1145986)", National Heritage List for England
- Historic England, "Yew Tree House, Sockbridge and Tirril (1186881)", National Heritage List for England
- Historic England, "Queens Head Hotel, Sockbridge and Tirril (1145984)", National Heritage List for England
- Historic England, "No. 10 Sockbridge, Sockbridge and Tirril (1081492)", National Heritage List for England
- Historic England, "Outbuilding approximately 30 metres to south-east of Hall Croft, Sockbridge and Tirril (1145989)", National Heritage List for England
- Historic England, "Hall Croft, Sockbridge and Tirril (1081524)", National Heritage List for England
- Historic England, "South Celleron Farmhouse and attached barn, Sockbridge and Tirril (1145987)", National Heritage List for England
- Historic England, "Quaker Cottage, Sockbridge and Tirril (1145985)", National Heritage List for England
- Historic England, "Old Forge House, Sockbridge and Tirril (1145990)", National Heritage List for England
- Historic England, "Lime Grove and barn adjoining, Sockbridge and Tirril (1145991)", National Heritage List for England
- Historic England, "The Green, Sockbridge and Tirril (1145983)", National Heritage List for England
- Historic England, "The Old Post Office, Sockbridge and Tirril (1186880)", National Heritage List for England
- Historic England, "Barn immediately to west of Thwaite Cottage, Sockbridge and Tirril (1081512)", National Heritage List for England
- Historic England, "Barn immediately to east of Hall Croft, Sockbridge and Tirril (1318840)", National Heritage List for England
- Historic England, "Cross Bank and Greystones, Sockbridge and Tirril (1318838)", National Heritage List for England
- Historic England, "Wall railings and gate to front garden of Cross Bank and Greystones, Sockbridge and Tirril (1081543)", National Heritage List for England
- Historic England, "Boundary post at NY 497 258, Sockbridge and Tirril (1326835)", National Heritage List for England
- Historic England, Listed Buildings
- Hyde, Matthew; Pevsner, Nikolaus (2010) [1967], Cumbria, The Buildings of England, New Haven and London: Yale University Press, ISBN 978-0-300-12663-1
