= Crackenthorpe =

Village and civil parish in Cumbria, England

Coordinates: 54.583°N 2.517°W

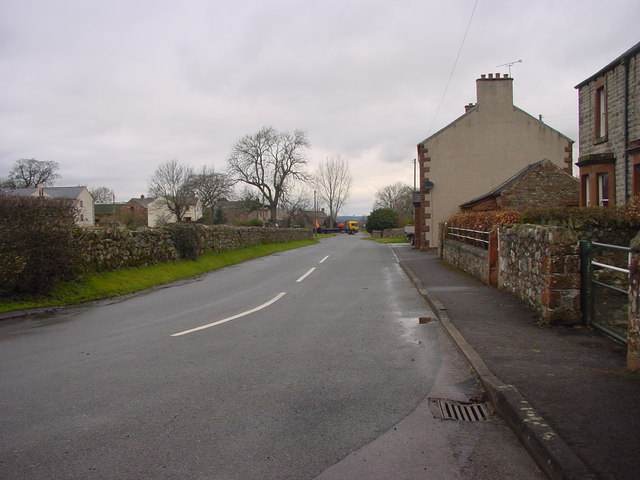
- Crackenthorpe

- Location within Cumbria
- Population: 77 (2001)
- OS grid reference: NY6622
- Civil parish: Crackenthorpe
- Unitary authority: Westmorland and Furness
- Ceremonial county: Cumbria
- Region: North West
- Country: England
- Sovereign state: United Kingdom
- Post town: APPLEBY IN WESTMORLAND
- Postcode district: CA16
- Dialling code: 01768
- Police: Cumbria
- Fire: Cumbria
- Ambulance: North West
- UK Parliament: Westmorland and Lonsdale

Crackenthorpe is a village and civil parish in Westmorland and Furness, Cumbria, England. It is about 12 miles (19 km) south east of Penrith. The village was on the A66 road until it was by-passed. The population of the civil parish was less than 100 at the 2011 Census. Details are therefore included in the parish of Long Marton.

Crackenthorpe Hall is a large grade II listed house which was rebuilt in the early 17th century and restructured in circa 1685 by Hugh & Thomas Machell. It has since been subdivided into several dwellings. It was reputedly haunted by the ghost of Peg Sneddle, the grey lady of Crackenthorpe. Her body was exhumed and buried in the bed of the River Eden under a boulder of Shap granite known as Peg's stone.

== See also ==
- Listed buildings in Crackenthorpe
