= Long Marton =

Village and civil parish in Cumbria, England

Coordinates: 54.6160°N 2.5186°W

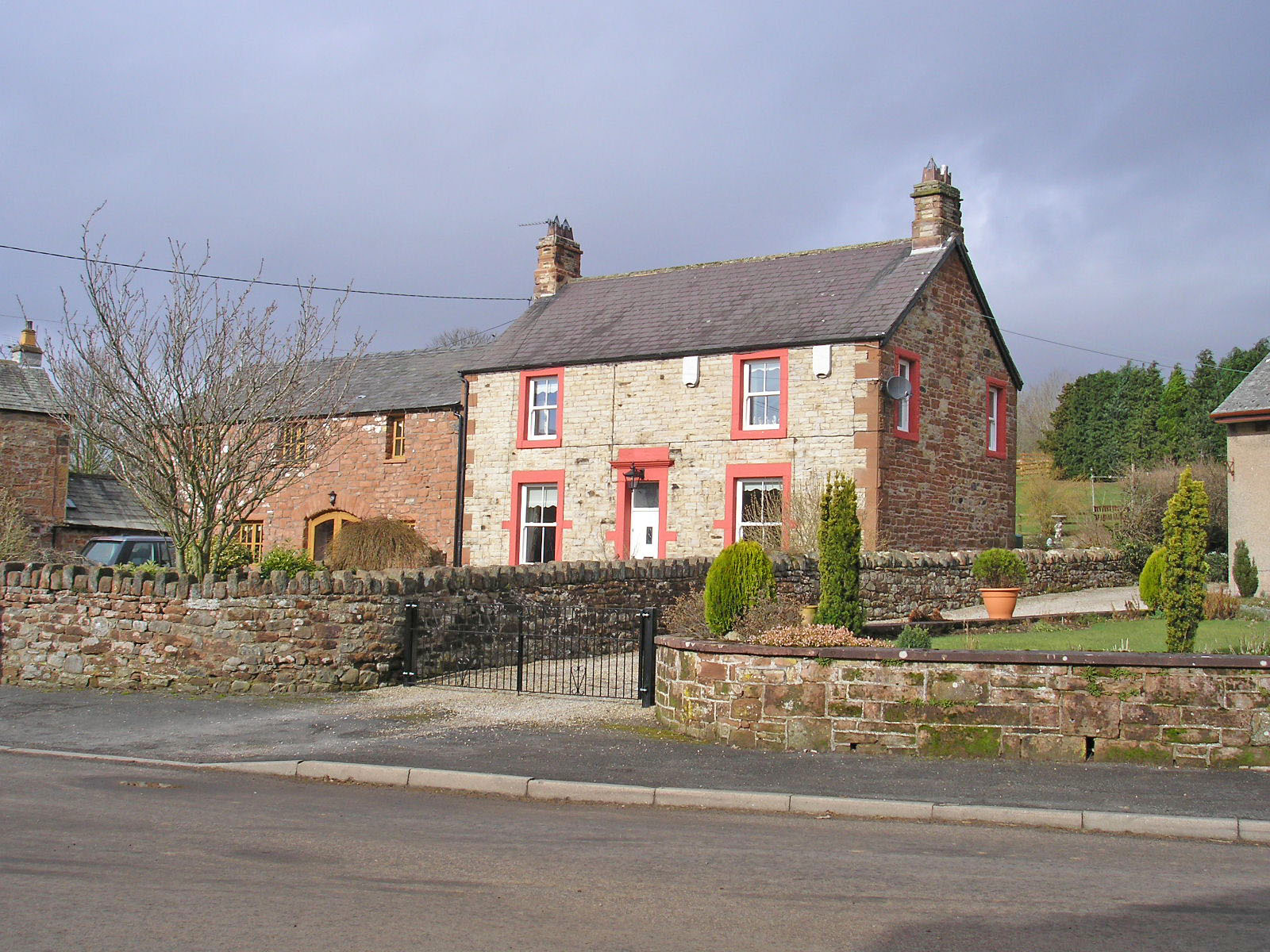
- Long Marton

- Location in Eden, Cumbria Location within Cumbria
- Population: 827 (2011. including Crackenthorpe)
- OS grid reference: NY6624
  - Belfast: 331.5 km (206.0 mi)
  - London: 561.9 km (349.1 mi)
- Civil parish: Long Marton
- Unitary authority: Westmorland and Furness
- Ceremonial county: Cumbria
- Region: North West
- Country: England
- Sovereign state: United Kingdom
- Post town: APPLEBY IN WESTMORLAND
- Postcode district: CA16
- Dialling code: 01768
- Police: Cumbria
- Fire: Cumbria
- Ambulance: North West
- UK Parliament: Westmorland and Lonsdale

Long Marton is a village and civil parish in the Westmorland and Furness unitary authority are of the ceremonial county of Cumbria, England. Until 1974 it was in the county of Westmorland. In 2011 the population of the parish (including Crackenthorpe) was 827.

The village previously had a railway station called Long Marton railway station which closed in 1970. Within the parish are also the hamlets of Marton Moor and Broom. Long Marton also has a pub. Located near the A66 3 miles from Appleby-in-Westmorland, the parish of Long Marton is bounded on the east by the parish of Dufton, on the south by the parish of St. Michael's Appleby, on the west by the parish of Kirkby Thore, and on the north by the parish of Alston Moor in the county of Cumberland:

In the 1870s, Long Marton was described as:

MARTON (LoNG), a township and a parish in East Ward district, Westmorland. The township lies on Trout beck, an affluent of the river Eden, 1½ mile ESE of Kirkby-Thore r. station, and 3½ NW by N of Appleby; and contains the village of Brampton-Croft's End. The parish includes also the townships of Brampton and Knock; and its Post town is Kirkby-Thore, under Penrith. Acres, 3,200. Real property of Long Marton and Knock townships, £3,402; of which £18 are in mines. Rated property of the entire parish, £5,182. ...

== Population ==
In 2011 the population of Long Marton was 827. Throughout history Long Marton has always had a small number of residents. In 1801 there were 432 residents in the area; this increased dramatically, and in 1831 the population rose by 432 to 819. It slowly decreased after this climax, and fell to 587 in 1911. After the First World War the population of Long Marton slowly began to increase again: in 1921 it rose to 619.

== Governance ==
Long Marton is in the parliamentary constituency of Westmorland and Lonsdale.

An electoral ward in the same name used to exist. This ward stretched east to Moor House-Upper Teesdale and had a total population taken at the 2011 census of 1,202.

== Housing types ==
In 2011 it was recorded that there were 165 detached houses within Long Marton, 126 semi-detached houses and only 66 terraced houses within the area. In 1831 there were only 171 households within Long Marton. This slowly increased and by 1961 there were 198 households within Long Marton.

A graph showing occupations in different sectors from the census data of 1881

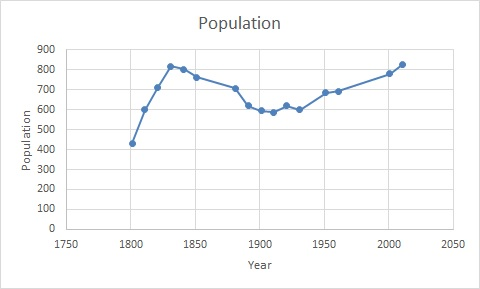
Total population of Long Marton, Civil Parish, Cumbria, by the census of population from 1750 to 2011

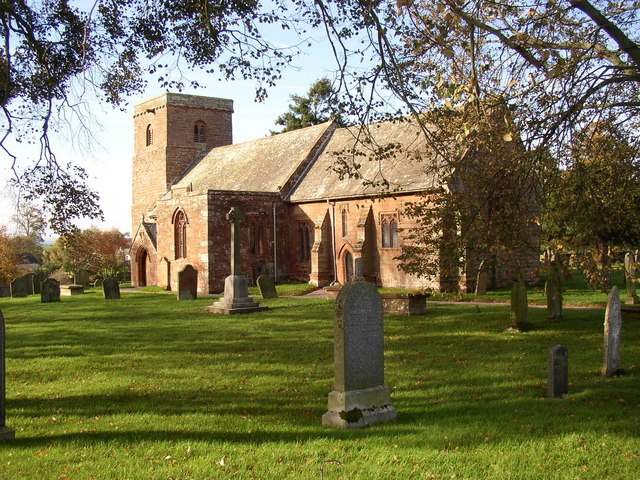
Church of St Margaret and St James, Long Marton

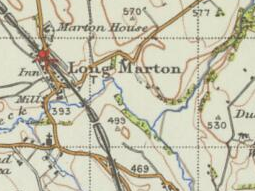
A 20th-century map of Long Marton

== Occupations ==
In 1831, Long Marton's main industry of employment was within the agricultural industry. The workforce was made up of males; the data shows the majority of males over 20 were labourers within the agricultural industry. Given the terrain of Long Marton, the vast farmland surrounding the village this industry was to be expected. However, the 1831 census gave no data on the employment of women, it is to be expected that many were not employed. In 1831 the second biggest industry was retail and handicrafts. After 50 years, in 1881 Long Marton saw a change in which industry was the biggest employer. The majority of people were employed in domestic offices or service, this was no longer just males either, females and males were employed within this industry.

The Queen's Head in Tirril was the original home of the Tirril Brewery which is now, despite its name, based beneath the Pennine fells in a Grade II listed red sandstone barn in the village of Long Marton.

== St Margaret and St James's Parish Church ==
St Margaret and St James' Church is an active Anglican parish church. It is located south of the village. Built in the Norman period on the site of an Anglo-Saxon church on the Institute Victorian two-storey hall.

== Village Hall ==
The building was built in 1839 and has been serving the community since then. The hall has had several improvements and even been made eco-friendly with solar panels. The solar panels were only made possible through a grant by Cumbria County Council. The hall hosts a variety of activities including the history group which meets every two months on a Tuesday. The group is now a member of Cumbria Local Federation.

"The organisation links the many local history societies around Cumbria with a regular newsletter & annual Conference at the University of Cumbria. Last year (2009) they agreed to support the Victoria County History of Cumbria project, & have helped set up a new Trust body, the Cumbria County History Trust (CCHT) which will raise the funds to restart & complete the massive project. The Project Leader is Dr.Angus Winchester of Lancaster University."

== Marton House ==
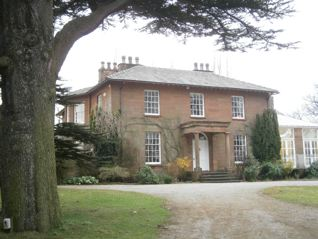
Marton House built in the 19th century

Marton House was built in the 19th century; it was designed by the English architect and surveyor Ignatius Bonomi. The house sits on six acres of beautiful gardens, including a croquet lawn. The house was originally built for the London Lead Company.

== See also ==
- Listed buildings in Long Marton
