= James Patrick Ronaldson Lyell =

James Patrick Ronaldson Lyell (1871–1948) was a solicitor, author, book collector, and bibliographer. He was educated at Merchant Taylors' School and at University College London.

== Career and writing ==
Lyell was admitted solicitor in 1894 eventually becoming senior partner of Gard, Lyell & Co.

He began to collect books in 1889 and was especially interested in Spanish book illustration. He wrote a biography of Cardinal Francisco Jimenez de Cisneros, archbishop of Toledo, and Early Book Illustration in Spain. He was interested in books of known provenance and gathering together the standard texts of the Middle Ages.

When Brian Twyne, Keeper of the Archives from 1634-1644, was commemorated in 1934, Lyell donated a copy of Twyne's Antiquitatis academiae Oxoniensis apologia, giving it to then Keeper, Strickland Gibson.

Lyell acquired medieval manuscripts and bequeathed 100 to the Bodleian Library which have been listed in the Catalogue of the Collection of Medieval Manuscripts Bequeathed to the Bodleian Library, Oxford by James P. R. Lyell.

== Lyell Readership in Bibliography ==
The Lyell Readership in Bibliography was established at Oxford in his will. After his death, Keeper of the Western Manuscripts at the Bodleian Library, Richard William Hunt, writing of the Lyell bequest noted, "he was a self-taught bibliophile and scholar of extraordinary enthusiasm and discrimination, and one who deserves to be remembered not only by Oxford but by the whole bibliographical world."

The Lyell Lectures are considered to be a major British bibliographical lecture series.

The Papers of James Patrick Ronaldson Lyell are in the Bodleian Libraries' archives and manuscripts.

== Publications ==
- Lyell, James P. R. 1917. Cardinal Ximenes, Statesman, Ecclesiastic, Soldier and Man of Letters: With an Account of the Complutensian Polyglot Bible. London: Grafton & Co.
- Lyell, James P. R. 1918. A Fifteenth Century Bibliography. London: Grafton & Co.
- Lyell, James P. R., Robertus de Fano, and Bernadinus de Bergamo. 1918. An Early Italian Press: The First Printers at Cagli. [London (England)]: [Grafton].
- Lyell, James P. R. 1923. Printing in the Fifteenth Century: An Account of Two Unrecorded Spanish Incunabula. [London]: [Grafton].
- Lyell, James P. R., and Konrad Haebler. 1926. Early Book Illustration in Spain. London: Grafton & Co.
- Lyell, James P. R., and Bodleian Library. 1933. King James I and the Bodleian Library Catalogue of 1620. Oxford: John Johnson.
- Lyell, James P. R. 1936. “A Tract on James VI’s Succession to the English Throne.” The English Historical Review LI (CCII): 289–301.
- Lyell, James P. R. 1951. “Books and Book Collecting.” The Bodleian Library Record, 278–81.
- Lyell, James P. R., and Bernard Quaritch (Firm). 1952. Manuscripts, Mostly from the Collection of the Late J.P.R. Lyell. Early Printed Books, 15th & 16th Centuries. London: B. Quaritch Ltd.
