= Christopher Potter (provost) =

English academic and clergyman

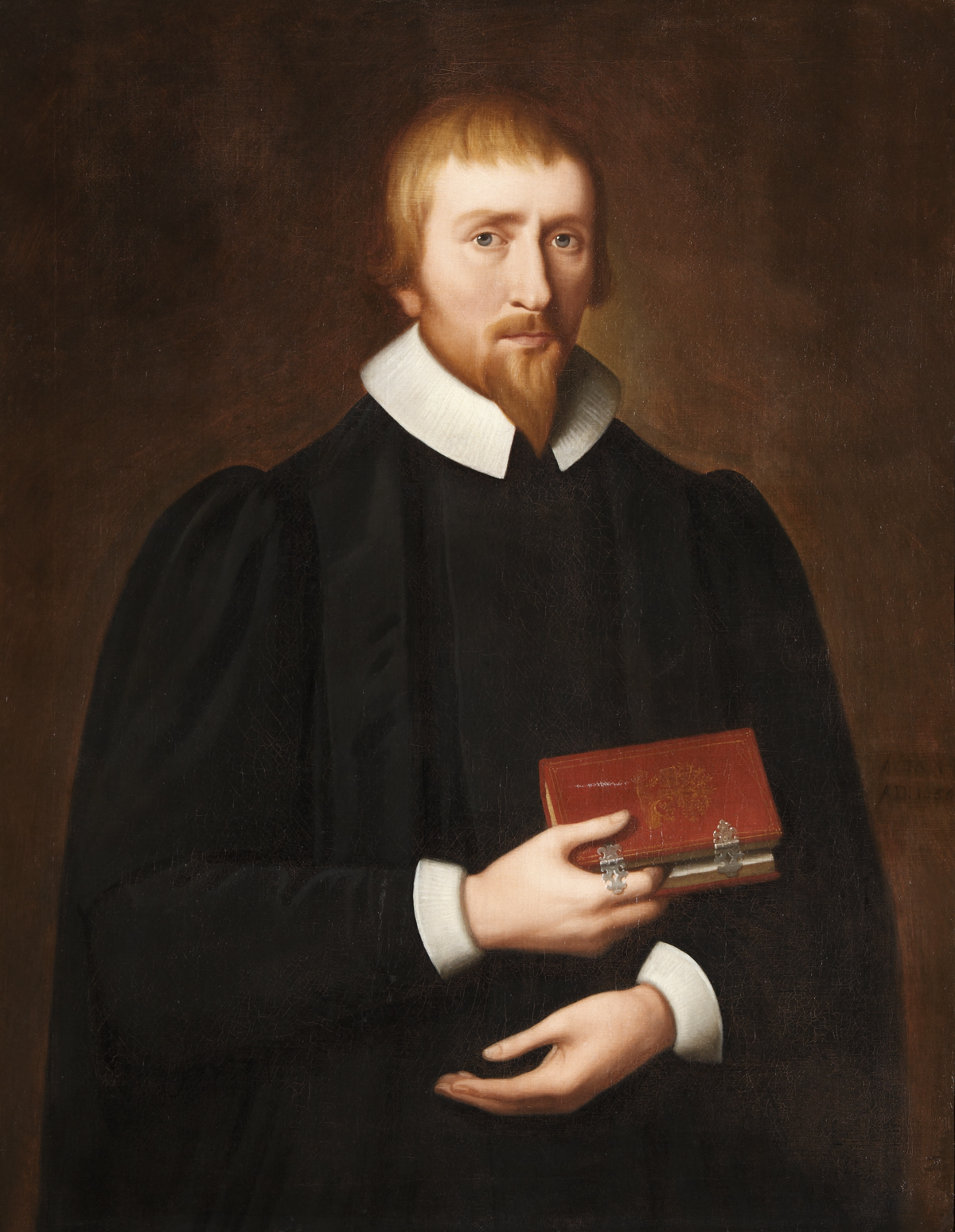
Christopher Potter circa 1636

Christopher Potter (1591 – 3 March 1646) was an English academic and clergyman, Provost of The Queen's College, Oxford, controversialist and prominent supporter of William Laud.

== Life ==
He was born in Westmoreland, the nephew of Barnaby Potter. He matriculated at Queen's on 11 July 1606, aged 15, having entered the college in the previous Easter term. He was elected taberdar (pauper puer) on 29 October 1609. He graduated B.A. on 30 April 1610 and M.A. on 8 July 1613, became chaplain on 5 July 1613, and fellow on 22 March 1614–15. He was magister puerorum in 1620, and senior bursar in 1622; graduated B.D. and received a preacher's licence on 9 March 1621, and proceeded D.D. on 17 February 1627.

He was in early life a follower of Henry Airay, opponent of Laud, and held a lectureship at Abingdon where he was a popular preacher. On his uncle's resignation of the headship of Queen's (17 June 1626), he was elected Provost. He now attached himself to Laud, and was made chaplain in ordinary to Charles I. In the first year of his provostship, with the assistance of Sir Thomas Coventry, Viscount Doncaster, and Sir George Goring, vice-chamberlain to Queen Henrietta Maria, he obtained the advowson of three rectories and three vicarages in Hampshire for the college. He himself received the rectory of Strathfieldsaye in 1627, and after the death of William Cox in 1632 was made precentor of Chichester. He received the rectory of Bletchington, Oxfordshire, in 1631.

During Laud's chancellorship of the university, Potter was a frequent correspondent. He was a disciplinarian in his college, and instituted expositions of the creed on Sundays in chapel and English sermons on Thursdays. In 1631, on the death of John Rawlinson, principal of St. Edmund Hall, he successfully asserted the rights of his college against the claim of the chancellor to nominate a principal, and Laud admitted and confirmed the right.

He had now attracted notice as a prominent Arminian, and was attacked in a violent sermon written under the influence probably of John Prideaux. He also engaged in controversy the Jesuit Edward Knott over his work Charity Mistaken, by the king's command, in a pamphlet. Potter took much the same line as Laud had taken in his reply to John Fisher. A second edition (London, 1634) was revised by Laud, whose suggested alterations later formed one of the charges brought against him at his trial. To Knott's reply, Mercy and Truth, William Chillingworth's Religion of Protestants was an answer, and Potter was asked by Laud to revise the latter work.

He became pro-vice-chancellor on 13 July 1639, and was appointed vice-chancellor on 28 July 1640. It was to him that Laud's letter of resignation of his office was addressed. On 4 December 1640 he found it necessary, with the other university officials, to issue a notice denying that they knew or suspected "any member of the university to be a papist, or popishly inclined".

He had been promoted, by Laud's influence, as Dean of Worcester in 1636, and he received the rectory of Great Haseley, Oxfordshire, 1642. On the outbreak of the First English Civil War he contributed £400 to the king in July 1642, in addition to £800 given by the college. He left Oxford, but returned before Christmas 1642; he preached at the Treaty of Uxbridge. In January 1646 the king nominated him to the deanery of Durham, but he died, before his installation, on 3 March.

== Personal life ==
Potter married Elizabeth, daughter of Dr. Charles Sonnibanke, canon of Windsor. They had a son Charles Potter (1634–1663), courtier, born in the college in 1634. Charles became a Roman Catholic, and at the Restoration was made an usher to Queen Henrietta Maria. In May 1662 he was repaid £2,000 which his father had lent to Charles I. Elizabeth afterwards married Gerard Langbaine, the next Provost of Queen's.

== Additional sources ==
- This article incorporates text from a publication now in the public domain: "Potter, Christopher (1591-1646)". Dictionary of National Biography. London: Smith, Elder & Co. 1885–1900.

Academic offices
Preceded by Barnaby Potter	Provost of The Queen's College, Oxford; 1626–1646	Succeeded by Gerard Langbaine
