= Attack on Lambeth Palace, 1640 =

English uprising

In May 1640 an armed mob gathered at Lambeth Palace and attacked it. Claiming to want to speak with the highly unpopular Archbishop of Canterbury, William Laud, the crowd blamed Laud for the prorogation of the recent parliament. He was also distrusted for seemingly advocating High Church Anglicanism, possibly being a crypto-Papist, and for his support of Charles I's unpopular Queen, the Catholic Henrietta Maria. In the weeks proceeding the assault, several libels were published against Laud, often threatening him with violence and predicting an attack on the palace. On the night of 11/12 May, a mob descended upon Lambeth Palace, beating drums and armed. However, the archbishop was absent, having retired to Whitehall Palace for safety. His house was well guarded, and several rioters were shot at. In the aftermath of the attack, two men were tried for treason and executed for their roles. Laud himself was subsequently beheaded five years later after being impeached. To many Londoners, this was seen as justice for the reprisals against the Southwark mob, and his predicament was celebrated in verse.

== Background ==
=== King, Laud and popular dissent ===
By 1640, English government was in crisis, brought about by religious and political dissension. In 1625 the king, Charles I had married the Catholic Henrietta Maria of France, who had sworn to Pope Urban VIII that she would actively aid the restoration of Catholicism in England. Charles aroused most antagonism through his religious measures. He believed in High Anglicanism, a sacramental version of the Church of England, theologically based upon Arminianism, a creed shared with his main political adviser, the Archbishop of Canterbury, William Laud. He was equally unpopular on account of both his theology—he was seen as very high church (Note: Although not Catholic, his theology was based on "the beauty of holiness", involving the return of pomp and display to church services: "for the Puritan, these ceremonies were the dregs of popery".)—and his closeness to Charles. High church Anglicanism was seen as effectively crypto-Catholicism by the suspicious—indeed, he had been called "the Pope of Lambeth" around Southwark inns—and hence threatened a return to popery. By 1640, Laud "had good reason to know that there were people out there who hated him", comments the historian Peter Lake.

Discontent with the King's advisors (Note: Rarely, at this stage, was the King held personally responsible; the old medieval concept that the king—as God's anointed—was innocent of everything except taking bad advice was still generally accepted.) was common. In 1628 a London crowd—termed a mob by the Victorian historian S. R. Gardiner—had murdered the Duke of Buckingham's physician, John Lambe. and in 1634, riots broke out on the pillorying of William Prynne, a religious radical. The same mob regularly slandered the Queen, both for her Catholicism and alleged profligacy: for example, it was asserted that Charles gave her £1,000 a week, which "the poore Subbiects p[ai]d". At the forefront of the dissent were the London apprentices. In the words of the antiquarian Charles Knight, these "were not a low-bred or illiterate class. The greater number were the sons of substantial citizens or yeomen," and because they were often the sons of gentlemen they were entitled to wear weapons. Marches of apprentices were possibly spontaneous, but may have been surreptitiously organised by men such as John Pym, a leading parliamentarian and radical.

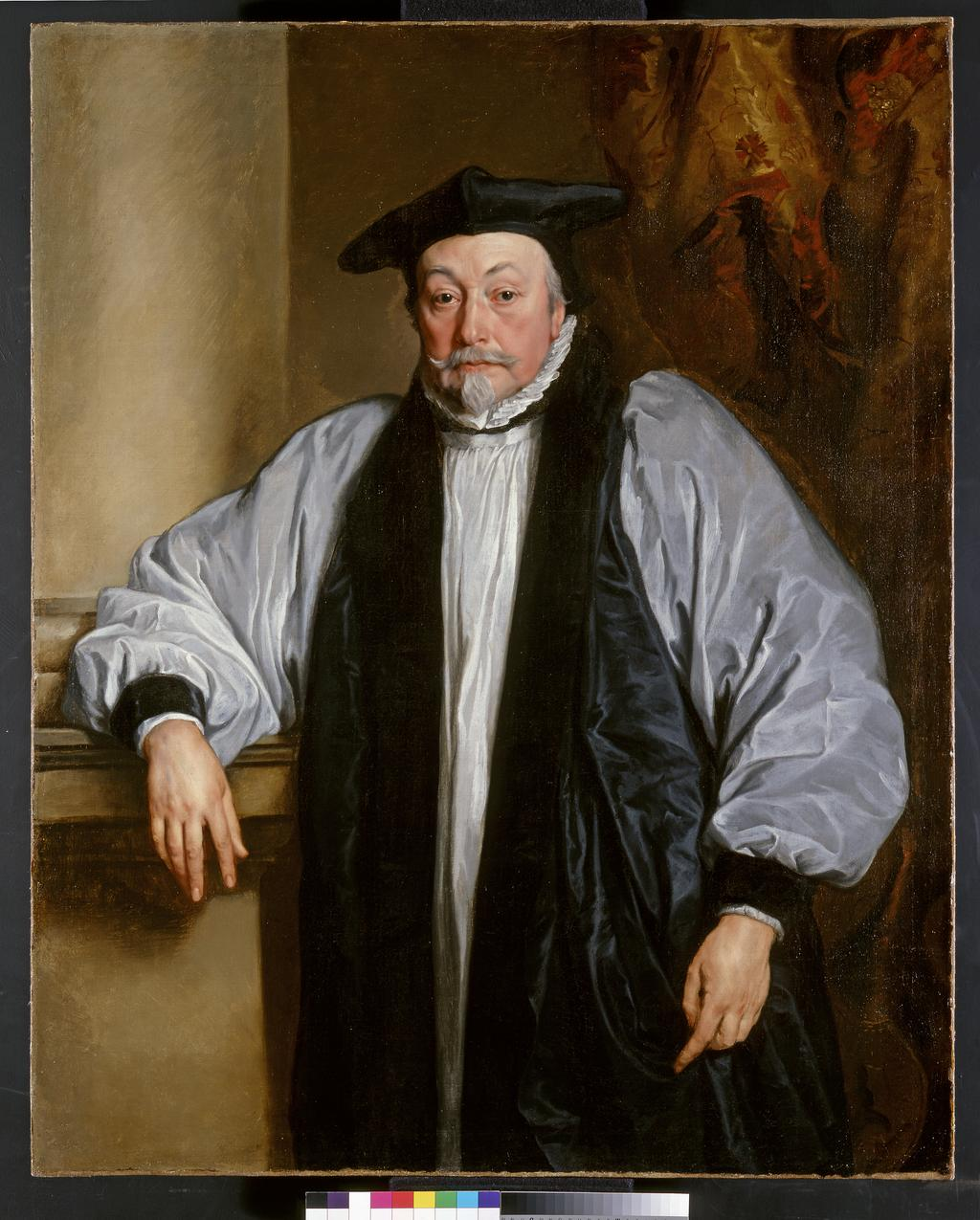
1638 portrait of William Laud by Anthony van Dyck, now held in the Fitzwilliam Museum

Dissent was not only expressed through physical force, but also through propaganda in the form of political, often polemical, and nearly always anonymous poems. These were known as libels, and generally sharply campaigned against the authors' opponents in an attempt to raise support for certain positions. Laud was a frequent target. In 1637 he had been accused of ordering the mutilations of Prynne and his cohorts. (Note: Following their pillorying, Laud had ordered the three men's ears cut off, which earned him the opprobrium of the Londoners. An observer described how "at the cutting of each ear there was such a roaring as if every one of [the crowd] had at the same instant lost an ear" and that their treatment was "too sharp, too base and ignominious for gentlemen of their ingenuous vocation".) Laud later complained that certain libels had been published that called him "William the Fox".

=== Short parliament ===
Charles finally brought his Personal rule to an end in February 1640. Short on funds with which to prosecute his ongoing war with Scotland, he was forced to recall parliament and ask for a subsidy. This parliament, though, was intent on redressing its grievances rather than in voting the King funds. As a result of this and the large number of public petitions against royal abuses, Charles dissolved the parliament three weeks later, on 5 May. In London, Laud was held personally responsible for both the war with Scotland—a fellow Protestant nation—and the prorogation of parliament.

=== Libels against Laud ===
The day after the Short Parliament rose, a number of libels had been promulgated around the city calling for the hunting of "William the Fox", and called for "every class to preserve their ancient liberty and chase the bishops from the kingdom". Similar calls were made to "destroy this subtle fox and hunt this ravening wolf out of his den". (Note: Foxes were seen as a particular curse on society, and people could be rewarded for their killing. As Keith Thomas has argued, they were "outside the terms of moral reference" for civilized society; the Jacobean preacher John Rawlinson said that foxes were "not helpful, but hurtful ... and therefore no pity [is] to be had of them".) These bills were directed at "Gentlemen Prentisses" and summoned them to St George's Fields, Southwark. Several interrogations from the time reveal the depth of feeling against Laud. In one, a servant states that he had heard that "his Grace’s house of Canterbury at Lambeth should be fired, and yt they woulde keepe his Lo[rdshi]p in until he shuld be burnt", while another man was alleged to have said "my lord of Canterbury a pox on hym for he was the cause of the dissolution of the parliament, but they [the attackers] will have him ere they leave". Graffiti referencing Laud was found on the walls of the Royal Exchange against the "bishop's devils", which called upon "all Gentleman Prentises yt desire to kill the B[isho]p". Other libels compared Laud's fate to that of John Lambe, Buckingham's physician, who in 1628 had also been murdered by a mob led by apprentices. Laud was condemned as an enemy of the common weal. The authorities, thus alerted, mustered the Southwark-based militia on 11 May, but with little sign of trouble, they were stood down the same evening.

== 11/12 May 1640 ==
The dissolution of parliament has increased the irritation of the people here to such an extent that, throwing off all restraint, they have not hesitated to break into open revolt against the present government. Last Saturday several placards appeared in the most conspicuous parts of the city urging every class to preserve their ancient liberty and chase the bishops from the kingdom, as pernicious men; inviting them to meet on the Monday in fields near by to secure in union the death of many leading ministers, reputed enemies of the commonweal. They threaten by name the Archbishop of Canterbury, the Marquis Hamilton and the Lieutenant of Ireland, being the persons who have most influence with his Majesty. Accordingly on that day two thousand men assembled at the appointed place supplied with weapons and with drums beating proceeded in a riotous manner to the archbishop's house with the purpose of slaying him. Being warned of his peril a few hours before, he fled secretly to the palace leaving armed men to defend his house from the insolence of the rioters.

Following the dispersal of the militia, crowds gathered in St George's Fields. Around midnight, headed by apprentices and to the accompaniment of drums, this made its way to Lambeth Palace. There the crown was augmented by arrivals from the nearby suburbs of Blackwall, Ratcliff and Wapping, in all—at Laud's later estimation—totalling 500 persons. Other estimates were greater: Thomas Coke, writing to his father put the number at 800 "or therabouts", while John Castle and the Venetian ambassador estimated 1200 and 2000 respectively.

Few details are now known of the attack on the palace. It appears the crowd originally gathered outside the palace gates, and claimed to want only to ask Laud "but one civil question": whether it was, indeed, he who was responsible for the dissolution of parliament. Threats—"reviling of all bitterness"—continued to be made against Laud. Some, following the instructions of the Royal Exchange libels, brought guns and fired at the defenders. According to a witness, the crowd damaged the gardens and orchard, and would have torn the building down. In response, Laud's guards fired on the crowd. (Note: Although Walter questions questions whether this was with shot, as one of those reported fired on was merely scorched with brown paper and gunpowder.)

The archbishop, however, was not there. Fearing the worst, he had left two hours earlier and made his way by boat to Westminster Palace, taking his plate. A contemporary described the events of the night of 11 May and Laud's escape:

This eveninge a drum was beat up in Southwarke & Charge given to the trayne bond there to guard the Archb[isho]ps house. About 12 or one of Clock in the night diverse hundreds were gathered together to assault the Archb[isho]ps house, & the archb[isho]p was compelled to take a grey cloake as was s[ai]d & to escape over Thames. oh Lord god bringe good out of all these troubles & feares for the Lords sake.

Before Laud departed, he attempted to fortify the palace. His guards were armed; Laud had spent £50 on watchmen, musketeers, gunners, ordnance, gunpowder and shot. His guards were assisted on the ground by several justices and a small number of constables who were insufficient in number to push the crowd back. Around 2 AM, realising that Laud was indeed absent, the crowd began dispersing, although not without threats to return and a promise to see him "either by hook or by crook, sooner or later".

On 12 May the Privy Council—of which Laud was a member—promulgated orders against riotous assemblies in London and authorised the mayor to keep the militia on standby. People south of the river were prevented from travelling to the city and boats were kept ready to transport troops to the area at short notice. Vagrancy was made punishable by arrest, the city watch was doubled, and a militia force took up residency in St George's Fields. Laud's signature was at the top of the council order.

=== 14 May ===
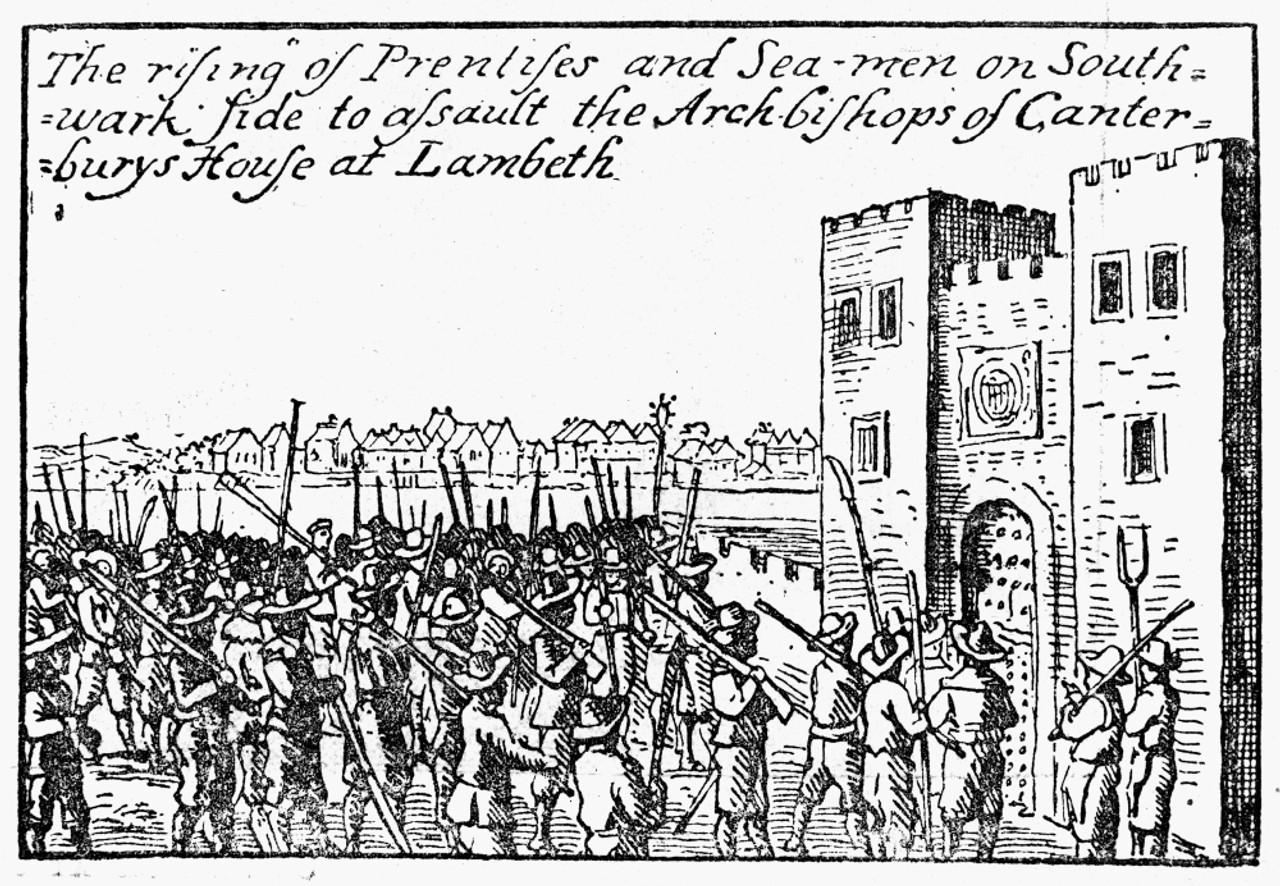
Laud's palace attacked; the text reads "The rising of Prentises and Sea-men on Southwark side to assault the Archbishops of Canterburys house at Lambeth.

In spite of the Privy Council's measures, the crowds returned and the libels continued to be distributed threatening the "destruction" of Laud. A Northamptonshire lawyer, Robert Woodford wrote that "we hear of diverse other libels, and the state of things in the Kingdome is very doubtfull and uncertaine'. As Laud had escaped to Whitehall Palace, placards soon appeared, fix to the gates, stating that in spite of his royal protection, he would not escape popular justice. (Note: Threats were also made against the Papal Nuncio, Carlo Rossetti, a friend and agent of the Queen, whose house had been threatened with being burned down and had moved into St James Palace for his safety.)

Rumours abounded. It was said that on 14 May another crowd—substantially bigger than that of three nights earlier, estimated at between 5,000 and 8,000 people—assembled at Blackheath, while the Venetian Ambassador reported that a mob of 7,000 had destroyed the palace as they had threatened. Both rumours were false. However, a large crowd of around "several thousand" had instead marched on the city and searched for their imprisoned comrades in the jails: from The Clink, to White Lion Prison and that of the King's Bench Prison, among others, they released several individuals being held for their part in the events of the 11th, and threatened to pull at least one of the buildings down. further libels appeared, now also naming the Earl of Strafford, the Marquis of Hamilton and the Spanish Ambassadors. Walter argues that this escalation of popular threats to anti-Spanish and anti-Catholic targets illustrates the degree to which the Short Parliament's dissolution was seem as a papist plot. (Note: notes that "rioters in London during May 1640 included among their targets the Catholic Queen, her priests, the Papal Agent and sundry recusant gentry and peers", although also argues that this only lasted from 1640 to 1642, as "once the war had exposed their weakness recusants became unimportant".)

=== Laud's diary, contemporary and subsequent opinion ===
Londoners referred to the attack as "the Blunder and Hubbub’ of Lambeth. In 1682, the Tory pamphleteer and clergyman, John Nalson, in what Walter calls his "anything but" Impartial Collection argues that "the Rabble" intended to make the archbishop "the Sacrifice of their Rage could they have got him into their Power", while erl of Clarendon believed they openly stated their intention to dismember Laud. The bills proclaiming him an enemy of the commonweal implicitly accused Laud of treason in doing so, and since the Middle Ages it had been accepted in common law that the people had the right to execute the king's justice upon his enemies when they were discovered (for example, against outlaws and abjurors).

Laud's diary entries for the period read as follows:

Maii 5. Tuesday, The Parliament ended and nothing done. The Convocation continued.

May 9 and 11. Saturday, a paper posted upon the Old Exchange, animating prentices to sack my house upon the Monday following, early.

May 11. Monday night, At midnight my house at Lambeth was beset with 500 Of these rascal routers. I had notice, and strengthened the house as well as I could; and God be thanked, I had no harm; they continued there full two hours. Since I have fortified my house as well as I can; and hope all may be safe. But yet libels are continually set up in all places of note in the city.

Maii 11. My deliverance was great; God make me thankful for it.

Maii 21. Thursday, one of the chief being taken, was condemned at Southwark, and hanged and quartered on Saturday morning following (May 23).

Maii 15. But before this, some of these mutinous people came in the daytime, and brake the White Lion Prison, and let loose their fellows, both out of that prison and the King's Bench, and the Other prisoners also out of the White Lion.

== Aftermath ==
The crown, in an attempt to preempt further outbreaks, issued more proclamations for punishing those who took part in "traiterous and rebellious assemblies". This was promulgated on 15 may around Southwark, Westminster, the city and its suburbs; anyone in breach of the order was liable to be arrested or killed. London Bridge's drawbridge and portcullis was ordered repaired, (Note: STUFF ABOUT IT HAVING BEEN DECREPIT SINCE 1470s) the armed militia was placed outside the royal palaces—including at Richmond, where the Royal children were—and in the city a curfew was imposed and the Tower's guard was strengthened. (Note: However, there appears to have been a degree of uncertainty as to the loyalty of the militia. At least one apprentices is known to have sworn to join the mob if he were forced to join the militia, and it was known that the fear of popery could infect both master and servant. Perhaps confirming the crown's fears, it remained to "courtiers and gentlemen pensioners" to protect the Queen Mother at Gidea Hall and Laud, when he returned to Lambeth.)

== Accused ==
A drummer, Benstead was accused of encouraging the mob with his drum. Convicted and hanged, drawn and quartered, his head was set above London Bridge and his quartered body parts distributed between various gates of London. His precise age is unknown, but he is believed by historians to have been in his teens at the time of his death. (Note: Although not a teenager, a concept which did not exist in the 17th-century as it is understood in the 21st. Youth was seen as a preparation for adulthood rather than a distinct phase of one's life, although infancy was certainly distinguished from adulthood.)

=== Executions ===
Benstead has been described by Walter as the crown's "sacrificial victim... of repression", and he and his comrade's trials as "judicial revenge".

== Aftermath ==
In March 1461, Laud was committed to The Tower on treason charges. Londoners, says Walter, "angrily celebrated on the streets"; Laud himself complained how the mob "followed me with clamour and revilings even beyond barbarity itself". He was sworn at, bombarded with mud and leeks (Note: It being St David's Day, he was mockingly told to "make him[self] pottage this Lent.) This, argues Walter, was their moment of revenge for Benstead and .

== Commemoration ==
Benstead's death was later eulogised by an anonymous pamphleteer in the Mercuries Message Defended of 1641, as a satirical example of Laud's charity:

That he was indeed, to cut off mens ears, and damne them to perpetuall imprisonment for speaking two or three angry words against his lawne sleeves and rochet, but how strangely was the body of his charity divided, when he hung it up in quarters upon four severall gates, and stucke the head [of Benstead] on London-bridge?

As Laud awaited his own execution in 1645 another popular poem recalled the treatment of Benstead, and blamed Laud for it:

When ye yonge ladds did to you come
you knew their meaning by their drum
you had better y[i]elded then:
yor head[,] yor Body then might have
one death on[e] burial & on[e] grave
by Boys but [now] two by men.
But you yt by y[ou]r Jud[ge]m[en]t cleare
will make five quarters in a year
and hang them on ye gate:
That head [i.e. Benstead’s] shall stand upon ye bridge
when yours shall under Traytors bridge
& smile at yor Just fate.

== Historiography ==
The attack on Lambeth Palace has often been seen, since Gardiner proposed it in the 19th century, as exemplifying the political crises that Charles's Personal rule had led to. More recently, Keith Lindley, in a study of the period's popular politics and its relationship with religion identified several previously anonymous participants of the May 1640 attack as part of a broader prosopography of mass politics. In 2006, David Cressy contexualized the attack nationally, seeing it as part of a more general trend of nationwide disorder. Walter's 2024 article re-evaluates the palace assault, and emphasises its political—rather than economic or religious—causation following Walter's discovery of most of Benstead's interrogation. (Note: Walter notes that, "Benstead’s deposition, unfortunately missing its opening page, was part of the uncatalogued papers of Lord Chief Justice Sir John Bramston", held at Essex Record Office. The document is classified as ERO D/Deb 94/20.)
