= Benjamin Buckler =

Benjamin Buckler (1716 or 1717 – 24 December 1780) was an antiquarian and an academic at the University of Oxford.

== Life ==
Buckler, from Warminster in Wiltshire, studied at Oriel College, Oxford, from 1733 onwards. He obtained his Bachelor of Arts degree in 1736 and his Master of Arts degree in 1739; he was also elected that year to a fellowship of All Souls College. After ordination, he was vicar of Cumnor in Berkshire (now Oxfordshire) and rector of Frilsham, also in Berkshire. He was a good friend of the lawyer William Blackstone (later the first Vinerian Professor of English Law), who was also a fellow of the college, and followed Blackstone as bursar of All Souls. They were seen as leaders of the Tory group at Oxford, who enabled Roger Newdigate's selection as Member of Parliament for the university constituency from 1750. Tories also helped to elect John Fane, 7th Earl of Westmorland, as the university's Chancellor in 1759. Buckler himself was elected Keeper of the Archives of the university in 1777.

His writings include a history of Cumnor, included in the 8-volume Bibliotheca Topographica Britannica (1780–90) by John Nichols. He also defended one of the college's traditions. It was said a mallard had been discovered when the foundations were laid in 1438, and this was commemorated in the singing of the Mallard Song from the 17th century onwards every 14 January, the feast day of Hilary of Poitiers. (The song is now sung every 100 years.) In 1749, the author of Oxoniensis academia, John Pointer, alleged that the bird in question was only a goose; Buckler replied in 1750 with A Complete Vindication of the Mallard of All Souls College, although he did so anonymously.

He supported the Tory cause in articles and in his only published sermon. In 1765, he published a genealogical table of the families entitled to claim fellowships of All Souls by virtue of a relationship to the founder, Archbishop Henry Chichele; he and Blackstone were opposed to those graduates with only family ties behind them. He died on 24 December 1780 at Cumnor, where he was buried.
