= Faye McLeod =

British archivist

Faye McLeod is the first female Keeper of the Archives at the University of Oxford in the United Kingdom.

McLeod studied at Brasenose College, Oxford during 1999–2003, receiving a BA degree in English Language and Literature from the University of Oxford. She then studied for a Master's degree in Archive Administration at the University of Wales, Aberystwyth (2005–07) and a Post-Graduate Certificate in Relational Database Systems at the Open University in 2004.

During 2004–05, she was a cataloguing assistant at St Antony's College, Oxford. She was archivist for the Aston Martin Heritage Trust (2006–11), Head Archivist at the Jaguar Heritage Trust (2011–18) at Gaydon, and then Archivist and Records Manager for Keble College, Oxford (2018–20). In 2020, she was appointed Keeper of the University Archives, based in the Bodleian Libraries at Oxford University, succeeding Simon Bailey.
