= Brian Twyne =

English archivist (1581–1644)

- Born: c. 21 July 1581; Southwark, London, England
- Died: 4 July 1644 (aged 62); Oxford, England
- Education: Corpus Christi College, Oxford

Brian Twyne (c. 25 July 1581 – 4 July 1644) was an English antiquary and an academic at the University of Oxford. After being educated at Corpus Christi College, Oxford, and becoming a Fellow of the college in 1606, he published his one main work, a history of the university, in 1608. This was designed to prove that Oxford was older than Cambridge University, and has been described by a modern writer as a "remarkable achievement for a young scholar of twenty-eight."

His main accomplishment was to play a leading role in the revision of the university statutes under William Laud (Chancellor of the University of Oxford and Archbishop of Canterbury). He was rewarded by appointment in 1634 to the new position of Keeper of the Archives, in which role he obtained a new royal charter for Oxford to confirm its rights and privileges, and helped the university in its disputes with the city authorities.

== Education and early career ==
Brian Twyne was born on or near 25 July 1581 in Southwark, Surrey (now part of London). His father was the translator and doctor Thomas Twyne, and his grandfather was the schoolmaster and antiquarian John Twyne. He was educated at Corpus Christi College, Oxford (his father's college), probably after attending the grammar school in Lewes, Sussex, where his father then lived. He matriculated on about 6 February 1596, taking a place normally kept for a scholar from the county borough of Southampton as there was no vacancy for one from the county of Surrey (under the system at Corpus Christi for admitting students). Taking another county's vacancy was not unusual, however. He obtained his Bachelor of Arts degree on 23 July 1599. Despite the assistance of his father's patron Thomas Sackville, 1st Earl of Dorset (Lord High Treasurer and Chancellor of the University), he failed to be elected to a fellowship at Merton College, Oxford. He studied with the mathematician Thomas Allen, encountering modern developments in astronomy and navigation, and also learned French, Italian and Hebrew. He became a Fellow of Corpus Christi in 1606, and was ordained in the following year; although he later became vicar of Rye, Sussex, he stayed in Oxford and the parish duties were undertaken by curates.

== First history of the University ==
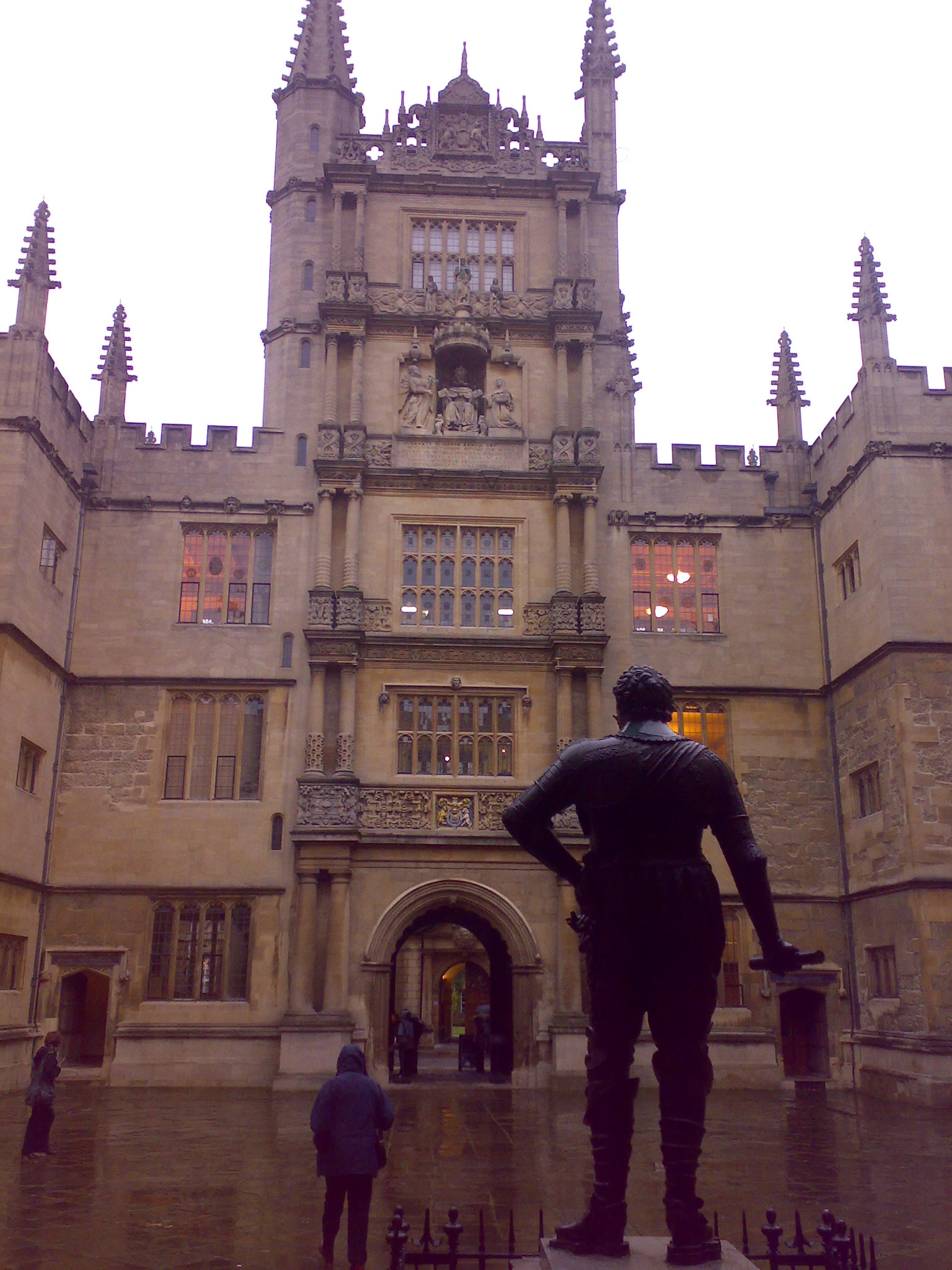
The Tower of the Five Orders at the Bodleian Library, Oxford, into which Twyne moved the university's records when appointed Keeper of the Archives

Twyne published one main work: Antiquitatis academiae Oxoniensis apologia, in 1608. This has been described by Strickland Gibson (Keeper of the Archives at Oxford 1927–1945) as being "of a controversial character, and not of a kind to establish his reputation as a sound historian." It was the first history of the University of Oxford to appear in print, and addressed a dispute between Oxford and Cambridge Universities as to which was the older. Oxford's contention was that it had originally been established at Cricklade (or "Greeklade") by Trojans and some Greek philosophers under the leadership of Brutus after the Trojan War. Cambridge claimed to have been founded by a King Cantaber of Spain in the pre-Christian era, and said that in contrast Oxford had only been founded by Alfred the Great in the 9th century. In 1603, however, the historian William Camden published a new edition of the life of Alfred by the 9th-century Welsh monk Asser. In this edition, Asser was recorded as stating that Alfred had visited Oxford in 886 to settle disputes between students – i.e., the university existed before his visit. This strengthened Oxford's claim to be older than Cambridge.

In the light of Camden's publication, Twyne began collecting material to re-establish Oxford as the senior university. He was given permission by the university to borrow documents for this purpose in May 1606. The work (running to 456 pages in three volumes) relies upon archive documents held by the university, the colleges and the city of Oxford, as well as material from three Oxfordshire abbeys and the works of Homer, Aristotle, Cicero, and other classical authors. He submitted his work for inspection by a university committee in early 1608. It was approved, with one of the four committee members praising the book's style and learning. Gibson described it as "a remarkable achievement for a young scholar of twenty-eight." Nevertheless, it appears from Twyne's records that he had considerable doubts as to the veracity of the material in Camden's edition. Twyne had been unable to find the reference to Alfred's visit to Oxford in any known manuscript of Asser's work, and challenged Camden about it. Camden said that it came from a copy sent to him by Sir Henry Savile, Warden of Merton College, Oxford. It is now generally thought that Savile was responsible for the passage that made the false claim, and that Camden knew this. One more recent history of the university says that "even in his own time Twyne's opinions on this subject [i.e. when Oxford was founded] were received with amused tolerance by the better informed of English antiquaries."

Twyne dedicated the work to Robert Sackville, 2nd Earl of Dorset: the 1st Earl had died earlier in 1608. It was published by the university printer, Joseph Barnes, who would have required guarantees for the costs: Gibson's view was that these were probably provided by Thomas Allen, with the Earl paying "the customary honorarium" as dedicatee.

== Work at Oxford ==
Twyne studied manuscripts at the Bodleian Library, founded by Thomas Bodley in 1602. Thomas Twyne, his father, gave books to the library. When Bodley died in 1613, Twyne was one of the contributors to a volume of verse commemorating him: he wrote eight poems in Latin and one in Greek, and recalled a comment by King James I that Bodley ought to be called "Sir Thomas Godley". However, Twyne was displeased with the work of Thomas James, the first Bodley's Librarian, complaining to the library authorities in November 1613 about missing manuscripts, inaccurate records and delays in accessing new acquisitions, and about the librarian's poor attendance and his habit of scattering his papers around the desks. James was admonished for his conduct.

Thomas Anyan became President of Corpus Christi in 1614, and he appointed Twyne as Greek lecturer. By 1623, Twyne had resigned his fellowship, apparently (according to the 17th-century Oxford historian Anthony Wood) to avoid having to choose which side to support in a dispute between the college president and the fellows.

He did not secure any further academic advancement: he hoped to be appointed Camden Professor of Ancient History on the death or resignation of Degory Wheare (the first professor). According to Twyne, Camden promised this to him in a conversation in 1623, and a patent sealed by Camden in March of that year to this effect was read out to the university's governing body in January 1624. Camden, however, wrote to Wheare shortly after the patent was signed and said that he had been tricked by some "foul play" and did not intend to appoint Twyne. In the end, Twyne died three years before Wheare.

In 1624, a House of Commons committee criticised Anyan for, amongst other things, excessive lenience to Twyne for his drunkenness.

== Statutes and archives ==
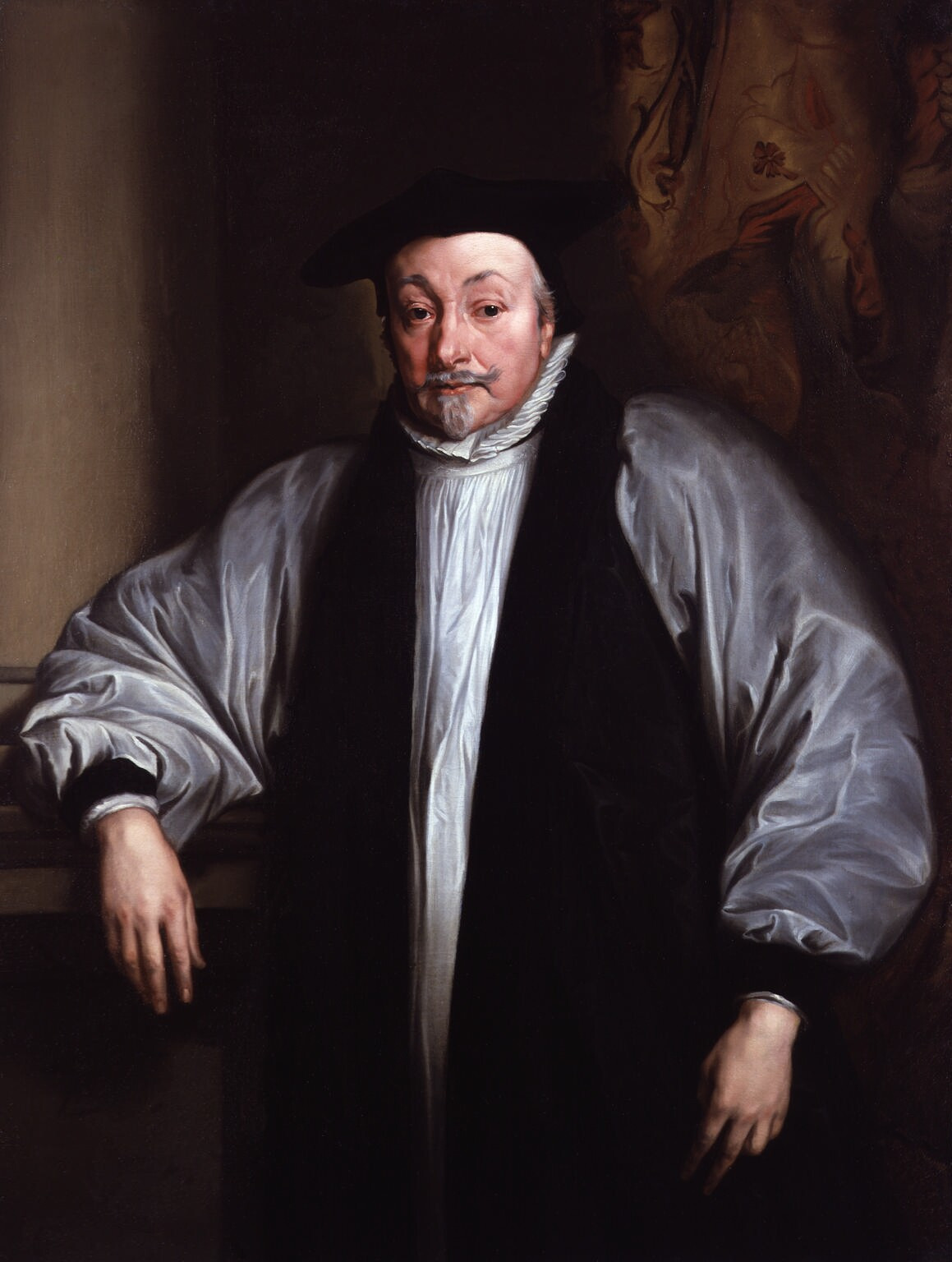
William Laud, Chancellor of the University

The university's statutes at this time were written in the registers of the chancellor and proctors. The chancellor's register dated from 1315, and the contents had been confusingly rearranged by rebinding. The two proctors' registers, which dated from 1407 and 1477, were in better arrangement, but repealed statutes remained next to ones that were current. Twyne was first appointed to a 28-strong committee for revising the statutes in 1614, although nothing came of their work. He led efforts to improve the archives of Corpus Christi in 1627 and 1628, producing 30 volumes of manuscript transcriptions of title deeds. In 1630, Twyne was part of a new delegacy appointed by the new Chancellor of the University William Laud (who was also Archbishop of Canterbury) to revise the statutes. The other members were Robert Pink (Warden of New College), Thomas James (Bodley's Librarian, later replaced on the committee by Peter Turner), and Richard Zouch (Regius Professor of Civil Law). By 1631, an inventory of the university's archives had been made. Twyne, assisted by Zouch, carried out the bulk of the work in drafting new statutes, and it was reported to the university's governing body on 1 September 1633 that work was complete. The vice-chancellor asked Turner to make a final revision, and requested that Twyne write a historical account of the previous attempts to reform the statutes as a preface. To Twyne's intense displeasure, the preface that he hurriedly wrote was shortened and rewritten extensively by Turner.

His reward, however, was to be the university's first Keeper of the Archives, appointed on 11 August 1634. The new statute governing the position noted the losses that Oxford had suffered because of the careless keeping of its archives, and the need for an experienced person to take charge of them and to advise the university's officers in defending its interests. He was to be paid not less than £40 annually, with a levy of one shilling from each graduate and undergraduate. Thereafter, he sought to obtain royal confirmation of Oxford's rights and privileges, to keep the city of Oxford subordinate to the university, and to match the position of Cambridge. A new royal charter was obtained in 1636 to confirm the revised statutes. Under Twyne and his successor as Keeper (Gerard Langbaine), the archives were moved into one of the rooms in the Tower of the Five Orders in the Bodleian Library; three of the wooden presses that were built at that time to store them are still in use.

Twyne advised the university authorities in their disputes with the city fathers in relation to courts, licensing, markets and other matters. He was "spurred on", according to one historian of the university, by "violent antipathy towards townsmen"; Twyne wrote that they were "too near engrafted into the university to be a body of themselves". As a result, his actions in rejecting even minor claims by the local inhabitants sometimes led to worthless litigation.

== Personal life ==
Knowledge of Twyne's private life is derived from his frugal habit of reusing blank sides of letters that he received for making notes upon: in this way, some letters to and from his father between 1596 and 1613 have survived. As a student, Twyne wrote assuring his father that he was working hard, and asking for "money, clothes, books and cheese". He complained that his allowance was not enough to employ someone to carry out tasks such as making the fire, but his father was unsympathetic. He also is shown to be a keen lute player. Later, his father raised the issue of marriage, and Twyne was anxious to put forward reasons why his father's suggestion came at the wrong time, because of (for example) his lack of an income. His father's death in 1613 not only freed him from parental pressure to marry, but also (as the only surviving son) led to his inheriting his father's estate; he remained single for the rest of his life.

== Death and legacy ==
Twyne died on 4 July 1644, having made a will earlier that day in which he left his books and manuscripts to his college and the university. He made some pecuniary bequests to friends and those who had assisted him in his final illness. His manuscript collections amounted to 24 main volumes (about 12,000 pages) with other supplementary material. He was buried in the chapel of Corpus Christi. A hard-working researcher and collector of manuscripts, he was highly regarded and consulted by the legal scholar John Selden, the historian William Camden and Archbishop James Ussher. A later Keeper of the Archives, Strickland Gibson, described him in 1940 as "one of the greatest of Oxford antiquaries". Twyne's collections, he said, were "one of his greatest achievements, and in themselves a monument." They were used extensively by Antony Wood in his history of the university but (noted Gibson) without proper credit being given. He was, however, disliked intensely by the city authorities for his actions against them. As it happens, many of the town's medieval records were lost in the early 17th century and are only known because Twyne had copied them into his collection.

When Twyne was commemorated in 1934, James Patrick Ronaldson Lyell gave the Keeper of the Archives a copy of Twyne's Antiquitatis academiae Oxoniensis apologia.
