= Hoathly =

Hoathly may refer to:

- East Hoathly with Halland, a village and hamlet in East Sussex, England
- West Hoathly, a village in West Sussex, England
