= Anne Bodenham =

English alleged witch (died 1653)

Anne Bodenham (died 1653) was an English woman who was executed for witchcraft.

Anne Bodenham was the assistant of John Lambe, who was killed while being accused of black magic in 1628. She worked as a cunning woman in Salisbury.

She was accused of witchcraft by Anne Styles, who was charged with poison murder at the time. Anne Styles stated that Anne Bodenham had made a pact with Satan and had attempted to convince her to do the same. According to rumours at the time, she could summon demons and transform herself into a dog, lion, bear, wolf, or monkey.

Anne Bodenham was examined for the Devil's mark. She was convicted as charged.

She was executed by hanging in Salisbury in 1653.

== Legacy ==
Her case was the subject of the pamphlet treatise Bower, Edmond. Doctor Lamb Revived, or, Witchcraft Condemned in Anne Bodenham. London: 1653 as well as Doctor Lambs Darling. London: 1653.

Henry More of Cambridge examined the case carefully and presented it as a case of the existence of witchcraft in a book about witchcraft he published in 1655, which was given much authority in a time period when England experienced its last intense witch hunt.
