= Keeper of the Archives =

Position at the University of Oxford

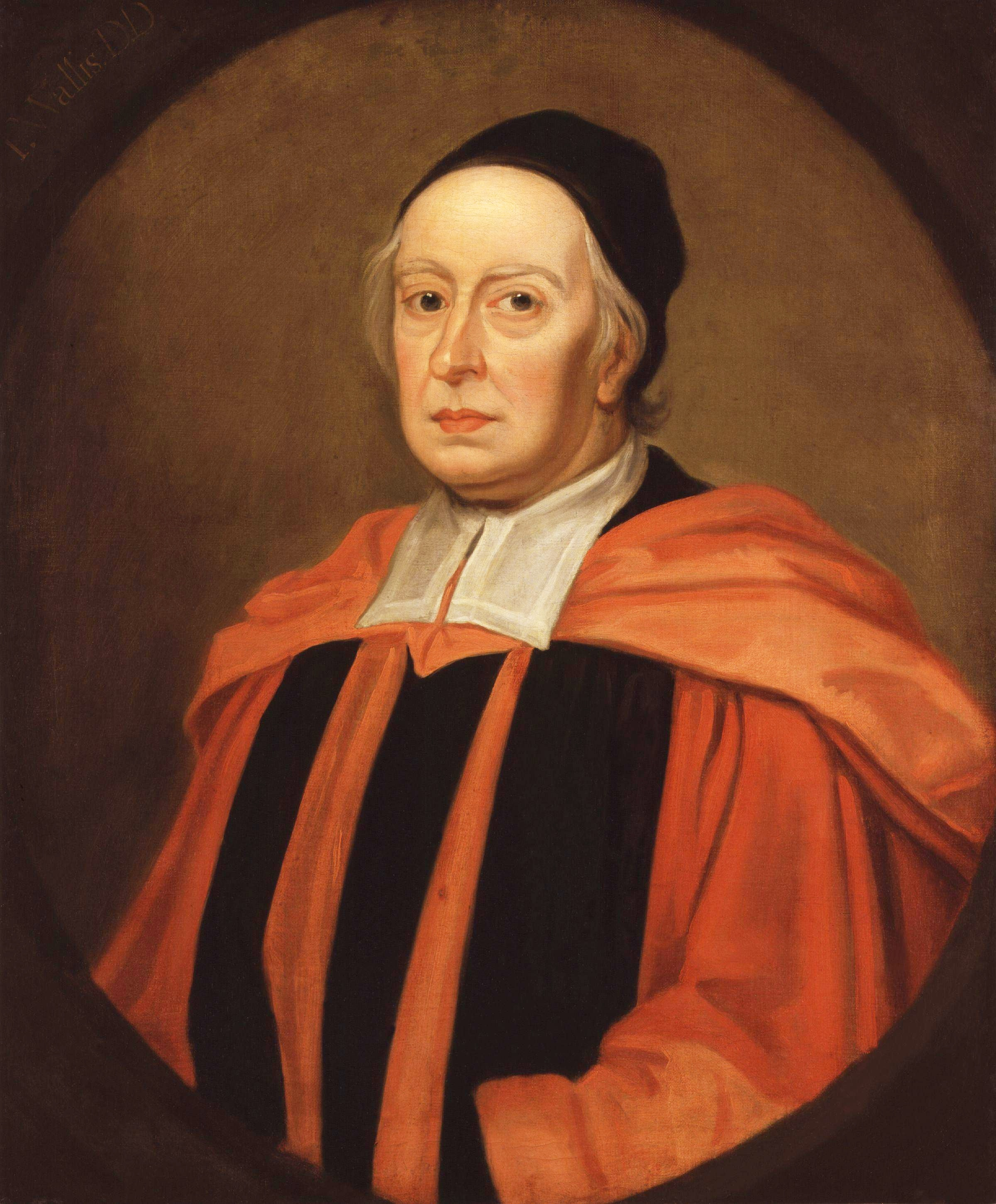
The mathematician John Wallis, Keeper of the Archives from 1658 to 1703.

The position of Keeper of the Archives at the University of Oxford in England dates from 1634, when it was established by new statutes for the university brought in by William Laud (Archbishop of Canterbury and Chancellor of the University). The first holder of the post was Brian Twyne, who prepared an index of the archives in 1631 as part of the preparatory work for the statutes: he was appointed Keeper of the Archives as a reward for his work. The archives were moved from the University Church of St Mary the Virgin into the Tower of the Five Orders in the Bodleian Library under Twyne and his successor, and some of the storage cupboards built at that time are still in use. The archives include charters, title deeds, university registers and records, and other official documentation from the university (but not from the colleges of the university, which keep their own archives). Most of the material dates from the 19th and 20th centuries, with few photographs and no sound or video recordings.

In total, 22 people have held the position. Of Philip Bliss, who was Keeper of the Archives for 31 years in the 19th century, it was said that "his penchant for accumulation seems to have impeded administrative efficiency". Reginald Lane Poole, who was in office from 1909 to 1927, took a much narrower view on what should be kept, and criticised his predecessors for their "fatal inability ... to destroy things when they are done with". The third to hold the position, John Wallis (who was also Savilian Professor of Geometry), prepared an index of the collection that was still used into the 20th century. He was succeeded by Simon Bailey, who was the first full-time Keeper of the Archives. Bailey was previously the Archivist under his predecessor, David Vaisey, but a decision was taken to combine the two posts in 2000. The Archives became part of the Bodleian Library in August 2010. The current Keeper is Faye McLeod.

== History and role ==
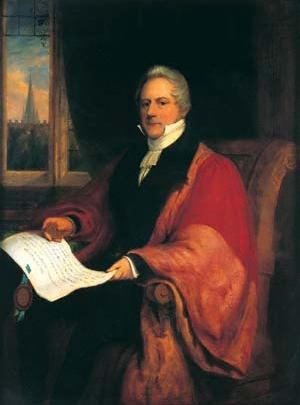
Philip Bliss, Keeper of the Archives from 1826 to 1857.

The position of Keeper of the Archives at the University of Oxford dates from 1634. The university's records pre-date this, and it claims to have one of the longest continuous record-keeping traditions in Britain. Records were initially kept in the Priory of St Frideswide (the site of the present-day Christ Church), moving to the University Church of St Mary the Virgin in the 14th century, where they were housed with money and other valuables. The archives were left in considerable disarray by a burglary in 1544, and remained in chaos until Brian Twyne attended to them in the 17th century. As part of his work as a member of the committee preparing new statutes for the university (at the request of the Chancellor of the University, William Laud), Twyne prepared an index of the archives by 1631, and was appointed the first Keeper of the Archives under the revised statutes in 1634 as a reward for his work. Under Twyne and Gerard Langbaine, his successor as Keeper, the archives were moved into one of the rooms in the Tower of the Five Orders in the Bodleian Library; three of the wooden cupboards that were built at that time to store them are still in use.

The 1634 statutes stated that "the careless keeping of the archives of our University, and the gross ignorance of our privileges" had led to "many mischiefs and losses", particularly in the "almost daily contests with the citizens of Oxford" described by it as "ancient rivals" who "catch at every occasion of impugning our privileges". The statutes provided that "hereafter and for ever, some person shall be sought for", to collect and guard the archives, "that he may produce them without delay whenever occasion requires it". This person was to assist the senior officers of the university and be "an unembarrassed and ready champion in guarding and defending the University privileges and rights." Students at the university (unless exempted by poverty) were to pay 1 shilling towards defence of Oxford's rights, and £40 from this fund was to be paid to the Keeper of the Archives as his salary. Under the 1634 statutes, Convocation (the main governing body of the university at the time) chose the Keeper of the Archives, and there were sometimes contested elections for the position; under the modern statutes, the position is filled by decision of the Committee for the Archives.

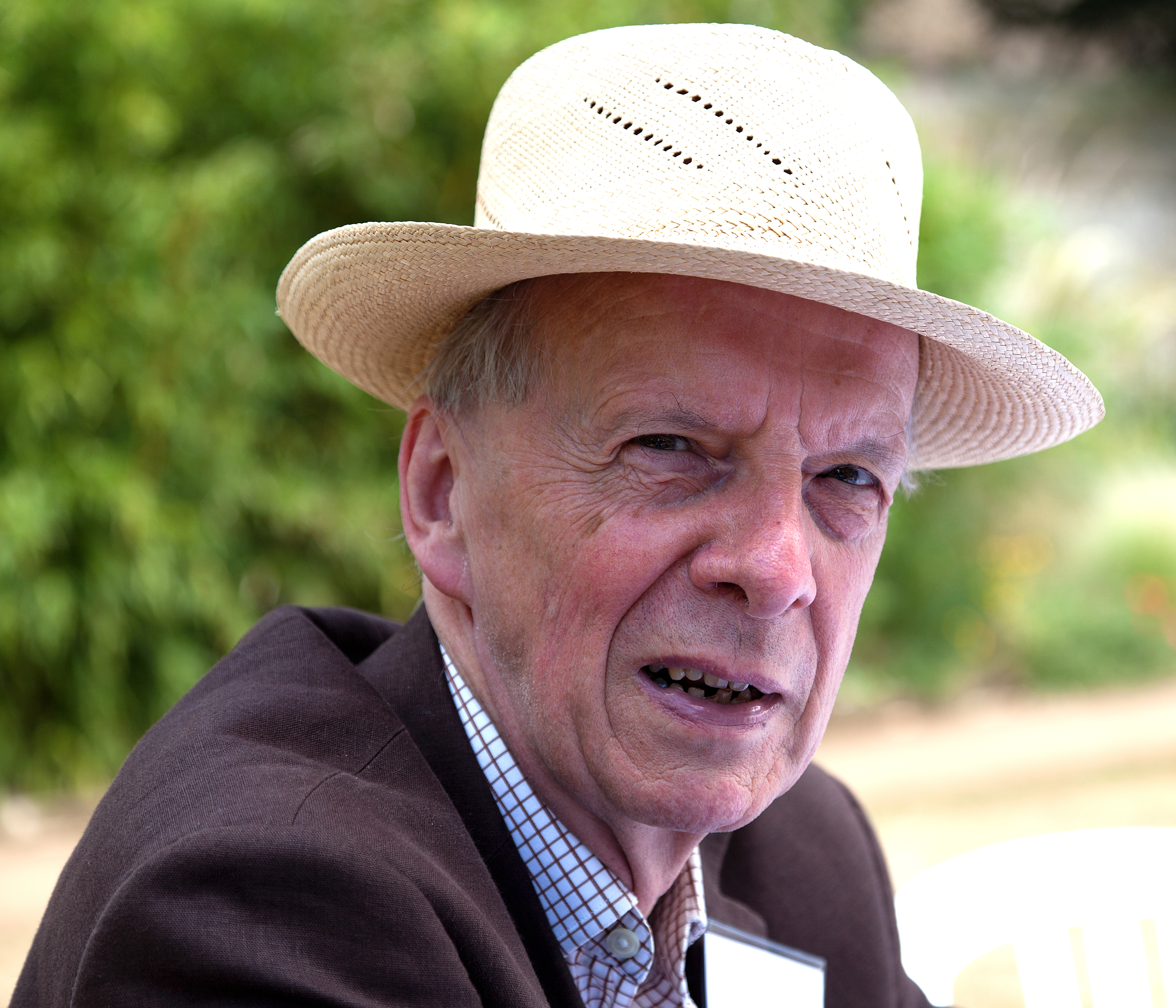
Jeffrey Hackney, who held the position from 1987 to 1995 (pictured in 2010).

The scope of the archives is defined by a university regulation. It includes charters, title deeds, copies of university statutes and regulations, records maintained by the university's Registrar and minutes of meetings, as well as any other official material from the university or its departments that is not in current use and whose preservation is "desirable" in the opinion of the Committee for the Archives. The university archives do not contain material from the colleges of the university, which hold their material separately. The earliest document held, dating from 1214, is a decision of a Papal legate in a dispute between the town of Oxford and the university. The majority of the archives date from the 19th and 20th centuries, and are mainly in paper format, with only a few photographs and no sound or video recordings. The archives became part of the Bodleian Library in August 2010, with the Keeper of the Archives reporting to the library's Keeper of Special Collections and Associate Director. Bailey was the first full-time Keeper of the Archives: he was previously the Archivist under his predecessor, David Vaisey, but a decision was taken to combine the two posts in 2000. The Archives became part of the Bodleian's Archives & Modern Manuscripts division in April 2020 and the current Keeper (Faye McLeod, appointed July 2020) now reports to the library’s Head of Archives & Modern Manuscripts. The Keeper works with an Assistant Keeper (a role split between two people each working part-time) and an Archives Assistant. Some of the holders of the position have been appointed to a Fellowship of one of the colleges; unlike some of the professorships at Oxford, it is not linked to a particular college.

== List of Keepers of the Archives ==
In the table below, "college" indicates the college or hall of the university (if any) at which the individual held an official position, such as a fellowship, during his time as Keeper of the Archives.

Name	Image	Position held	Education (Note: At the University of Oxford, unless otherwise indicated)	College	Notes
Brian Twyne		1634–1644	Corpus Christi College	— (Note: Twyne resigned his fellowship at Corpus Christi by 1623.)	Twyne played a leading role in revising the university's statutes under William Laud (Chancellor of the University and Archbishop of Canterbury) and was appointed as the first Keeper of the Archives as a reward. He also worked extensively on the archives of Corpus Christi. A later Keeper of the Archives, Strickland Gibson, described him as "one of the greatest of Oxford antiquaries", and said that his extensive collection of manuscripts were "one of his greatest achievements, and in themselves a monument."
Gerard Langbaine		1644–1658	The Queen's College	The Queen's College	Langbaine, a Fellow (1633–1646) then the Provost of Queen's (1646–1658), had a wide-ranging interest in Oxford libraries and manuscripts. He helped with the negotiations for Oxford's surrender to the Parliamentary forces during the English Civil War in 1646, and thereafter wrote various documents attempting to protect the university's position from parliament and the city. He made a catalogue of Greek-language manuscripts held by the university and college libraries, and also worked on behalf of the university press. He died in 1658 of "an extreme cold" acquired, it was reported, by sitting in the unheated Bodleian Library during winter and working in his study without food or fire.
John Wallis		1658–1703	University of Cambridge (Emmanuel College)	— (Note: Wallis incorporated as a member of the university through Exeter College, but did not hold a fellowship there.)	Wallis was one of the founding members of the Royal Society, writing over sixty papers and book reviews for it. He was appointed Savilian Professor of Geometry at Oxford in 1649, and was "one of the leading mathematicians of his time": he introduced $\infty$ as the sign for infinity, influenced Isaac Newton with his writings, and took part in various mathematical debates with scholars such as Blaise Pascal and Thomas Hobbes. He became Keeper of the Archives by "a somewhat doubtful procedure", leading to a written protest from the scholar Henry Stubbe. However, he is said to have won over his opponents by his work, ensuring that the archives were kept in excellent order; his index of the collection was still used into the 20th century.
Bernard Gardiner		1703–1726	Magdalen College	All Souls College	Gardiner, a Fellow of All Souls from 1689 and Warden of the college from 1702, also served as Vice-Chancellor of the university from 1712 to 1715. He took steps to ensure that fellows of the Oxford colleges complied with their obligations to reside in Oxford and, for fellows at some colleges, to become priests – a campaign in which he had some, but not complete, success since some of the errant fellows had powerful supporters.
Francis Wise		1726–1767	Trinity College	Trinity College	Wise, under-keeper of the Bodleian Library from 1719, tried but failed to become Bodley's Librarian in 1729 and President of Trinity College in 1731. He did, however, win the election for the position of Keeper of the Archives in 1726, in which he was the only Whig candidate. He carried out no new work with the archives, unlike his predecessors, but worked in areas including as numismatics and Anglo-Saxon studies, attempting the first scholarly edition of Asser's Life of Alfred the Great and endeavouring to sift the genuine medieval text from the later additions.
John Swinton		1767–1777	Wadham College	— (Note: Swinton resigned his fellowship at Wadham in 1743 and later took his Bachelor of Divinity degree through Christ Church, Oxford, but did not hold a college appointment there.)	Swinton travelled to Italy as a chaplain soon after his appointment as a Fellow of Wadham in 1729, returning in 1734. He was involved in a homosexual scandal that caused Robert Thistlethwayte, Warden of Wadham, to resign in 1739; Swinton left his fellowship in 1743 on appointment as a prebendary of St Asaph, north Wales. He had a reputation as a learned scholar of oriental and Arabic topics, writing articles for the Royal Society, of which he was a fellow.
Benjamin Buckler		1777–1781	Oriel College	All Souls College	Buckler was a friend of the lawyer William Blackstone (later the first Vinerian Professor of English Law); both were Fellows of All Souls and supporters of the Tory party, and helped to ensure the election of Tories in positions of power within the university. He also supported in print the tradition of All Souls that a mallard had been discovered in its foundations in 1438 (commemorated in the Mallard Song) against claims that it was only a goose.
Thomas Wenman		1781–1796	University College	All Souls College	Wenman became a Fellow of All Souls in 1765 and a barrister (as a member of the Inner Temple) in 1770. He was the Member of Parliament for Westbury for six years but only made one speech. He also held the position of Regius Professor of Civil Law from 1789 onwards, but stopped lecturing as few students attended. He died in 1796, drowning in the River Cherwell when collecting botanical specimens, one of his hobbies.
Whittington Landon		1796–1815	Worcester College	Worcester College	Landon was elected a Fellow of Worcester in 1782, and became Provost in 1795 (holding this position until his death in 1838). He also served as Vice-Chancellor of the University of Oxford from 1802 to 1806, and was Dean of Exeter from 1813 until his death.
James Ingram		1815–1818	Trinity College	Trinity College	Ingram, a Fellow of Trinity from 1803 onwards, was also Rawlinsonian Professor of Anglo-Saxon (1803 to 1808) and President of Trinity (from 1824 until his death in 1850). His academic interests in Anglo-Saxon and archaeology meant that he had little time to attend to the business of the college or university.
George Leigh Cooke		1818–1826	Balliol College and Corpus Christi College	— (Note: Cooke resigned his fellowship at Corpus Christi in 1815 to marry.)	Cooke was initially a student at Balliol before transferring to Corpus Christi with a scholarship. He was appointed Sedleian Professor of Natural Philosophy in 1810, retaining this post until his death in 1853. He was regarded as a sociable individual, who was one of the main figures of the Literary Dining Club for Oxford academics.
Philip Bliss		1826–1857	St John's College	St John's College and St Mary Hall	Bliss, an antiquarian and book collector, was appointed a Fellow of St John's in 1809 and was also junior sub-librarian at the Bodleian Library from 1822 to 1828. He served as Registrar of the University of Oxford from 1824 to 1853. One writer has stated that "his penchant for accumulation seems to have impeded administrative efficiency", although adding that "his prominence and diligence in university business and his polished manners made him the embodiment of the traditions of ancien régime Oxford." He was principal of St Mary Hall from 1848 until his death in the principal's lodgings in 1857.
John Griffiths		1857–1885	Wadham College	Wadham College (Note: Griffiths was Warden of Wadham from 1871 to 1881; before becoming Keeper of the Archives, he was a Fellow of Wadham from 1830 to 1854.)	Griffiths lectured in classics and divinity at Wadham, and protested against the Anglo-Catholic John Henry Newman's Tract 90. As well as editions of classical texts, he produced works linked to the university's history, including An Index to Wills Proved in the Court of the Chancellor of the University of Oxford (1862), and an edition of the Laudian university statutes (1888). He was appointed to assist Bliss, his predecessor, a few days before Bliss died.
Thomas Vere Bayne		1885–1909	Christ Church	Christ Church	Bayne was a friend from childhood of Charles Dodgson (better known as Lewis Carroll, the author of the Alice in Wonderland stories), and they went on to study and work at the same Oxford college. He was an ordained Anglican priest, and served as university Proctor in 1867. He died in 1908, and was remembered during the oration at the Encaenia of that year.
Reginald Lane Poole		1909–1927	Balliol College	Jesus College and Magdalen College (Note: Poole held a lectureship, but not a fellowship, at Jesus from 1886 to 1910, and a fellowship at Magdalen from 1898 to 1933.)	Poole studied classics, theology and history (obtaining degrees in the latter two subjects) before working for a time in the manuscripts department of the British Museum (now the British Library). Returning to Oxford in 1883 after travel abroad and marriage, he was university lecturer in Diplomatic from 1896 onwards. He was elected Keeper of the Archives, defeating William Henry Stevenson by 250 votes to 95, on 3 June 1909. He was the first to hold the position under revised statutes altering its role, and he described the change as a "glaring falsification of history". He took a very narrow view on what should be kept in the archives, criticising his predecessors for their "fatal inability... to destroy things when they are done with". He resigned his university posts in 1927 when he was 70, his health failing.
Strickland Gibson		1927–1945	St Catherine's Society	— (Note: Gibson did not hold a college appointment.)	Gibson held various posts at the Bodleian Library, rising to Sub-Librarian (1931–1945), and was also a university lecturer in bibliography. His main area of study was book binding, becoming "a master in that field" in the words of The Times. His other publications included studies of Oxford libraries, the ancient statutes of the university, and Oxford's ceremonies. He was awarded the Gold Medal of the Bibliographical Society in 1947 in recognition of his work as a bibliographer.
William Abel Pantin		1946–1969	Christ Church	Oriel College	Pantin lectured at the University of Manchester before returning to Oxford in 1933 to teach history at Oriel; he was a university lecturer in mediaeval archaeology and history from 1937 onwards. His publications included The English Church in the Fourteenth Century (1955) and Oxford Life in Oxford Archives (1972).
Trevor Aston		1969–1985	St John's College	Corpus Christi College	Aston, appointed as a Fellow and Tutor in history at Corpus Christi in 1952, became the first director of research and general editor of the History of the University of Oxford, published in eight volumes (although only one volume appeared before his death). He also edited the historical journal Past & Present from 1960 until his death in 1985.
Jeffrey Hackney		1987–1995	Wadham College	Wadham College	Hackney, a legal academic specialising in property law, law of trusts and legal history, was a Fellow of Wadham from 1976 until his retirement in 2009. Before that, he had studied at Wadham, winning the Vinerian Scholarship for his performance in the Bachelor of Civil Law examinations; he went on to be a Fellow of St Edmund Hall before returning to Wadham. He has also taught at various universities in North America as a visiting professor.
David Vaisey		1995–2000	Exeter College	Exeter College	Vaisey worked at the Bodleian Library from 1963 onwards, becoming Keeper of Western Manuscripts in 1975, and serving as Bodley's Librarian from 1986 to 1996. On his retirement, he was given the title "Bodley's Librarian Emeritus", and became Keeper of the Archives.
Simon Bailey		2000-2020	University of Warwick	Linacre College	Bailey was the first full-time Keeper of the Archives, having previously worked as the university's Archivist when Vaisey was the part-time Keeper. He is also a Fellow of Linacre College.
Faye McLeod		2020 onwards	Brasenose College		McLeod is the first female Keeper of the Archives. Previously, she was Archivist with the Aston Martin Heritage Trust, Jaguar Heritage and finally Archivist and Records Manager for Keble College before taking the post of Keeper of the Archives.
