= Charles Potter (philosopher) =

English philosopher

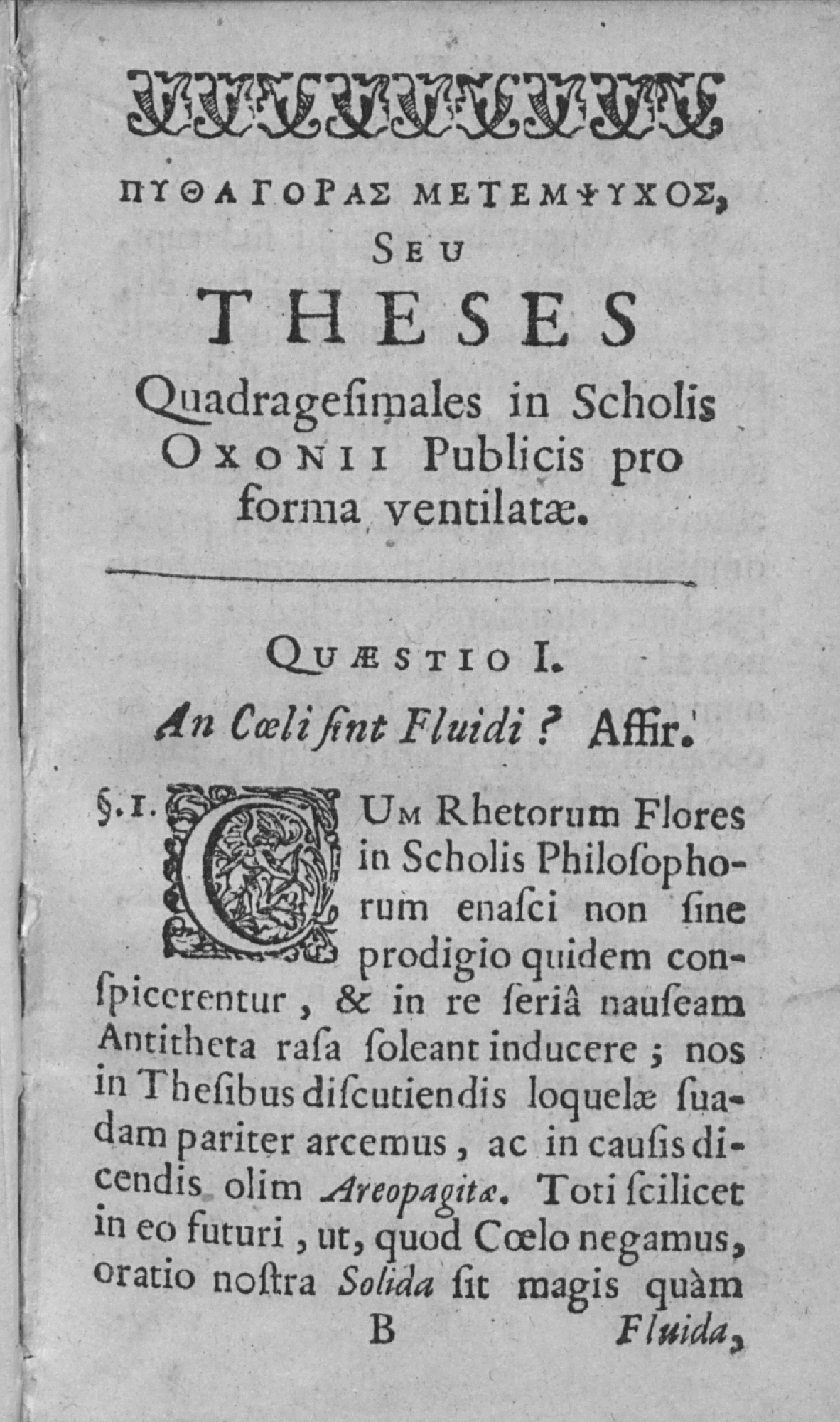
Pythagoras metempsychos, 1684

Charles Potter (1634–1663) was an English philosopher. He was the son of Christopher Potter.

Potter was educated at the Queen's College, Oxford. In 1647 he became student of Christ Church, Oxford, and passed M.A. in 1651.

He joined the exiled court of Charles II and converted to Roman Catholicism. At the Restoration he was made user to Queen Henrietta Maria.

== Works ==
- Pythagoras metempsychos (in Latin). Lugd. Batav: Jordaan Luchtmans. 1684.

== See also ==
- Pythagoras
