= Gerard Langbaine the elder =

English academic and clergyman

Gerard Langbaine, the elder (1609 – 10 February 1658) was an English academic and clergyman, known as a scholar, royalist, and Provost of Queen's College, Oxford during the siege of the city.

== Life ==
He was the son of William Langbaine, born at Barton, Westmoreland, and was educated at the free school at Blencow, Cumberland. He entered Queen's College, Oxford, as 'bateller' 17 April 1625, and was elected 'in munus servientis ad mensam' 17 June 1626. He did not matriculate in the university till 21 November 1628, when he was nineteen years old. He was chosen 'taberdar' of his college 10 June 1630; graduated B.A. 24 July 1630, M.A. 1633, D.D. 1646, and was elected fellow of his college in 1633.

He was vicar of Crosthwaite in the diocese of Carlisle, 15 January 1643, but resided in Oxford. In 1644 he was elected Keeper of the Archives of the university, and on 11 March 1646 was chosen Provost of Queen's College. The city of Oxford was invested at the time by the parliamentary forces, so that the ordinary form of confirmation to the provostship by the archbishop of York was set aside, and Langbaine's election was confirmed with special permission of the king by the bishop of Oxford, and Dr. Steward, John Fell, and Dr. Duche (6 April 1646).

In 1642 he acted as a member of the delegacy, nicknamed by the undergraduates 'the council of war,' which provided for the safety of the city and for Sir John Byron's royalist troops while stationed there. In May 1647 he was a member of the committee to determine the attitude of the university to the threatened parliamentary visitation; he advocated resistance. In November 1647 he carried some of the university's archives to London, and sought permission for counsel to appear on the university's behalf before the London committee of visitors. His efforts produced little result, and on 6 June 1648, shortly after the parliamentary visitors had arrived in Oxford, Langbaine was summoned to appear before them; but the chief visitor, Philip Herbert, 4th Earl of Pembroke, treated him leniently, and he retained his provostship. In January 1649 permission was effectively granted to Langbaine to exercise privileges as provost of Queen's. Next month he joined a sub-delegacy which sought once again to induce the visitors to withdraw their pretensions to direct the internal affairs of the colleges, but the visitors ignored the plea, and appointed a tabarder in 1650 and a fellow in 1651 in Langbaine's college. In April 1652 the committee in London formally restored to him full control of his college.

Langbaine died at Oxford 10 February 1658, and was buried in the old chapel (rebuilt 1713-1719) of Queen's College. A marble memorial to him is described in Wood's History and Antiquities.

== Scholar ==
In 1635 he contributed to the volume of Latin verses commemorating the death of Sir Rowland Cotton of Bellaport, Shropshire. In 1636 he edited, with a Latin translation and Latin notes, Longinus's Greek Treatise on the Sublime. In 1638 Langbaine published a translation of the history of the Council of Trent by Guillaume Ranchin, and dedicated it to Christopher Potter. He also published an examination of the Scotch Covenant.

Langbaine associated with leading scholars of his time. Ben Jonson gave him a copy of Vossius' Greek Historians, which he annotated and ultimately presented to Ralph Bathurst. He corresponded with John Selden. When James Ussher died in 1656 he left his collections for his Chronologia Sacra to Langbaine, to see them into print. Langbaine left the work to be completed by his friend Thomas Barlow, who succeeded him as provost.

Langbaine left twenty-one volumes of collections of notes in manuscript to the Bodleian Library. Some additional volumes were presented by Wood. A detailed description appears in Edward Bernard's Catalogus. According to Anthony Wood, Langbaine worked on catalogues of manuscripts and books in various libraries. In the case of the Bodleian, surviving notes show that Langbaine led a group of two dozen Oxford men who at least planned to divide the library's contents by topic and survey its contents; the interest now in this effort is that the list overlaps strongly with the 'Oxford Club' around John Wilkins at Wadham College, one of the main components which would come to form the Royal Society,

John Fell printed from Langbaine's notes Platonicorum aliquot qui etiam num supersunt, Authorum Graecorum, imprimis, mox et Latinorum syllabus Alphabeticus, and appended it to his Alcinoi in Platonieam Philosophiam Introductio. This later became a standard Oxford textbook on Aristotelian philosophy. In 1721 John Hudson edited a new edition.

In 1651 Langbaine published The Foundation of the University of Oxford, with a Catalogue of the principal Founders and special Benefactors of all the Colleges, and total number of Students, and a similar work relating to Cambridge. Both were based on Scot's Tables of Oxford and Cambridge (1622). Thomas Fuller's statement that Langbaine planned a continuation of Brian Twyne's Apologia Antiq. Acad. Oxon. is denied by Wood on the testimony of his friends Barlow and Lamplugh. In 1654 he energetically pressed on convocation the desirability of reviving the study of civil law at Oxford. He had helped in the preparation of Arthur Duck's posthumous work of Roman law.

== Political writings ==
He is credited with the authorship of Episcopal Inheritance ... or a Reply to the Examination of the Answers to nine reasons of the House of Commons against the Votes of Bishops in Parliament, Oxford, 1641, and of A Review of the Covenant, wherein the originall grounds, means, matters, and ends of it are examined ... and disproved [Bristol], 1644. The latter is a searching examination of the Covenanters' arguments. With a view to strengthening the position of his friends, he also reprinted in 1641 a work of Sir John Cheke. He also helped Robert Sanderson and Richard Zouch to draw up Reasons of the Present Judgment of the University concerning the Solemn League and Covenant (1647), and translated the work into Latin (1648). He was the author, according to Gough, of The Privileges of the University of Oxford in Point of Visitation, clearly evidenced by Letter to an Honourable Personage: together with the Universities' Answer to the Summons of the Visitors, 1647,

Langbaine took a prominent part in a quarrel between the town and university in 1648. The citizens petitioned for the abolition of their annual oath to the university and for their relief from other disabilities. The official Answer of the Chancellor, Masters, and Scholars ... to the Petition, Articles of Grievance, and reasons for the City of Oxon, presented to the Committee for regulating the University, 24 July 1649, Oxford, 1649, is assigned to Langbaine. It was reprinted in 1678 and also in James Harrington's Defence of the Rights of the University, Oxford, 1690.

== Family ==
Langbaine married Elizabeth, eldest daughter of Charles Sunnybank, canon of Windsor, and widow of Christopher Potter, his predecessor in the provostship of Queen's College. By her, he had at least three children including the younger Gerard Langbaine.

== Notes ==
Academic offices
Preceded by Christopher Potter	Provost of The Queen's College, Oxford; 1646–1658	Succeeded by Thomas Barlow
