= Jeffrey Hackney =

Legal academic

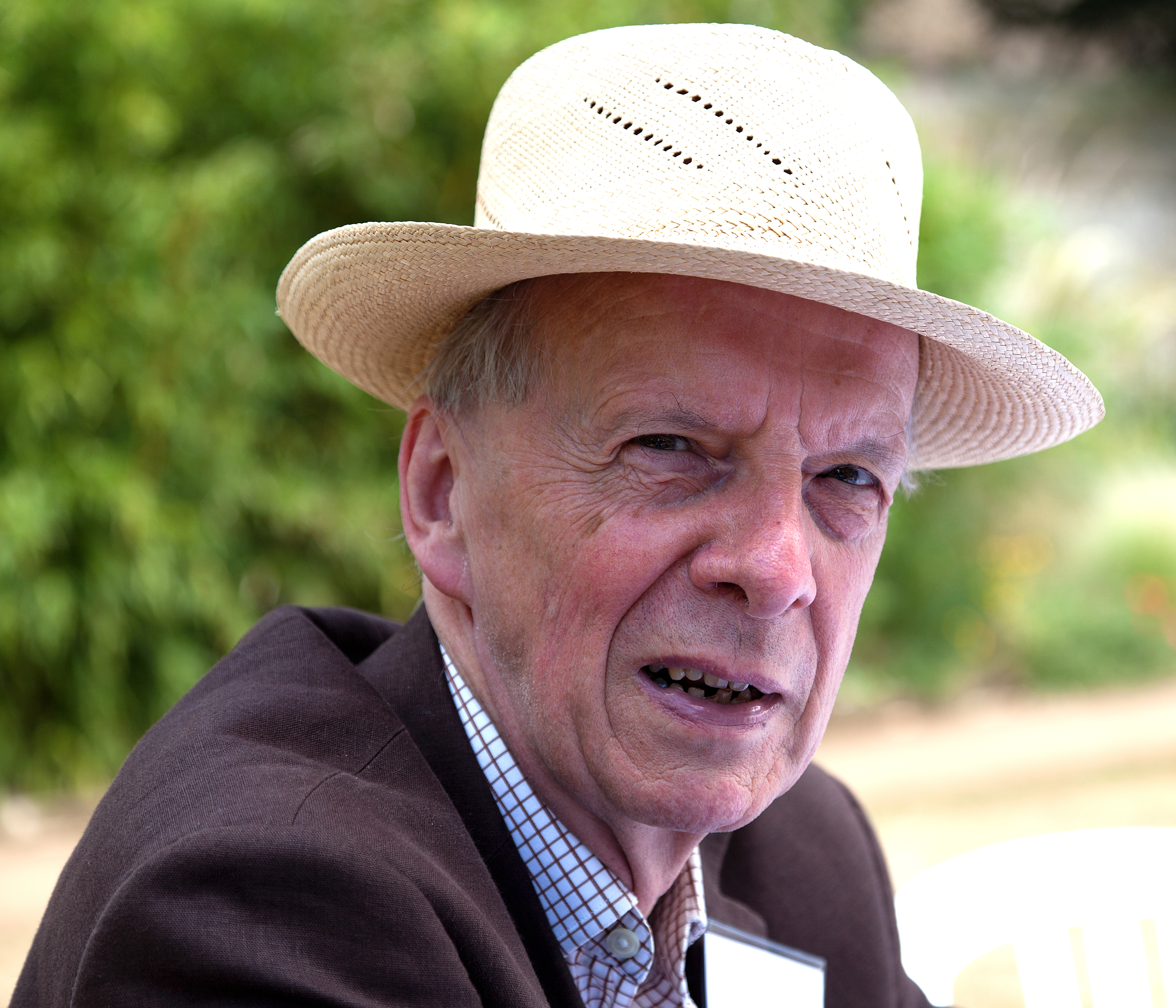
Jeffrey Hackney, July 2010

Jeffrey Hackney (born 5 January 1941) is a legal academic specialising in property law, law of trusts, and legal history at the University of Oxford. He attended Wadham College, University of Oxford. He retired in 2009 from his position as a Fellow of Wadham College, Oxford (a post he had held since 1976), and is now an Emeritus Fellow and Keeper of the Archives for the College. He was previously a Fellow of St Edmund Hall, and has taught at various universities in North America as a visiting professor. He was Keeper of the Archives of the university from 1987 to 1995, and also chaired various university boards, as well as serving on the editorial board of the Oxford Journal of Legal Studies.

He currently holds the University post of Clerk of the Market.

== Bibliography ==
- Hackney, Jeffrey (1996). Understanding Equity and Trusts. Understanding Law (2nd revised; Paperback ed.). London: Sweet & Maxwell. ISBN 978-0-00-686294-9.
- Hackney, Jeffrey (January 2001). "Snell's Equity, 13th ed (book review)". Law Quarterly Review. 117. Stevens and Sons. ISSN 0023-933X.
- Hackney, Jeffrey (2003). "Chapter 2: Usucapio and the Law of Trusts". In Burn, Edward; Getzler, Joshua (eds.). Rationalizing property, equity, and trusts: essays in honour of Edward Burn. London: Butterworths. ISBN 978-0-406-96440-3.
