= Peter Turner (mathematician) =

English mathematician

- Born: 1586; London, England
- Died: January 1652 (aged 65–66); London, England
- Education: University of Oxford
- Scientific career
- Fields: Mathematician
- Workplaces: Gresham College; University of Oxford

Peter Turner (1586–1652) was an English mathematician.

== Life ==
He matriculated at St Mary Hall, Oxford in 1600, and graduated M.A. at Christ Church, Oxford in 1605. He became a Fellow of Merton College, Oxford in 1607.

He gave public lectures as professor of geometry at Gresham College, London from 1620 to 1630. He was an ally of William Laud in his time as Chancellor of the University of Oxford, working with Brian Twyne on a revision of the statutes.

He held the Savilian Chair of Geometry at the University of Oxford from 1631 to 1649. In 1641 he enlisted in the royalist forces of John Byron, 1st Baron Byron. Taken prisoner in an early skirmish of the First English Civil War, near Stow-on-the-Wold, he was eventually released in 1643 in a prisoner exchange. He was ejected from his chair after the 1648 Parliamentary visitation of Oxford, and lived in poverty with his sister in Southwark.

== See also ==
- list of Gresham Professors of Geometry
