= Thomas Turner (diarist) =

English shopkeeper who kept a diary

- Born: 9 June 1729; Groombridge, Speldhurst, Kent, England
- Died: 6 February 1793 (aged 63); East Hoathly, East Sussex
- Resting place: East Hoathly church 50.924977°N 0.161812°E
- Occupation: Shopkeeper
- Known for: Diary
- Spouse(s): Margaret 'Peggy' Slater (15 October 1753 – 23 June 1761); Mary Hicks (19 June 1765 – 6 February 1793)
- Children: Peter (1754–1755); Margaret (1766–1791); Peter (1768–1786); Philip (1769–1829); Frederick (1771–1774); Michael (1773–1810); Frederick (b. & d. 1775); Frederick (b. & d. 1776)

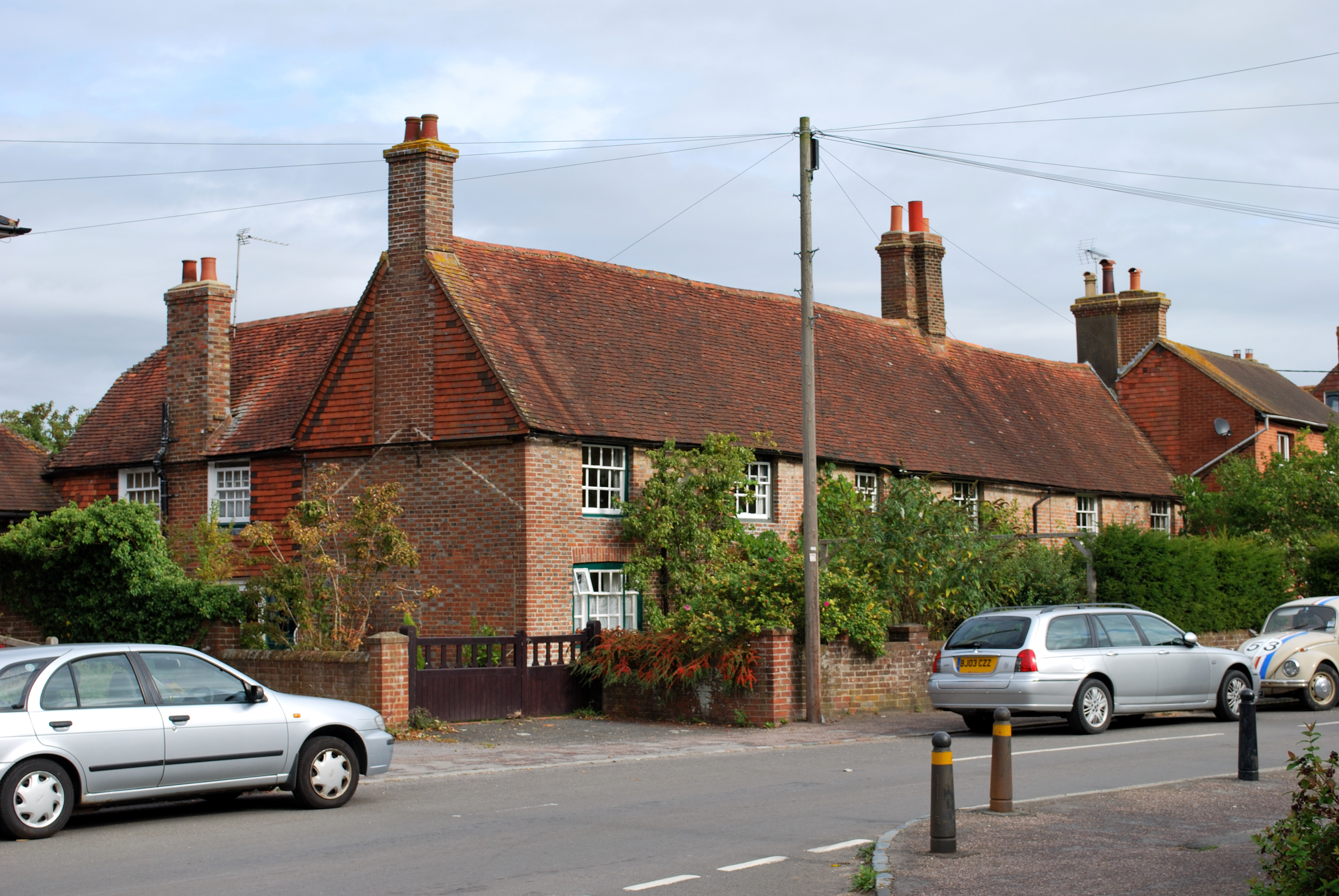
Turner's house in East Hoathly

Thomas Turner (9 June 1729 [OS] – 6 February 1793) was a shopkeeper in East Hoathly, Sussex, England. He is now most widely known for his diary.

== Early life ==
Turner was born at Groombridge in the parish of Speldhurst, Kent. In 1735 Turner's father took a shop in Framfield, Sussex. Little is known about Turner's schooling, but his clear handwriting, practical mathematical abilities and wide intellectual interests suggest a reasonable level of education. By the age of 21, in 1750, he had taken his shop in East Hoathly.

Turner married his first wife, Margaret ('Peggy') Slater (1733–1761) on 15 October 1753. They had one child together, Peter, who was born on 19 August 1754. On 16 January 1755 Turner wrote that "This morning about 1 o'clock I had the misfortune to lose my little boy Peter, aged 21 weeks, 3 days."

== The Diary, 1754–1765 ==
Turner kept a diary for eleven years of his life, the first surviving entry of which is 21 February 1754. The diary served a number of purposes, including as an accounting book, a record of legal and property dealings, a place for religious reflection and as a means of describing Turner's everyday life. The failure of his marriage to live up to Turner's expectations is a frequent cause of his low mood in the diary's entries.

Turner was an important figure in the community of East Hoathly. As well as keeping a shop, he served as an undertaker, schoolmaster, surveyor and overseer of the poor. He helped people write wills, manage accounts and collect taxes. He was a regular participant at vestry meetings and an occasional visitor to the Duke of Newcastle's Halland House.

Aside from socialising and playing cricket, Turner was a keen reader. As well as religious texts, he read works by William Shakespeare, John Locke, Joseph Addison and Samuel Richardson, among many others. Aside from consuming medical treatises, newspapers, periodicals and jestbooks, his interests included farriery, politics and travel. Turner sometimes read alone, but frequently read books aloud with his wife or his friends.

=== Diary manuscript and publication history ===
The diary has never been published in full. David Vaisey's edition retains about one third of its content. The edition also includes a family tree, short biographies of the diary's major characters and a list of Turner's reading material mentioned in Vaisey's extracts. The periodical Sussex Archaeological Collections printed some excerpts from the diary in 1859: the text is now in the public domain, and can be read online. The surviving 111-volume manuscript is held in the Sterling Memorial Library at Yale University.

Vaisey's edition of the diary also cites several documents in the East Sussex Record Office, such as account books and bastardy bonds, which were entirely written by Turner.

== Later life ==
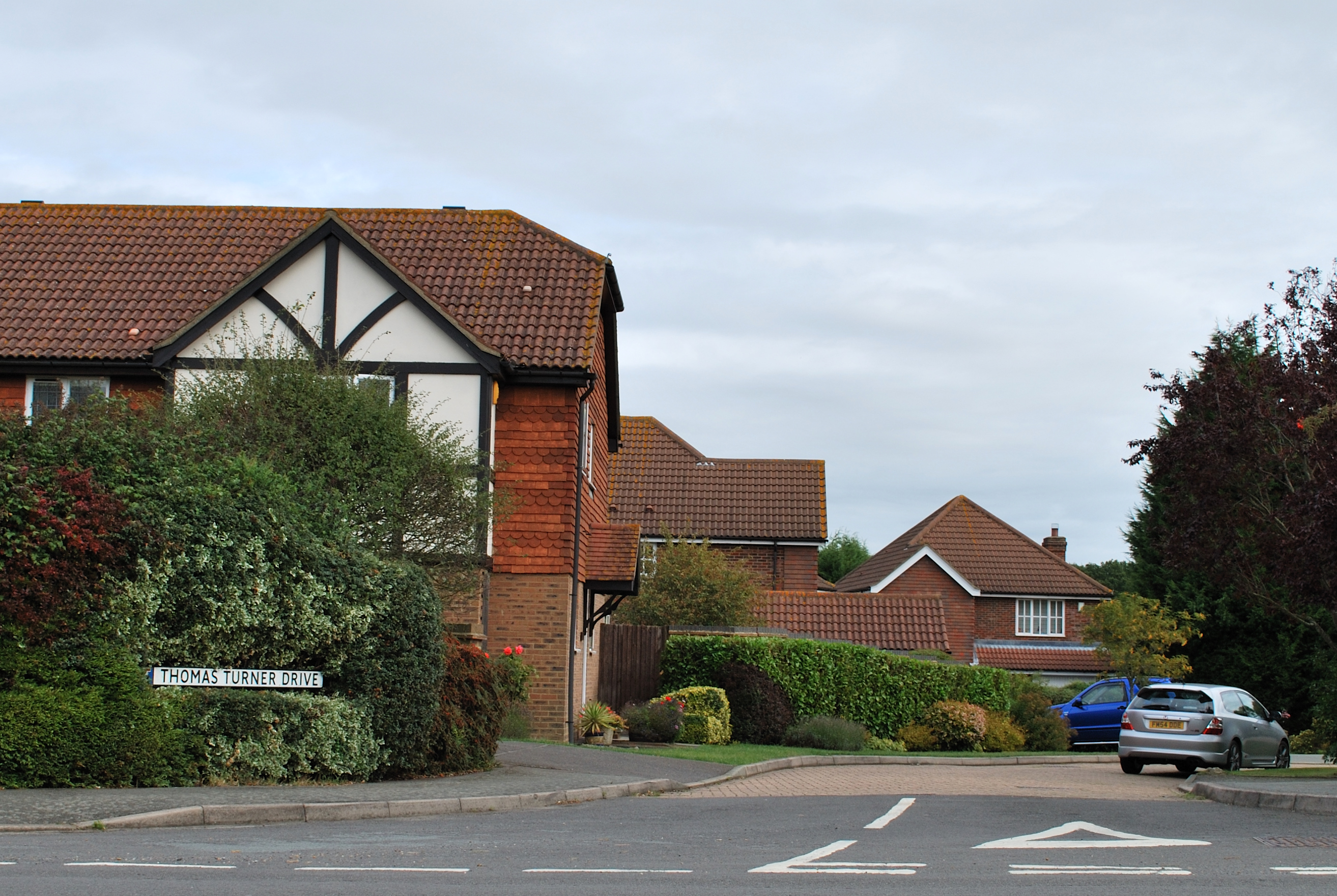
Thomas Turner Drive in East Hoathly

Turner ended his diary a few weeks after his second marriage, to Mary Hicks (1735–1807), on 19 June 1765. The final entry, on 31 July, states that 'I begin once more to be a little settled and am happy in my choice.'

In the years after his second marriage, Turner was able to live comfortably. He bought his shop, and also purchased both land and East Hoathly's main public house. He fathered seven children - one girl and six boys. Only three of the children lived to be older than twenty.

Turner died on 6 February 1793 and was buried in East Hoathly churchyard on 11 February. His gravestone is on the right hand side of the church near the Clements Room, just in front of the table tomb of Philip Turner his son, and Philip's family. There is also a gravestone for Peter and Frederick, sons of Thomas and Mary Turner at the same place. A commemorative plaque marks his house.
