= Simon Bailey (archivist) =

British archivist

Simon Bailey is a British archivist, who was the Keeper of the Archives at the University of Oxford in England until March 2020.

Bailey received his degree from the University of Warwick. He was the first full-time Keeper of the Archives, having previously worked as the university's Archivist when David Vaisey (Bodley's Librarian) was the part-time Keeper.

Simon Bailey became the 21st Keeper of the Archives, following a decision by Oxford University to combine the Keeper and Archivist posts in 2000. The archives became part of the Bodleian Library, the main Oxford University library, in August 2010.

Bailey is a Fellow of Linacre College, Oxford. Bailey's father was the actor Robin Bailey.
