= John Lambe =

English astrologer (c. 1545–1628)

1628 woodcut of Lambe's death from A Brief Description of the Notorious Life of John Lambe.

John Lambe (or Lamb) (c. 1545 – 13 June 1628) was an English astrologer and quack physician who, by around 1625, served George Villiers, 1st Duke of Buckingham as his personal advisor.

Accused of black magic and rape, he was stoned to death by an unruly mob in London.

== Background ==
Little is known about his early life, apart from Lambe being a writing tutor for children in Worcestershire. Sometime after about 1600, Lambe established a reputation as a "cunning man" – that is, someone well-versed in astrology and magic. Calling himself "Doctor Lambe" (though he was not a licensed physician), he claimed that he could read fortunes, identify diseases, repel witchcraft, and locate missing or stolen items with his crystal ball. Rumors also emerged that he was skilled in the dark art of conjuration. Records indicate that he charged approximately 40 to 50 pounds for his services, and he was active in the London-area from approximately 1608 to 1628.

Sometime before 1625, Lambe attracted the attention of George Villiers, a favourite of King Charles I, and he eventually became the Duke's personal adviser. Public opinion of Lambe was roughly split into two camps: those who thought the “doctor” was a nothing more than a quack, and those who believed he actually had magical abilities. The latter referred to Lambe as "the Duke's Devil," and they suspected he was exerting a supernatural influence over Villiers, who in turn influenced King Charles. At the time, Charles was particularly unpopular for his questionable military campaigns and absolutist policies, and a popular chant went as follows:

Who rules the Kingdom? The King.
Who rules the King? The Duke.
Who rules the Duke? The Devil!

== Allegations and execution ==
Over time, many Londoners came forward with their own unusual anecdotes attesting to Lambe's "demonic" or "devilish" nature. Some claimed that he had struck political foes with impotence, and others blamed him for a 1626 whirlwind along the Thames which allegedly unearthed corpses in a churchyard. One of the strangest accounts is recorded in Richard Baxter's 1691 Certainty of the World of Spirits. According to this story, Lambe once invited an audience into an inner room of his house, where he demonstrated his powers by conjuring a miniature tree and three miniature woodsmen, who chopped it down. One man allegedly gathered wood chips from the tree as evidence, but the pieces attracted violent storms to his house, and he soon disposed of them. Sceptics continued to scoff at such accounts, dismissing Lambe as “a notable mountebank and impostor", but many others were firmly convinced that Lambe was a dangerous magician.

Frightened Londoners made several attempts to punish Lambe for black magic, but due to the influence of Charles and Villiers, their campaigns were mostly ineffective. In 1627, however, Lambe was accused of raping an eleven-year-old girl named Joan Seager, and he was promptly sentenced to the death penalty. With the help of his political connections, he was able to postpone the execution for several months. Eventually, though, angry and fearful Londoners became tired of Lambe's special treatment, and on 13 June 1628, an unruly mob stoned him to death as he exited a theatre. No one was punished for the murder, and less than two months later, Villiers was killed as well.

In 1653, four years after Charles I was executed, Lambe's ex-servant Anne Bodenham was also hanged for witchcraft. According to rumours at the time, she could summon demons and transform herself into a dog, lion, bear, wolf, or monkey.

== Lambe in literature ==
Lambe's life and death inspired literary works. An anonymous biography of the astrologer, A Brief Description of the Notorious Life of John Lambe, was published in 1628, and a play, Doctor Lamb and the Witches was released in 1634. In addition, multiple songs and poems were produced about the astrologer, such as "An Epitaph on Dr. Lambe":

Here Dr Lambe, the conjurer lyes,
Against his will untimely dies
The Divell did show himselfe a Glutton
In taking this Lambe before he was a mutton
The Divell in Hell will rost him there
Whom the prentises basted here.
In Hell they wondred when he came
To see among the Goats a Lambe.

Accounts of Lambe's life would also appear in later writings, such as Isaac D'Israeli's Curiosities of Literature and Sir Walter Scott's Letters on Demonology and Witchcraft.
