= David Vaisey =

British librarian (1935–2025)

David George Vaisey, CBE (15 March 1935 – 8 January 2025) was a British librarian who was Bodley's Librarian (head of the Bodleian Library at the University of Oxford) from 1986 until 1996.

== Biography ==
Vaisey was educated at Rendcomb College in Gloucestershire and at Exeter College, Oxford, where he studied Modern History, graduating in 1959, followed by qualification as an archivist at the Bodleian Library in 1960. While performing his National Service he was commissioned as a second lieutenant in the Gloucestershire Regiment on 23 April 1955, and transferred to the Territorial Army on 21 September 1956, and was promoted to acting lieutenant on 28 December 1956. His Who's Who entry states also he served with the King's African Rifles. After working as assistant archivist for Staffordshire County Council between 1960 and 1963, he joined the Bodleian Library in Oxford in 1963, initially as Assistant Librarian before becoming Senior Assistant Librarian, then Keeper of Western Manuscripts at the Bodleian in 1975; he also became a Fellow of Exeter College in 1975. He was, in addition, Deputy Keeper of the Oxford University Archives between 1966 and 1975. He was appointed Bodley's Librarian in 1986, succeeding John Jolliffe who had died in the previous year. He retired from the Bodleian in 1996, with the title of Bodley's Librarian Emeritus, and was appointed a Commander of the Order of the British Empire (CBE) in the Queen's Birthday Honours. Between 1995 and 2000, he was Keeper of the Archives of the university.

Other positions that he has held include a visiting professorship in Library Studies at the University of California Los Angeles (1985), membership of the Royal Commission on Historical Manuscripts (1986 to 1998), and President of the Society of Archivists from 1999 to 2002. He was made an Honorary Fellow of Kellogg College, Oxford in 1996, and was a Fellow of the Society of Antiquaries and the Royal Historical Society. A historian with a particular interest in the use of local source materials, his publications include Staffordshire and The Great Rebellion (1964, jointly), Victorian and Edwardian Oxford from old photographs (1971, jointly), The Diary of Thomas Turner 1754–65 (1984) and various journal articles. Vaisey died on 8 January 2025, at the age of 89.
