= East Hoathly with Halland =

Parish in East Sussex, England

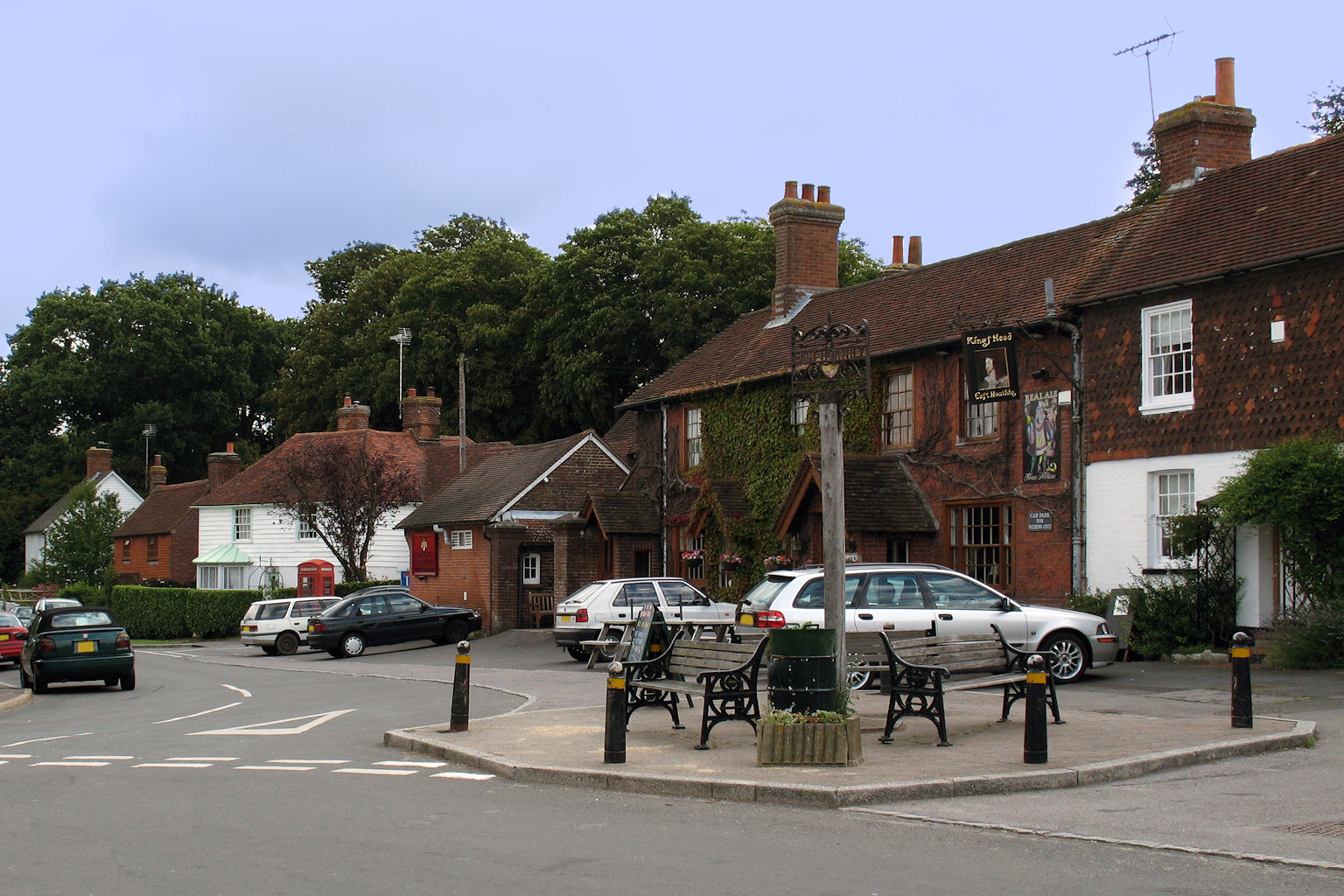
- Public house in East Hoathly

- Location within East Sussex
- Area: 15.1 km^{2} (5.8 sq mi)
- Population: 1,600 (Parish-2011)
  - Density: 229/sq mi (88/km^{2})
- OS grid reference: TQ520161
  - London: 42 miles (68 km) NNW
- Civil parish: East Hoathly with Halland
- District: Wealden
- Shire county: East Sussex
- Region: South East
- Country: England
- Sovereign state: United Kingdom
- Post town: LEWES
- Postcode district: BN8
- Dialling code: 01825
- Police: Sussex
- Fire: East Sussex
- Ambulance: South East Coast
- UK Parliament: Wealden
- Website: Parish Council

East Hoathly with Halland /ˈhoʊðliː/ is a civil parish in the Wealden district of East Sussex, England. The parish contains the two villages of East Hoathly and Halland, two miles (3.2 km) to the west; it sits astride the A22 road, six miles (9.6 km) northwest of Hailsham, although the original sharp bend on that road through East Hoathly has now been bypassed. On 1 April 2000 the parish was renamed from East Hoathly to East Hoathly with Halland.

== East Hoathly ==
The origin of the village name is said to be from the family name of De Hodleigh, landowners in the 12th century. The village was the home of Thomas Turner (1729–1793), a local diarist, in the 18th century. In more modern times it was the birthplace of founding member/keyboard player of the progressive rock band Genesis, Tony Banks.

A Decca Navigator transmitter station was located here, one of four that formed the English Chain 5B. Designated the Green station, with a base frequency of 127.500 kHz, its GPS location was 50.917°N, 00.150°E. John Pratt was the Station Master and he lived on site with his wife and daughters. After the closure the family moved to Hailsham. A combination of legal complications and the advent of the GPS system doomed Decca Navigator, which first saw service on D-Day and was used to guide ships ashore.

== Halland ==
Halland is a much smaller village than its near neighbour, its history is mainly connected with the Pelham family who built a house here in 1595. The local iron industry also had connection here: it is possible that Halland was a stopping place for the teams of oxen taking cannon to Lewes.

On 3 December 2006 the Festival Fireworks factory in nearby Shortgate caught fire detonating the display pyrotechnics stored on the site. Media reports placed the factory within Halland, although it actually falls within the parish of Ringmer.

== Amenities ==
The parish church (which has no dedication) forms a united benefice with that at Chiddingly and there is a Church of England primary school in East Hoathly.

There are two public houses in the parish: The Kings Head in East Hoathly; and The Blacksmiths Arms at Halland. There is also a village recreational area where tennis, cricket and football are played.

East Hoathly has its own bonfire society and holds a huge bonfire event each year around the 5 November. Society members dress in an array of costumes ranging from cowboys and Indians, to Vikings and military personnel.

== Notable residents ==
- Tony Banks of the band Genesis was born here. Charlie Watts, drummer with the Rolling Stones, purchased a mansion in Halland in the summer of 1967.
- The writer Edward Topsell (c.1572-1625) was once Rector of East Hoathly.
- Thomas Turner (9 June 1729 [OS] – 6 February 1793) was a shopkeeper in East Hoathly. He is now most widely known for his diary, which is seen as an important document recording village life in Sussex during the 18th century.
- John Dann, born in East Hoathly, c.1660 son of Thomas Dann (1631-1670) and Mary Deprose (1635-1716?), became a pirate sailing with Henry Every as his coxswain to the Indian Ocean where he took part in one of biggest pirate raids in history.

== Transport ==
Stagecoach in Eastbourne provide bus services between Uckfield and Eastbourne via Hailsham and Polegate.

Uckfield railway station is nearby, with hourly services to London Bridge Station via East Croydon Station.

== Twinnings ==
- Juziers, France since 1995.
