= Barnaby Potter =

English priest

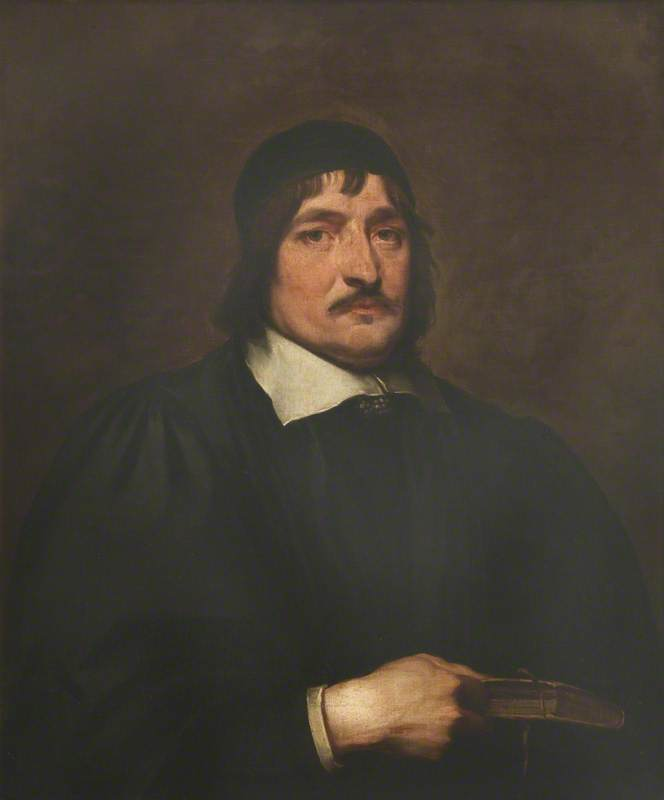
Bishop Potter

Barnaby Potter (1577–1642) was a Church of England priest, Bishop of Carlisle from 16 March 1628-9 to 1642. He was educated at The Queen's College, Oxford, where he graduated MA in 1602 and DD in 1615. He was elected a fellow in 1604 and served as Provost, 1616–1626. Although leaning towards Puritanism he was liked by Charles I, who appointed him Chief Royal Almoner in 1628. He died in January 1641–42.

== Notes ==
Church of England titles
Preceded by Francis White	Bishop of Carlisle; 1629–1642	Succeeded by James Ussher
