= Mallard Song =

Ancient tradition of All Souls College, Oxford

The Mallard Song is an ancient tradition of All Souls' College, Oxford. It is sung every year at the Bursar's Dinner in March and the college's Gaudy in November and also sung in a separate special ceremony once a century.

== The ceremony ==
In the ceremony, Fellows parade around the college with flaming torches, led by a "Lord Mallard" who is carried in a chair, in search of a giant mallard that supposedly flew out of the foundations of the college when it was being built in 1437. The procession is led by an individual carrying a duck — originally dead, now just wooden — tied to the end of a vertical pole. The ceremony was last held in 2001, with Martin Litchfield West acting as Lord Mallard. His predecessor as Lord Mallard was Cosmo Lang, who presided over the centenary ceremony in 1901.

== The song ==
The words of the song are as follows:

The Griffine, Bustard, Turkey & Capon
Lett other hungry Mortalls gape on
And on theire bones with Stomacks fall hard,
But lett All Souls' Men have ye Mallard.

CHORUS:
Hough the bloud of King Edward,
By ye bloud of King Edward,
It was a swapping, swapping mallard!

Some storys strange are told I trow
By Baker, Holinshead & Stow
Of Cocks & Bulls, & other queire things
That happen'd in ye Reignes of theire Kings.

CHORUS

The Romans once admir'd a gander
More than they did theire best Commander,
Because hee saved, if some don't foolle us,
The place named from ye Scull of Tolus.

CHORUS

The Poets fain'd Jove turn'd a Swan,
But lett them prove it if they can.
To mak't appeare it's not att all hard:
Hee was a swapping, swapping mallard.

CHORUS

Hee was swapping all from bill to eye,
Hee was swapping all from wing to thigh;
His swapping tool of generation
Oute swapped all ye wingged Nation.

CHORUS

Then lett us drink and dance a Galliard
in ye Remembrance of ye Mallard,
And as ye Mallard doth in Poole,
Let's dabble, dive & duck in Boule.

CHORUS

== Folk song ==
A folksong (Roud 1517) found in southern England is an accumulative song about the body of the mallard.
