= John Rawlinson (priest) =

English churchman and academic

John Rawlinson (1576 – 1631) was an English churchman and academic who was Principal of St Edmund Hall, Oxford from 1610.

== Life ==
He was son of Robert Rawlinson, merchant tailor of London, and was admitted to Merchant Taylors' School in 1585. He was elected scholar of St John's College, Oxford, in 1591, and graduated B.A. 5 July 1595, and M.A. 21 May 1599. He was acting as a college lecturer by 1599, and is stated to have been master of Reading School in 1600. He was elected a fellow of his college in 1602, taking holy orders and proceeding B.D. 12 November 1605, and D.D. 1 June 1608. He gained a reputation as a preacher.

From 1606 to 1610 he was rector of Taplow, Buckinghamshire; and from 1609 was vicar of Asheldam in Essex. On 1 May 1610 the provost and fellows of The Queen's College, Oxford elected him principal of St. Edmund Hall. He was also made chaplain to Lord Ellesmere, the lord chancellor, and chaplain-in-ordinary to James I, and was instituted to the prebend of Netherbury in Ecclesia at Salisbury, in which at his death he was succeeded by Thomas Fuller.

In 1613 he was inducted to the rectory of Selsey, Sussex, and in the following year to that of Whitchurch, Shropshire. He spent much time in Oxford, where in 1627 he built a new house, and was in confidential relations with William Juxon and William Laud.

He died on 3 February 1631, and was buried on the 10th in the church at Whitchurch.

== Works ==
Rawlinson published numerous separate sermons and one collected volume, entitled 'Quadriga Salutis, foure Quadrigesmal or Lent Sermons preached at Whitehall,’ Oxford, 1625, dedicated to the prince (Charles). He contributed verses to William Vaughan's Golden Grove moralised, 1600.
