= Strickland Gibson =

English librarian and bibliographer

Strickland Gibson (27 January 1877 – 18 February 1958) was an English librarian and bibliographer, who also served as Keeper of the Archives at the University of Oxford from 1927 to 1945.

== Education and professional life ==
Gibson was born on 27 January 1877. He was educated at New College School in Oxford, and then obtained a Bachelor of Arts degree as a member of St Catherine's Society, Oxford (a non-collegiate body that later became St Catherine's College). He held various posts at the Bodleian Library: Assistant (1895–1912); Secretary to Bodley's Librarian (1912–1931); and Sub-Librarian (1931–1945). He became a lecturer in bibliography in the university's Faculty of English in 1923, and was honorary secretary and general editor of the Oxford Bibliographical Society (of which he was a co-founder) from 1922 onwards. He was appointed Keeper of the Archives of the university in June 1927. He retired from his various posts in 1945.

His main area of study was book binding, becoming "a master in that field" in the words of The Times. His main work, written with John Johnson (Printer to the University of Oxford), was Print and Privilege at Oxford to the year 1700, which drew on his knowledge of bibliography and university history. His publications included works on book binding, Oxford libraries, an edition of the ancient statutes of the university, and Oxford's ceremonies; he was also contributor to the Victoria County History volume on the university. He was awarded the Gold Medal of the Bibliographical Society in 1947 in recognition of his work as a bibliographer. He died at his home in Oxford on 18 February 1958.

== Family ==
In 1908, Gibson married Margaret Alice Clinkard (1884–1973). Their daughter, Margaret Ada Gibson, was born in 1910 and a son, Strickland Hillary Gibson, followed in 1914 and died in 1959.
