= House of Khumalo =

Royal family of the Kingdom of Mthwakazi

Khumalo
- Country: Kingdom of Mthwakazi (Matabeleland, Zimbabwe)
- Origin: South Africa
- Founded: 1823
- Founder: Mzilikazi kaMatshobana
- Current head: Bulelani Lobengula as Lobengula II
- Titles: King of Mthwakazi, King of Matabeleland

The House of Khumalo is the reigning royal family of the former Mthwakazi Kingdom (modern day Matabeleland). The Mthwakazi Kingdom was founded in 1823 by Mzilikazi kaMatshobana. While the Mthwakazi Kingdom ended in 1894 with the First Matabele War, The house has endured to the present day.

== Origin ==
It is believed that the Khumalo originated with Khumalo kaMntungwa who settled around the Mkhuze river in Northern KwaZulu-Natal in South Africa. There they lived, predominantly under the yoke of the larger Ndwandwe for several generations. Khumalo kaMntungwa was succeeded by his son Mkhatshwa kaKhumalo, Mkhatshwa kaKhumalo was succeeded by his son Mangethe kaMkhatshwa (Mangethe was also called "Zikode").

The three eldest sons of Mangethe kaMkhatshwa produced the three primary branches of the Khumalo House. They are:

- Mashobane kaMangethe (also called "Matshobane kaZikode"). It is from this branch that the Royal line of Khumalo descends.
- Magawozi "Dloko" kaMangethe (also called "Magawozi kaZikode")
- Gasa kaMangethe (also called "Gasa kaZikode").

== Mashobane kaMangethe ==
In the early 19th century the Khumalo came under pressure to join the Ndwandwe nation due to the expanding power of the Ndwandwe chief, Mashobane's father-in-law, Zwide kaLanga. The alliance was uneasy, and the Khumalos sought help from the leader of the Mthethwa kingdom, Dingiswayo, and his protégé Shaka Zulu.

In the course of an attempted invasion of Zwide's territory, Dingiswayo was captured and put to death by Zwide. Shaka Zulu escaped capture only through the help of Chief Donda kaGasa, as a result of which Zwide ordered the deaths of all three Khumalo chiefs, Bheje kaMagawozi, Donda kaGasa and Mashobane kaMangethe.

== Mzilikazi ==
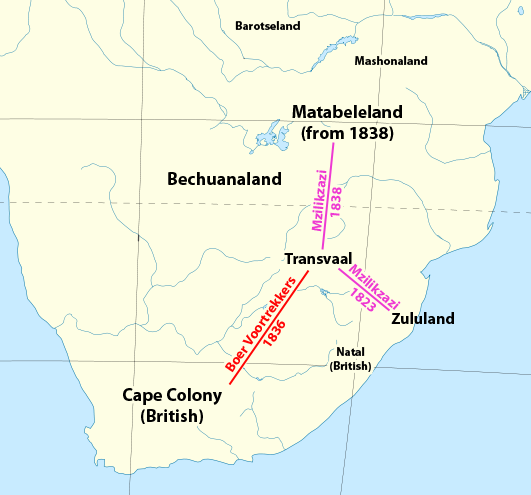
Mzilikazi's migration from Zululand to Matabeleland, 1823 to 1838

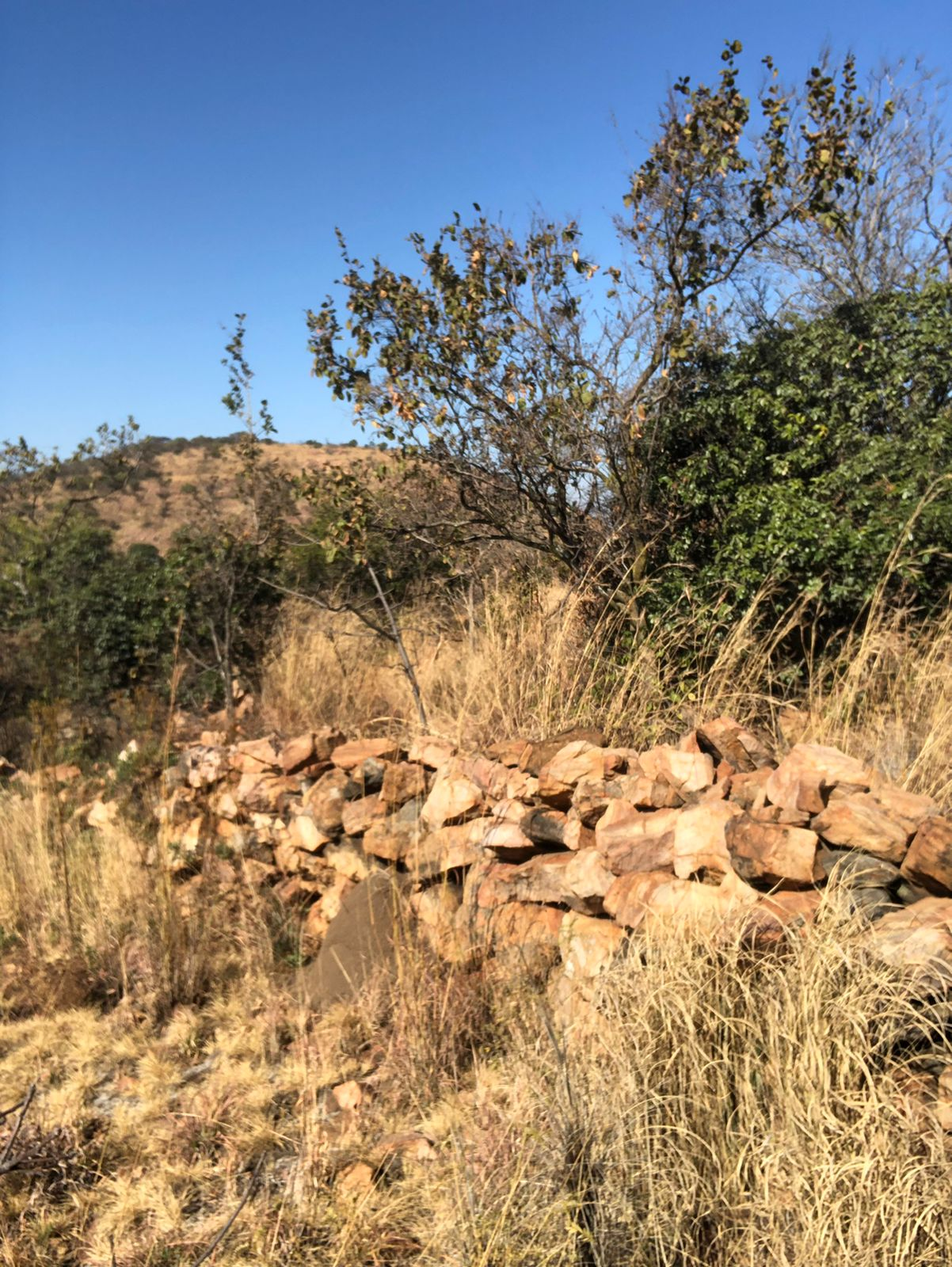
Ruins of Kungwini

Mzilikazi was the eldest son of Mashobane kaMangethe and his heir. His mother was Nompethu KaZwide, daughter of Zwide kaLanga of the Ndwandwe.The only known sibling of Mzilikazi KaMashobana was Ntombizodwa KaMashobana, a respected royal healer and prophetess, often reputed to have the rare ability to summon rain and calm storms.

Mzilikazi's father was killed by Zwide and so Mzilikazi came to be an instrumental lieutenant in Shaka's War. After a personal conflict with Shaka in 1823, Mzilikazi rallied the Khumalos and they left KwaZulu-Natal and moved northward. Mzilikazi established three subsequent settlements along the Magaliesberg Mountain Range.

- Kungwini (meaning "Place of Mist") at present day Wonderboom on the banks of the Apies River. It is commonly believed that Kungwini was established on Meintjieskop, the current site of the Union Buildings. While there is a kraal structure on Meintjieskop dating to this time period, it is not Kungwini.
- Dinaneni was established just north of Hartbeespoort in an area known today as 'Zilkaats Estate'.
- Hlahlandlela would have been in the area north of modern-day Rustenburg.

Of these three Kraals, Kungwini was by far the strongest. From here Mzilikazi's warriors launched raids and attacks on the neighbouring BaKwena ba Môgôpa, BaPô ba Môgale, BaFokeng, Ndzundza and Manala Ndebele. Kungwini's reach extended as far south as Heilbron in the Free State.

Voortrekkers began to arrive in Transvaal in 1836, resulting in several confrontations over the next two years during which Mzilikazi suffered heavy losses. By early 1838, Mzilikazi and his people were forced northwards out of Transvaal altogether and across the Limpopo River. Further attacks caused him to move again, at first westwards into present-day Botswana and then later northwards towards what is now Zambia. He was unable to settle the land there because of the prevalence of tsetse fly which carried diseases fatal to oxen. Mzilikazi therefore moved again, this time southeastwards into what became known as Matabeleland (situated in the southwest of present-day Zimbabwe) and settled there in 1840.

Here he established the Kingdom of Mthwakazi with his capital being koBulawayo.

During the tribe's wanderings north of the Limpopo, Mzilikazi became separated from the bulk of the tribe. They gave him up for dead and hailed his young heir Nkulumane kaMzilikazi as his successor. However, Mzilikazi reappeared after a traumatic journey through the Zambezi Valley and reasserted control.

According to one account, all the chiefs who had chosen Nkulumane were put to death on Mzilikazi's orders. A popular belief is that they were executed by being thrown down a steep cliff on the hill now called Ntabazinduna (Hill of The Chiefs). Mzilikazi's son Nkulumane kaMzilikazi was banished and lived the remainder of his life among the BaFokeng until his death in 1883. His grave, covered in a concrete slab, is on the outskirts of Rustenburg in Phokeng. The site of Nkulumane's grave is incongruously referred to as Mzilikazi's Kop.

Mzilikazi died on 9 September 1868 and buried in a cave at Entumbane, Matobo Hills, Zimbabwe.

Mzilikazi had 13 wives who bore him about 40 children. His successor as the leader of the House of Khumalo and King of the Mthwakazi Kingdom was his son Lobengula kaMzilikazi.

== Lobengula ==
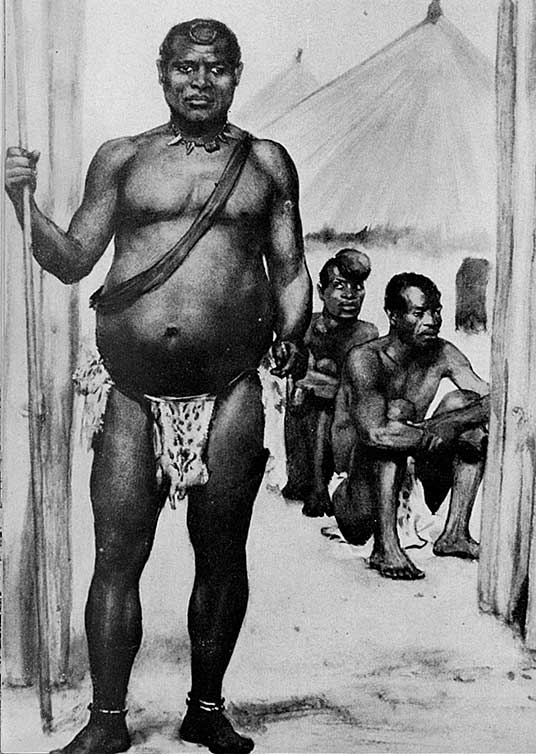
King Lobengula

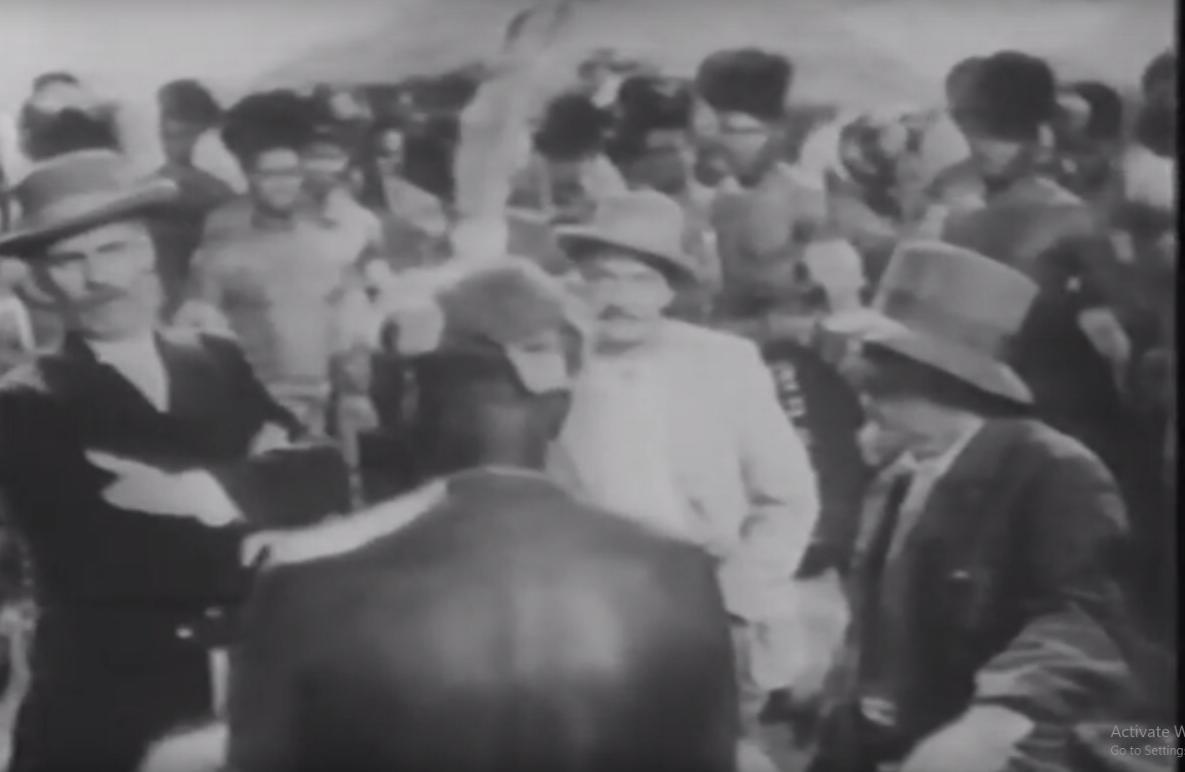
Cecil Rhodes talking to king Lobengula in 1936

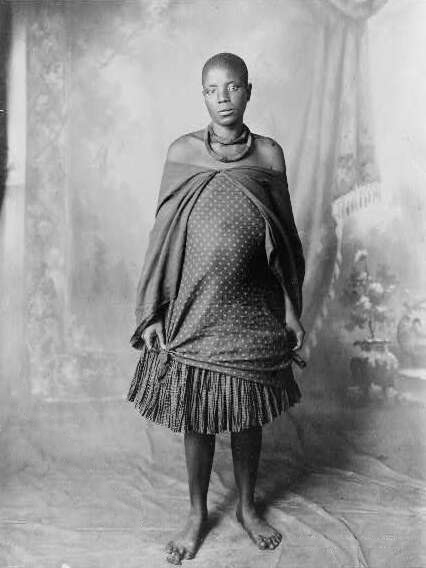
Princess Sigombe, Lobengulas youngest daughter

After the death of Mzilikazi, in 1868, the izinduna, or chiefs, offered the crown to Lobengula kaMzilikazi, one of Mzilikazi's sons from an inferior wife. Several impis (regiments) disputed Lobengula's ascent, and the question was ultimately decided by the arbitration of the assegai, with Lobengula and his impis crushing the rebels. Lobengula's courage in the battle led to his unanimous selection as King.

The coronation of Lobengula took place at Mhlanhlandlela, one of the principal military towns. The Mthwakazi nation assembled in the form of a large semicircle, performed a war dance, and declared their willingness to fight and die for Lobengula. A great number of cattle were slaughtered, and the choicest meats were offered to the Mlimo, the spiritual leader, and to the dead Mzilikazi. Great quantities of millet beer were also consumed.

About 10,000 warriors in full war costume attended the crowning of Lobengula. Their costumes consisted of a headdress and short cape made of black ostrich feathers, a kilt made of leopard or other skins and ornamented with the tails of white cattle. Around their arms they wore similar tails and around their ankles they wore rings of brass and other metals. Their weapons consisted of one or more long spears for throwing and a short stabbing-spear or assegai (also the principal weapon of the Zulu people). For defence, they carried large oval shields of ox-hide, either black, white, red, or speckled according to the impi (regiment) they belonged to.

Lobengula was a big, powerful, man with a soft voice who was well loved by his people but loathed by foreign tribes. He had well over 20 wives, possibly many more; among them were Xwalile, daughter of king Mzila of the Gaza Empire, and Lozikeyi. It is said that he weighed about 19 stone (270 lb; 120 kg). By the time he was in his 40s, his diet of traditional millet beer and beef had caused him to be obese according to European visitors.

Lobengula was aware of the greater firepower of European guns so he mistrusted visitors and discouraged them by maintaining border patrols to monitor all travellers' movements south of Matabeleland. Early in his reign, he had few encounters with white men (although a Christian mission station had been set up at Inyati in 1859), but this changed when gold was discovered on the Witwatersrand within the boundaries of the South African Republic in 1886.

Lobengula had granted John Swinburne the right to search for gold and other minerals on a tract of land in the extreme southwest of Matabeleland along the Tati River between the Shashe River and Ramaquabane river in about 1870, in what became known as the Tati Concession. However, it was not until about 1890 that any significant mining in the area commenced.

Lobengula had been tolerant of the white hunters who came to Matabeleland; he would even go so far as to punish those of his tribe who threatened the whites. But he was wary about negotiation with outsiders, and when a British team (Francis Thompson, Charles Rudd and Rochfort Maguire) came in 1888 to try to persuade him to grant them the right to dig for minerals in additional parts of his territory, the negotiations took many months. Lobengula gave his agreement to Cecil Rhodes only when his friend, Leander Starr Jameson, a qualified medical doctor, who had once treated Lobengula for gout, proposed to secure money and weaponry for the Matabele in addition to a pledge that any people who came to dig would be considered as living in his kingdom. As part of this agreement, and at the insistence of the British, neither the Boers nor the Portuguese would be permitted to settle or gain concessions in Matabeleland. Lobengula sent two emissaries to the British queen, Queen Victoria. However, they were delayed by Alfred Beit's associates at the port. The 25-year Rudd Concession was signed by Lobengula on 30 October 1888.

It soon became obvious that Lobengula had been defrauded and that Beit and Rhodes's team intended to annex his territory. The First Matabele War began in October 1893, and the British South Africa Company's use of the Maxim gun led to devastating losses for the Mthwakazi warriors, notably at the Battle of the Shangani. As early as December 1893, it was reported that Lobengula had been very sick, but his death sometime in early 1894 was kept a secret for many months, and the cause of his death remains inconclusive. By October 1897, the white colonists had successfully settled in much of the territory known later as Rhodesia, and Mthwakazi was no more.

== The Rhodes Four ==
After the death of their father, four of Lobengula's sons were taken by Cecil Rhodes to Cape Town to be given a western education. This was in hopes to alienate them from their culture and royal identity.

- Alban Njube Khumalo was born in 1879 as the 5th son of Lobengula. Although not the oldest, he was considered by both his father and the council of Chiefs to be the best candidate to succeed as leader of the House of Khumalo. Afterwards, he settled in Port Alfred where he bought a farm in the Bathurst area for £600, from the monthly allowance he received from the Administrator in Southern Rhodesia. He died of pneumonia on 10 June 1910 in Grahamstown and was buried there. Alban Njube Khumalo was married twice and had two sons:
  - Albert Lobengula Khumalo, born 1902 and was educated first at the Higher Mission School in Grahamstown, then at Tsolo Agricultural School. He died in 1957.He had five sons: Nduna, Themba, Monani, Vuyo, and Thafetha. Monani and Thafetha had no issues. Themba bore a boy who lives in South Africa and Vuyo had a girl Nduna's had the following children; Thandiwe (late), Jabu (late), Bright (late), Ndumiso (late), Sithembiso, Vincent (late), Mpumelelo (late), Susan (late) and Zanele. Jabu had two children Themba who lives in South Africa and a girl (late). Bright bore Mbonisi and Ndaba. Both live in South Africa. Ndumiso is the father to Thando, Thabo (recently tried to play for Highlanders Football Club) and Prince. The three boys live in South Africa. Vincent and Mpumelelo had girls only.
  - Rhodes Njube Khumalo, born 1903 was educated at the Higher Mission School in Grahamstown and at St Matthew's College in Keiskammahoek from 1919 onwards. He passed his Junior Certificate in 1921 at Loveday College, and moved to Fort Hare in 1922 to finish his matriculation. He later qualified as a teacher. He later settled near Peddie and formed the famous Highlanders Football Club in 1926. He married twice and had four daughters and one son. He died by drowning in a river while out hunting in 1937 and is buried in Grahamstown.
- Mpezeni Khumalo, born 1880, educated at Zonnebloem College in Cape Town where he later died of pneumonia on 9 December 1899 in Somerset Hospital at 19 years of age.
- Nguboyenja Khumalo, born 1881, he was educated as a lawyer and moved back to Bulawayo where he became the first black lawyer in Southern Rhodesia. Later in life he suffered a breakdown and lived the rest of his life as a vagabond. He died in 1944 in Bulawayo.
- Sidojiwa Khumalo, born 1888, was sent back to Bulawayo after a very brief stay in Cape Town. In Bulawayo he was educated at The Anglican Church School in Bulawayo and later at St Augustine's Anglican mission school near Penhalonga. He was briefly employed with the Native Department in Bulawayo in 1918. After retiring he was granted a pension of £2 a month and went to live in Gweru. Later around 1933 his pension was doubled. He died in 1957 and was buried at Entumbane. He married four times and had about 30 children.

== Succession dispute ==
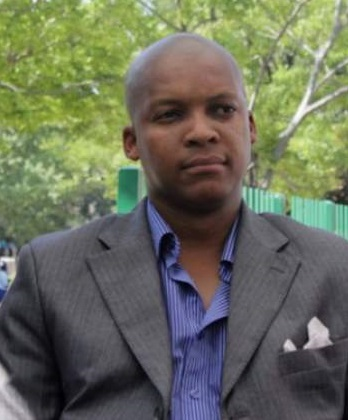
Crown Prince Bulelani Colin Lobengula-Khumalo, heir to the throne of Mthwakazi

In 2016 a man named Stanley Raphael Tshuma claims to have revived the Mthwakazi Kingship and claims therefore to be the rightful leader of the House of Khumalo. Stanley Tshuma has subsequently held a coronation ceremony dubbing himself King Mzilikazi II. His lineage is questionable and only those who descend from Lobengula directly may make a claim to the throne.

To further complicate things the House of Lobengula announced that it had identified Prince Peter Zwide Khumalo to be the next legitimate King. He would identify as King Nyamande Lobengula II. He is the great-grandson of King Lobengula, born of the house of Nyamande. Nyamande who is known to have been chosen by King Lobengula to be the successor to the throne. Zwide has been the most recognisable face in the revival of the Ndebele Monarchy since the 1990s, helping co-found what is now a widely recognised event across the world, The Mzilikazi Commemoration. Zwide's claim is born off the following lineage Mzilikazi - Lobengula - Nyamande - Sumpe - Zwide.

In 2018 a faction of The Khumalo House claimed to have ended speculation over the throne which has remained vacant since 1893 by naming Bulelani Colin Lobengula Khumalo as the only legitimate heir to the House of Khumalo and therefore the Mthwakazi throne. His claim has come under great scrutiny, with members of the House of Lobengula, the only people capable of identifying the next King not having identified Bulelani as such. His claim has largely been reinforced by factions of the Khumalo clan which do not have the legitimate right to identify a king. His claim has further been challenged by his aunt, brother to his father, clearly stating that he has no right to kingship as he has other siblings who are better suited for the role. Bulelani's claim has further been challenged in the court of law by the Lobengula Family Trust, which has exposed the falsehoods associated with his claim. A faction of the Khumalo family supporting Bulelani detailed how Bulelani Lobengula-Khumalo is the rightful heir through the tradition of Inkosi Izala Inkosi which states:

"that one has to have been born to a mother who is married to a king, that even if one is the biological son of the king one is disqualified from taking over the throne if one's mother was married to a prince before he became king. In this instance, all the king’s sons who were born outside the principle of Inkosi Izala Inkosi do not qualify to be considered for the throne. This principle also disqualifies all of their descendants."

King Bulelani Lobengula-Khumalo is the current King as son of Prince Humphrey Mcedisi Lobengula-Khumalo, who is the son of Prince Patrick Fana Boyd Lobengula-Khumalo, who is the son of Prince Rhodes Mpango Lobengula-Khumalo, who is the son of Prince Njube Lobengula Khumalo, who is the son of King Lobengula kaMzilikazi, this means Bulelani is the third-great-grandson of King Lobengula.

== Succession and genealogy ==
=== Mzilikazi KaMashobane's lineage ===
The precise paternal lineage from King Mzilikazi, down to the current traditional leader, King Bulelani Colin Lobengula Khumalo, spans six generations of the Khumalo royal house:

1. King Mzilikazi kaMashobane(Founder & 1st King of the Mthwakazi/Ndebele Kingdom)
2. King Lobengula kaMzilikazi (2nd King, who ruled until the colonial invasion of 1893)
3. Prince Njube Lobengula Khumalo (Exiled to the Eastern Cape, South Africa, by colonial authorities)
4. Prince Rhodes Mpango Lobengula Khumalo
5. Prince Patrick Fana Boyd Lobengula Khumalo
6. Prince Humphrey Mcedisi Lobengula Khumalo (Father of the current king)
7. King Bulelani Colin Lobengula Khumalo (Crowned in 2018 as the contemporary monarch)

=== Ntombizodwa (Mafakasane) KaMashobane's lineage ===
The direct line from Ntombizodwa kaMashobana down to her descendants spans six generations:

1. Ntombizodwa kaMashobana (Mafakasane) (Sister to King Mzilikazi)
2. Zingezile (Child of Ntombizodwa)
3. Sangashane (Son of Zingezile)
4. Tambola Mbedzi Khumalo (Son of Sangashane) who was displaced to Limpopo, Zebediela.
5. Fani Frans Gololo (Son of Tambola) the eldest son of Tambola. Brother of Phoko Miriam Gololo and Nkhulu Chris Gololo.
6. Mandlakazi Catherine Mmankekolo Mphahlele (Daughter of Fani Frans Gololo and Manele Sophy Mphahlele) Mother of Nkosana KaMandlakazi, Mvelamanzini KaMandlakazi, and Ntombenhle KaMandlakazi.

== Notes and references ==
=== Bibliography ===
- Burnham, Frederick Russell (1926). Scouting on Two Continents. Doubleday, Page.
- Cobbing, Julian (1976). "Introduction". The Ndebele Under the Khumalos, 1820-1896 (Doctoral). University of Lancaster.
- Dodds, Glen Lyndon (1998). The Zulus and Matabele: Warrior Nations. Arms and Armour. ISBN 978-1-85409-381-3.
- Hensman, Howard (1900). A History of Rhodesia (PDF). W. Blackwood and Sons.
- Khumalo, Zwide Peter (2023). Ndebele Monarchy Revival (1990 – 2022): The Good, the Bad & the Ugly That You Did Not Know. Lobengula Family Trust. ISBN 979-8390210437.
- Meredith, Martin (2008). Diamonds, Gold, and War: The British, the Boers, and the Making of South Africa. PublicAffairs. ISBN 978-1-58648-677-8.
- Parsons, Neil (1993). A New History of Southern Africa (2nd ed.). London: Macmillan Press. ISBN 978-0-8419-5319-2.
- Sheldon, Kathleen E. (2005). Historical Dictionary of Women in Sub-Saharan Africa. Scarecrow Press. ISBN 978-0-8108-5331-7.
- Wills, W. A.; Collingridge, L. T. (1894). The Downfall of Lobengula: The Cause, History, and Effect of the Matabeli War. The African Review.
