= Northern Ndebele =

Northern Ndebele may refer to:

- Northern Ndebele people, a Bantu nation and ethnic group in Southern Africa
- Northern Ndebele language, an African language
