= Gundwane Ndiweni =

Gundwane "Mkhaliphi" Ndiweni (also known as Khondwane Ndiweni) was a military leader and the first Paramount Chief of Matabeleland. He is credited for founding modern day Matabeleand and Bulawayo in Zimbabwe. He set up the first of the four capitals, Gibixhegu around modern-day Bulawayo. He was also the maternal uncle of King Mzilikazi - a brother to the kings mother, Cikose Ndiweni. He is best known for leading King Mzilikazi's splinter group to settle in Matabeleland after they left Zululand. For military and security reasons, King Mzilikazi split his migrating kingdom into two. One group was led by himself and the other led by Gundwane Ndiweni. Ndiweni's group traveled through central Botswana arriving in the region now known as Matebeleland, near present-day Bulawayo. He appointed Prince Nkulumane, Mzilikali's son as the Prince, a role he served until Mzilikazi reunited with them. It is unclear what happened to him after 1836. His son, Monyebe Ndiweni, narrates that he died bravely in battle defending Mzilikazi. However, it is suggested by some historians that he was executed by Mzilikazi in 1836 along with other prominent leaders for treason due to this appointment and other rumored plots against the King. His own son was Monyebe Ndiweni, who was executed by Mzilikazi in 1862 for allegedly practicing witchcraft.

== See also ==
- Khayisa Ndiweni
- Nhlanhlayamangwe Felix Ndiweni
- Mimi Ndiweni
