= Patrick Hokonya =

Zimbabwean footballer

Patrick Tichaona Hokonya
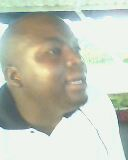
- Patrick Hokonya
- Born: Patrick Tichaona Hokonya; 19 December 1972 (age 53); Bulawayo, Zimbabwe
- Occupations: Chairman of the Zimbabwe Football Association Central Region, Board Member of the Zimbabwe Football Association

Patrick Hokonya (born 19 December 1972) is a Zimbabwean soccer administrator and businessman. Chairman of the Zimbabwe Football Association Central Region also known as Central Soccer League (CSL) and by virtue of this, Board Member of the Zimbabwe Football Association.

Hokonya was born in Bulawayo, Matebeleland. His administration career started off with Zimbabwe Saints Football Club when he was appointed Club Treasurer in the interim committee set up by life members in 2006. He was elected club's Secretary General in 2007 a position he held until his appointment as the Chairman of the Zimbabwe Football Association Central Region. 1. Mr Hokonya is also the Chairman of the Zimbabwe Football Association Players Status Committee
