= Bulelani =

Bulelani is a given name. Notable people with the name include:

- Bulelani Lobengula (born 1984), Zimbabwean politician
- Bulelani Mabhayi (born 1974), South African serial killer and rapist
- Bulelani Mfaco, South African asylum seeker and activist in Ireland
- Bulelani Ngcuka (born 1954), South African lawyer
- Bulelani Vukwana (1973–2002), South African spree killer
