= Nuli, Zimbabwe =

Village in Zimbabwe

Nuli is a place situated in Matabeleland south province in Beibridge Zimbabwe, inhabitants are mostly Venda speaking people. The center is no1, a name that was derived from borehole numbering system. The place is known as Shabwe, a name that was also adopted for the clinic. The popularity of the area derives from the fact that it was a protected village during the liberation struggle. The site of the protective village is popularly known as "khiphini" among the community at Nuli today.

== Schools ==
There is one primary school, Nuli Primary. The school was a relocation of Nuli School pre war of liberation. Post liberation the school at the old site was reopened as Old Nuli School. There is a high school which first opened its doors in 1981 headed by Mr Samuel Makore, later Mr C. Zulu who served at the school until the late 1980s.

Nearby places are no80, tshiborani tsha haSengani, tsbiborani tshahaMunyadziwa, ha Makapile, haLisivhana, haGoda, etc.

The area is under Chief Matibe and Headman Tshinoni. The population is largely of the Mathalise ( Vha i laMbedzi vhaChamukoto) family who were relocated to this area from Mudzinwane along Umzingwane River to the West of BeitBridge.
