= Lovemore Majaivana =

Zimbabwean singer-songwriter (born 1954)

- Also known as: Lovemore Majaivana
- Born: Lovemore Tshuma; 14 December 1952 (age 73); Gwelo, Southern Rhodesia (today Gweru, Zimbabwe)
- Genres: Pop
- Occupation: Singer-songwriter
- Instruments: Vocals guitar multi-instruments
- Years active: 1974–2001
- Label: ZMC

Lovemore Tshuma (born 1954), commonly known as Lovemore Majaivana, is a Zimbabwean musician, arguably the most Popular Ndebele singer, and by far the most prominent to have emerged from Bulawayo. He earned the stage name 'Majaivana' (which means good dancer) for his exceptional dancing.

== Biography ==
=== Early life and career ===
Lovemore Tshuma, aka Majaivana, was born in Gwelo (now Gweru). At the age of four, he moved with his family to Bulawayo, where he sang in the church choir led by his father. By 15, he drummed for the local Bulawayo band, the Hi-Chords. After moving to the capital city, Salisbury (now Harare), he switched to singing in nightclubs, covering Tom Jones and Elvis Presley songs. After playing in Bulawayo for four years, he returned to Salisbury and formed his own band, named Jobs Combination after Job's Nightclub (owned by then businessman Job Kadengu) where the group was the resident band.

At 16, Lovemore's talent was evident. He and his friend Mtshapi built their own first set of drums from plastics and empty cardboard barrels cut in half. They carried these drums all over the local Beer Gardens (Manwele and New Bhawa) in Bulawayo playing to adoring patrons for a meagre fee or whatever the patrons saw fit. This brazen effort by Lovemore paid off a year later because Lovemore would be on a real set of drums. Off in Bulawayo he had young bands in their teens flourishing within the city. There was the Eye of Liberty (Joseph Msonda), Common Five, Live Wire (Late Jonah Sithole). Lovemore became the lead singer for the Hi Chords (Benson, lead guitar, Davy, bass Ruben, rhythm and Vivian, drums, later replaced by another teenager Dave. The Hi Chords flourished under a local businessman Mr. Memo. Unlike the other teenagers, Memo groomed them and gave them a clean-cut image. They wore suits and appeared very professional. That marketing genius by Memo earned the Hi-Chords instant success. They had access to instruments, transportation and good management. Under Memo they travelled extensively in and out of Bulawayo. They played at weddings (Macdonald Hall) the local Boys Clubs. Soon they were playing at bigger venues like the famous Valley Hotel, the Great Northern, Marisha Cocktail Bar and the likes. Lovemore liked to dance also as he sang hence the name Majaivana derivative from the English word "jive". Early songs covered were teeny-bopper, bubblegum and rock then the Tom Jones ballads. They covered the Beatles, Grassroots, Rolling Stones and any top hits between 1968 and 1970.

=== 1974 – early 1980s ===
Jobs Combination involved teaming up with blind singer Fanyana Dube, performing various popular musical idioms. They had several successful singles early on, and their debut album, Isitimela, was a big seller. Despite all this, the band broke up shortly thereafter, and Majaivana sang with the Real Sounds for about two months.

=== Later career ===
The turning point in his career came when he joined the Zulus, a band from Victoria Falls which featured two of his brothers. Finally having a stable base from which to work, Majaivana and his band released an album of traditional folk songs, Salanini Zinini, that he and his brothers had learned from their mother in 1984. From then, he progressed away from his former Western influences, and his popularity steadily grew especially in Ndebele-speaking Matebeleland and Bulawayo in particular. His first international album was released in 1990.

He left Zimbabwe in 2000 and retired from the music business.

== Filmography ==
- A World Apart (1988)

== Discography ==
=== Albums ===
- Isitimela, 1979
- Salanini Zinini, 1984
- Amandla! (Zimbabwean Music – ZIM 003), 1985
- Jiri (Unit Dance Africa – TRA LP 2004), 1987
- Isono Sami, 1993
- Ezilodumo Zikamajee (Zimbabwe Music Corporation), re-released 2011
