= Mthwakazi =

Name of the Ndebele kingdom in Zimbabwe

- 1840–1893
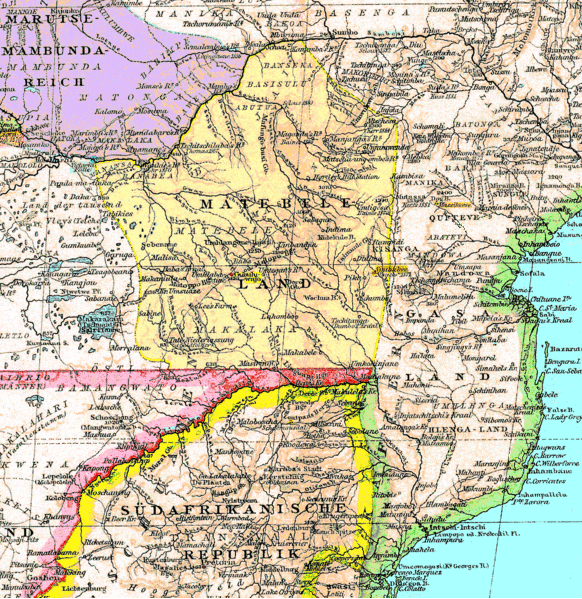
- Capital: Bulawayo
- Common languages: Ndebele
- Government: Constitutional Monarchy
- King-Inkosi
  - 1820–1868: Mzilikazi
  - 1868–1894: Lobengula
  - 2018–present: Bulelani Lobengula
- History
  - Established: 1840
  - First Matabele War: 1895

Area
  - Total: 152,000 km^{2} (59,000 sq mi)
| Preceded by | Succeeded by |
| Rozwi Empire | Company rule in Rhodesia |
- Today part of: Zimbabwe (Matabeleland)

Mthwakazi is the traditional name of the Northern Ndebele people and their kingdom in what is now Matabeleland, Zimbabwe. The kingdom was located between the Sanyati and Limpopo rivers. Additionally, Mthwakazi is widely used to refer to inhabitants of Matebeleland Province in Zimbabwe.

== Etymology ==
The word Matabele is an anglicised term that was used by the British, a spelling that is still common in older texts, because they found it difficult to pronounce the word amaNdebele. Moreover, in the early 19th century, the Ndebele lived in territories populated by Sotho-Tswana peoples who used the plural prefix "ma" for certain types of unfamiliar people or the Nguni prefix "ama", so the British explorers, who were first informed of the existence of the kingdom by Sotho-Tswana communities they encountered on the trip north, were presented two variations of the name, the first being the Sotho-Tswana pronunciation (maTebele or Matabele) and the second being the Ndebele pronunciation (Ndebele or amaNdebele). They are now commonly known as the Ndebele or amaNdebele under Zimbabwean rule (but were officially known as the Matabele under British rule).

== Background ==
The word Mthwakazi was derived from the name of Queen MuThwa, the first ruler of Mthwakazi territory. The Muthwa pseudo-dynasty survived up to around the 18th century. She was the matriarch of the abaThwa, the San people. With the arrival of Bantu people, Mthwakazi territory became, increasingly, a center of diverse cultures. These local groups maintained their local autonomy, however, boundaries were fluid and intermarriages were common. The later arrival of the Nguni peoples, in the late 18th century and early 19th century, saw the intercultural society of Mthwakazi evolving into a sovereign state that was recognized by both neighbouring African states and foreign powers. The area has a long history of diverse cultures and arts. Imbongi (poets) began poetically describing the wonderful social structure of Mthwakazi with references like uMbuthwa okazi (the great collective union).

Mzilikazi is said to have marvelled at the great diverse and collective union saying "Saze sabasihle isizwe sakoMthwakazi, uMbuthwa okazi!, undlela zimhlophe!, njenginsimu yamaluba", loosely translated as: "O, how beautiful, great and diverse the union is. It is like a garden of flowers". Several peace treaties, marking the borders of Mthwakazi, were signed and the new land existed as a nation. However, the colonial powers, occupying the eastern neighbouring state at the time (British Mashonaland Protectorate), later disregarded these agreements and invaded Mthwakazi on 3 November 1893. Mthwakazi fought a bitter defensive battle at Gadade, Mbembesi, but was overpowered by the enemy which used an arsenal of arms which were technologically more advanced than that of Mthwakazi warriors, hence lost and so began a long period of occupation and rule by conquest.

Mzilikazi's settlement in what is now Matabeleland, Zimbabwe, can be described as a transformative and strategic occupation, marked by his establishment of a powerful, centralized Ndebele kingdom.

After leading his followers northward during the Mfecane, Mzilikazi arrived in the region around the 1830s. His arrival brought military strength, Zulu-influenced tactics, and a hierarchical social organization, which were instrumental in his ability to establish dominance. The territory he settled, later called Mthwakazi by the Ndebele, was previously inhabited by groups like the Kalanga and Rozvi, whose societies were impacted by Mzilikazi's expansion.

Mzilikazi's settlement involved both conquest and incorporation: he subdued local communities but also assimilated many of their people into the Ndebele social structure. This assimilation created a multi-ethnic society under Ndebele rule, with a centralized authority that imposed Ndebele language and customs, while allowing for some preservation of local identities within a tributary framework.

Through this process, Mzilikazi transformed Mthwakazi into a cohesive and influential kingdom. His rule brought stability to the area after the disruption of the Mfecane, establishing the Ndebele as a major political and military power in the region, which would remain significant until British colonial occupation in the late 19th century.

These Shona groups built stone structures such as khami and the great Zimbabwe ruins. The ethnic groups which were found in this "unnamed" area are the Kalanga, Venda, Xhosa, Sotho, Nambya, Tonga and the Karanga, Zezuru, Korekore, Ndau and Manyika (made up the eastern Shona dialects). The kingdom united the Kalanga tribe, the Wewuska tribe, the Ngsma tribe and the Tafaka tribe under a strong leadership. This kingdom was often attacked from the south by Vendas and Sotho, east by the Shona and west by the Tswana. His arrival was very welcomed as he gave military support to Mambo's kingdom. Ndebele children played and sang a song, "Kudala kwakunganje, umhlaba uyaphenduka, kwakubusa uMambo no Mzilikazi" loosely translated as "A long time ago, it wasn't like this, Mambo and Mzilikazi ruled together."

One thing to point out was that there were many different tribes living in this large territory. The Kalanga people can be seen in Botswana and Zimbabwe, just like the Nambya and Tonga are both in Zambia and Zimbabwe for example. These tribes and others were assimilated by the Ndebele in Zimbabwe. A strong army was to be established, however, by virtue of Mzilikazi already having a standing army, he became by default the "Commander in Chief of the Armies" (Inkosi yamabutho) and men were enlisted to join his army. The Limpopo river was successfully defended and Mzilikazi became by default the leader of the Mthwakazi. The effects of Mthwakazian success, led by Mzilikazi in campaigns defending the Limpopo line in battles against the Boer attacks of 1847–1851, were so much that it persuaded the government of the South African Republic to sign a peace treaty in 1852. With time, due to absolute power Mzilikazi was gaining, Mthwakazi developed into a Kingdom.

== Mthwakazi under Lobengula's leadership ==
Lobengula, (born c. 1836, Mosega, Transvaal [now in South Africa]—died c. 1894, near Bulawayo, Rhodesia [now Zimbabwe]), second and last king (1870–94) of the Mthwakazi (Matabele) nation. Lobengula—the son of the founder of the Ndebele kingdom, Mzilikazi—was unable to prevent his kingdom from being annexed by the British South Africa Company (BSAC) in 1893.

After Mzilikazi died in September 1868, the succession of Lobengula was not accepted by Mangwane (one of Mzilikazi's older sons) and some of the izinduna (chiefs), and he succeeded to the throne only in 1870 after a period of serious civil war. Lobengula faced a rebellion in June 1870, and in 1872 he repelled an invasion by Mangwane and a pretender backed by the British authorities in the colony of Natal. Lobengula maintained Mthwakazi power over a huge section of (Zimbabwean) highveld until the Witwatersrand gold discoveries of 1886 drew attention to the gold in Mthwakazi kingdom and in the neighbouring Mashonaland. Soon after, a treaty of friendship was signed with the British in February 1888 (the Moffat Treaty), however it was distorted by the British government in order to declare the kingdom a British protectorate.

In October 1888 Lobengula signed a limited mineral concession with a group of Cecil Rhodes's business associates, led by C. D. Rudd, but it too was distorted: manipulated to appear as a gold concession to his entire kingdom, in 1889 it was accepted as authentic by the British government and used to charter the British South Africa Company. Lobengula refused the BSAC access to the areas under his control (Mthwakazi), and in 1890 the BSAC occupied the neighbouring Mashonaland. Due to constant interference and friction between the two sovereign states, a border line was agreed between the Mthwakazi and the British Mashonaland Protectorate.

After British settlers failed to find much gold in Mashonaland, Leander Starr Jameson, the BSAC administrator after 1891, induced settlers and some native Mashonaland inhabitants to join an invading force against Lobengula's Mthwakazi kingdom in September 1893 with promises of gold claims, land, and cattle. To justify the invasion, claims were made that the Ndebele intended to attack Mashonaland. Faced with this attack as well as a simultaneous invasion by imperial troops from the south, Lobengula left his capital, Bulawayo, and the invading forces could not capture him, he disappeared in the direction of the Zambezi River. It is conventionally presumed that he died in late 1893 or early 1894; there is no certainty, however, and there were rumours that he had crossed the Zambezi and found refuge with Mpezeni's Ngoni people in North Eastern Zambia.

== The struggle in Mthwakazi under Rhodesia ==
After the 1893 invasion, Mthwakazi has been ruled by conquest ever since. The existence of Mthwakazi under the "Rule by Conquest" for more than 120 years, has been perpetuated to deny Mthwakazi statehood, subjecting it to alien interest, domination, subjugation and rendering the rulers to corruptly exploit Mthwakazi's economic resources. The "Rule by Conquest" emerged as an unprovoked invasion by mercenaries of the BSAC, and violated the 1888 Moffat Treaty of Peace and Unity. The BSAC was originally promulgated by the British government through a royal charter on 29 October 1889. On 14 August 1893, at Fort Victoria in British Mashonaland Protectorate the BSA Co signed a secret contract called the Victoria Agreement pledging to give each mercenary "a free farm 6,000 acres with the title deed value of 9,000 sovereign pounds, 15 gold reefs, 5 gold alluviums, a share of looted cattle (600,000) one half going to the BSA Co another half being shared equal between officers and men, a share of the Kingdoms' mineral consisting of two 20 liters tins of biscuit one full of pure gold with another one full of uncut diamonds all worth 10 million sovereign pounds and a provision of forced and cheap labour of the conquered people once Mthwakazi was conquered".

On 18 July 1894, the British government promulgated the Matabeleland Order-in-Council, legitimizing the Victoria Agreement as the jurisdiction of Company rule in Rhodesia by conquest as well as the legal bases of the constitution of the "Rule by Conquest". Once the Matabeleland Order-in-Council was in place, the BSA Co proceeded to expropriate all the fruitful lands from the inter-cultural society of Mthwakazi, dispossessed them of 600,000 cattle and any other valuable properties, displacing people by exiling them to the inhabitable two Native Reserves where they remained poor, as forced and cheap labour. The BSA Co promptly formed the conquest government which ruled by terror, imposed deprivation situations against the people of Mthwakazi and opportunity reservations for the rulers. The culture of the Mthwakazi was broken down including the crucial support system that was based on the extended families and had assisted the people to help each other during hard times such as death, famine and disasters, were broken down during displacement. The society got disorganized followed by the personality disorganization and permanent extreme poverty of the whole inter-cultural society of Mthwakazi. In 1923, the British government promulgated the constitution which ruled Mthwakazi jointly with Mashonaland and made the White minority rulers while it left the inter-cultural society of Mthwakazi without franchise. The white minority ruled culminating in the 1970s Bush war which further displacing many of the people.
