= Khayisa Ndiweni =

Khayisa Nhlanhlayamangwe Ndiweni (1913 – 2010) was a chief in Zimbabwe. He was a respected figure in Matabeleland and among his people in Ntabazinduna. He became a chief of the Matebele people of Ntabazinduna and Mbembezi in 1939. He was a direct descendant of Gundwane Ndiweni, the Ndebele leader of the Nguni group that split from King Mzilikazi.

== Political parties ZUPO & UNFP ==
He was a leading figure in the Zimbabwe United People's Organisation (ZUPO) party in the late 1970s.

He left in 1979 to found the United National Federal Party. This was a federalist party which had separatist tendencies. His party won nine seats in the 1979 election but didn't win any in 1980. His party was the only other Black party to win common roll seats. UNFP won 194,446 votes, or 10.97 percent of the vote,85 and were most successful in Matabeleland North and South. This was the first election that allowed all Black Zimbabweans to vote.

== Public service and Lancaster House Conference ==
He served as the Minister for Works in the government of Abel Muzorewa in 1979 to 1980.

He attended the 1979 Lancaster House Conference in London, where Zimbabwe's independence from white minority rule was negotiated. There he advocated for a federation to be created in Zimbabwe which would see Zimbabwe divided into sub-regions. He was an advocate of a federal state for Zimbabwe and a strong critic of the style of governance of Robert Mugabe.

== MDC ==
He was later linked to Zimbabwe's main political opposition party, MDC alliance and played a role in its foundation. Chief Ndiweni and his wife Agnes Masuku were advisors to the founding members of the Movement for Democratic Change.

== Personal life ==
He died in 2010 age 97. He was married to Agnes Masuku. His son is Zimbabwean activist Chief Nhlanhlayamangwe Felix Ndiweni. His granddaughter Mimi Ndiweni is a famous British actress. He is a descendant of Paramount Chief Gundwane Ndiweni.
