= Bulelani Lobengula =

Zimbabwean tribal king

Bulelani Lobengula Khumalo ka Mzilikazi
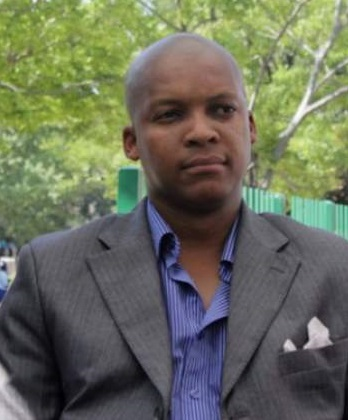
- Reign: 28 September 2018 – present
- Coronation: 28 September 2018
- Predecessor: Lozikeyi
- Born: 11 February 1984 (age 42); Port Elizabeth, Eastern Cape, South Africa
Names
- Bulelani Colin Lobengula Khumalo
- House: House of Khumalo
- Father: Prince Humphrey Mncedisi Lobengula

King Bulelani Lobengula kaMzilikazi Khumalo is a Zimbabwean Ndebele KING of the Northern Ndebele nation also known as Amahlabezulu tribe. His right to the kingship is still in litigation after his brother, Peter Zwide kaLanga Khumalo, challenged it. He succeeded King Lobengula who was overthrown by colonial forces during the 1893 First Matabele War, after which Lozikeyi became queen regent of the Ndebele. His coronation took place in a private ceremony in Bulawayo on 28 September 2018. In 2019 he held his first Imbizo in Beria Park, Johannesburg.

== History ==
King Bulelani Lobengula became the third Ndebele king in September 2018, the first to rule since the disappearance of King Lobengula in 1894. He currently resides in the royal palace Ntabamhlophe. Despite several attempts to temporarily put a pause on his coronation for review and process by the Zimbabwean government, Bulelani Lobengula was crowned in a private ceremony by the Khumalo house.

== 2023 Incwala In Eswatini ==
In 2023, King Bulelani Lobengula attended the Incwala Cultural Festival In Eswatini.
