= Nhlanhlayamangwe Felix Ndiweni =

Ndebele traditional leader from Zimbabwe (born 1963)

Chief Nhlanhlayamangwe Felix Ndiweni
- Born: 1963 (age 62–63); Southern Rhodesia
- Other names: The People's Chief, Felix Ndiweni
- Occupations: Accountant, Chief
- Title: Chief, Inkosi

Chief Nhlanhlayamangwe Felix Ndiweni (born 1963) is a Ndebele traditional leader from Zimbabwe who is known as one of the few traditional leaders to speak out against the ZANU-PF government. He is a Chief in the Matabeleland region of Zimbabwe. Chief Ndiweni lived in Canvey Island, Essex for several years and left the UK in 2010 to assume the Chieftainship in Matabeleland. Ndiweni is well known criticizing the Zimbabwean government for political abuses, land-use abuses and is a supporter of human rights in Zimbabwe. He is known for calling on the Zimbabwean government to recognize the Gukurahundi genocide. In particular, he has also asked for the return of cattle seized from his father, the late Paramount Chief Khayisa Ndiweni and other ZAPU opposition supporters, during the Gukuranhundi in Matabeleland. He has also asked for Ntabazinduna Police Training Depot which was used by the 5th Brigade Military Unit during that time to be restored as a school. He was arrested in 2019 by the Zimbabwean government, granted bail, and currently has a warrant issued by the Zimbabwean government for his arrest because he is regarded as a "security threat" in Zimbabwe.

== Career ==
Chief Ndweni is an accounting auditor by profession and worked at Waltham Forest Council in the UK.

He left the UK to assume the role of chief in Matabeleland which he was appointed by family members using traditional protocols. He was fired as chief in 2019 by President Emerson Dambudzo Mnangagwa who argued that Ndiweni was not the legitimate traditional leader. Mnangagwa ordered his benefits as chief to end including the possession of state-owned items including the state issued car. Supporters argue that a president cannot dethrone a traditional leader and argue that his dethronement was politically motivated.

=== Imprisonment ===
Ndiweni ordered the hedge of a woman accused of adultery to be destroyed in 2019. He went to carry out the ruling with his supporters in accordance to the ruling and was arrested for damaging property.

He was put on trial with 23 of his supporters who received 525 hours of community services. Chief Ndiweni was sentenced to jail for two years under the charge of malicious damage to property worth US$30. He received a six-month suspended sentence. His supporters argue that the sentencing was unfair and politically motivated. Political activists protested his arrest in Zimbabwe on 17 March 2019. A social media campaign under the hashtag #IStandwithNdiweni was also held online.

His jail sentence was appealed by his lawyer, Welshman Ncube, Movement for Democratic Change Alliance Vice-president. Movement for Democratic Change Alliance president Nelson Chamisa visited him while he was in jail at Khami Prison. Additionally, he was granted bail while his appeal was pending. A warrant of arrest was issued for him for violating his bail conditions in December 2021 while he was in the UK receiving medical care. The warrant was issued by police chief Canisious Chesango a week after he petitioned Boris Johnson to support the Zimbabwean Diaspora's voting rights.

=== 2020 Bulawayo attack ===
Chief Ndiweni was attacked at a shopping centre in Bulawayo on 15 May 2020, by unknown youth gang and reported ZANU PF supporters in a bid to confiscate his car.

== Activism ==
=== Gukurahundi Genocide ===
He has been a vocal supporter of survivors of the Gukurahindi and their families. He is known for calling on the Zimbabwean government to recognize the Gukurahundi genocide. In particular, he has also asked for the return of cattle seized from his father and other Zimbabwe African People's Union opposition supporters, the late Paramount Chief Khayisa Ndiweni, during the Gukuranhundi in Matabeleland. He has also asked for Ntabazinduna Police Training Depot which was used during that time to be restored as a school.

=== COP26 protest November 2021 ===
In October 2021, he led a protest at the outside British Prime Minister's offices in opposition to President Emmerson Mnangagwa's invitation to attend the COP26 climate change conference held in Glasgow, Scotland. Mnangagwa attended the conference. Chief Ndiweni appeared at the Protests outside the COP26 Event in Glasgow on 1 and 2 November 2021.

=== My Right to Vote Campaign ===
Ndiweni formed a pressure group with the Movement for Democratic Change Alliance, a Zimbabwean political opposition party, to ask the government to allow the Zimbabwean diaspora to vote. Part of this included delivering a petition to Boris Johnson and the British government to intervene in Zimbabwe's human rights record.

== Media appearances ==
- The Breakfast Club, Centre for Innovation and Technology, 19 December 2019
- In Conversation with Trevor, 13 December 2019

=== Personal ===
He is the son of Chief Khayisa Ndiweni and a descendant of Paramount Chief Gundwane Ndiweni.
