= Mzila =

Gaza Empire king

Mzila Nxumalo

King of the Gaza Empire
- Reign: 1861–1885
- Died: August 1891
- Spouses: 5
- Issue: Xwalile
- Father: Soshangane kaZikode

King Mzila Nxumalo, Mzila kaSoshangane Nxumalo, Umzila, Muzila, or Nyamende was king of the Gaza Empire in 1861. He was the son of Soshangane kaZikode, the founder of the Gaza empire, which at the height of its power stretched from southern Mozambique to the Limpopo River. He defeated his brother Mawewe kaSoshangane in 1861 to ascend to the Gaza throne which he ruled from 1861 to 1885. He was father of King Ngungunyane Nxumalo Gungunhana|Ndungazwe who was deposed by the Portuguese invasion Portuguese Empire.

He ruled Gazaland which was named after his great-grandfather Gasa. During his reign, he ruled with strict military strategies pioneered by Shaka. He was married to four wives, the first wife from the Ndiweni, clan mother of Ndungazwe "Ngungunyane", second wife from the Hlezi clan, third wife was from the Skosana family who never had any children with the king, prompting her to be less respected in the family. Lastly, the youngest and last wife from the Northern King (Mambo Tohwechipi) who later surrendered and consolidated his throne to Mzilikazi kaMashobana.

King Mzila married Princess Ma-Golide to secure an alliance with the northern kingdom, which later became helpful as a place of refuge when he lost the fight with the Portuguese who managed to kidnapped his son Gundunyane. The Portuguese had hoped the king would return for his son but unfortunately it was not possible for King Mzila KaSoshangane KaNxumalo as he had lost many of his soldiers. The Portuguese continued hunting for the king which prompted the king to divide the people he had escaped with into two groups, one group of the Nxumalos was returned to Gazankulu with a changed surname to Chauke and the other remained with the king as Mlilo (thus all Mlilos also call themselves Chauke). King Mzila and the royal family (two wives, Ma-Golide mother of Khutshwa and Ma-Ndiweni mother of Gundunyane) all remained in disguise as Mlilos under Mambo Tohwechipi for safety as the Portuguese continued hunting for him.

The king lived in self-imposed exile, where he later died in August 1891 after a stroke after hearing his sons were taken to Portugal. His death was not revealed for another two months and he was not buried until December of that year, 1891. He was buried in Msapa. To date the location of Mzila's tomb is only known to the last remaining royal family.

Mzila's daughter Xwalile married Lobengula, king of the Ndebele people, along with seven other Gaza royal women in 1879.
