= Xwalile =

Ndebele queen and great wife of Lobengula

- Great Wife of Lobengula
- Spouse: Lobengula (m. 1879)
- Father: Mzila

Xwalile was at one time the great wife of Lobengula, king of the Ndebele people in present-day Zimbabwe. The dates of her birth and death are unknown, but she is known to have lived at least from the 1870s to the 1890s.

Daughter of Mzila, king of the Gaza people, Xwalile married Lobengula in 1879; seven other Gaza royal women married him in the same ceremony, which was designed as an exchange of royal wives. Conflict over the payment of bridewealth soon caused trouble in the marriage, as did the fact that there was a dearth of Ndebele women who would marry Mzila in exchange. Furthermore, she proved to be infertile. Eventually Xwalile was forced to return home; she may in part have been driven away by witchcraft practiced against her by her sister-in-law Mncengence, who would be executed in 1880 for her behavior.
