= Matshobana KaMangete =

Mashobane kaMangethe/Zikode kaMkhatshwa kaKhumalo kaMntungwa kaMbulazi Brothers =Gasa, Magugu, Donda, and Siwela
- Chief of Northern Khumalo tribe, South Africa
- Reign: Late 1700s – c. 1820
- Predecessor: Mangethe/Zikode (Father), Chief of Khumalo tribe, South Africa
- Successor: Mzilikazi
- Born: c. late 1700s Zululand
- Died: c. 1820s
- Spouse: Nompethu KaZwide, daughter of Zwide, Chief of the Ndwandwe people
- Issue: Mzilikazi (son), and others
- House: House of Khumalo; a clan of the Nguni people
- Father: Mangete or Zikode
- Mother: MaNxumalo

Mashobane KaMangethe (c. late 18th century – c. 1820s) was a South African chief, royal healer, witch doctor and cattle herder.

Mashobane, son of chief Mangethe (Zikode), was the chief of the Khumalo tribe: a clan of Nguni people living near the Black Umfolozi river in kwaZulu, in South Africa, and was the father of Mzilikazi the founder of the Ndebele (Matabele) kingdom in Zimbabwe. Matshobana married his first wife, Nompethu KaZwide, who gave birth to Mzilikazi in 1790. He had several children, including his daughter— Ntombizodwa, who was a few years younger than Mzilikazi.

It is said that when Mashobane was in charge of a regiment invading a neighbouring tribe he was caught and had his arm amputated and was later set free.

In the early 19th century the Khumalo came under pressure to join the Ndwandwe nation due to the expanding power of the Ndwandwe chief, Mashobane's father-in-law, Zwide kaLanga. The alliance was uneasy, and the Khumalos sought help from the leader of the Mthethwa kingdom, Dingiswayo, and his protégé Shaka Zulu.

In the course of an attempted invasion of Zwide's territory, Dingiswayo was captured and put to death by Zwide. Shaka Zulu escaped capture only through the help of Chief Donda Khumalo, as a result of which Zwide ordered the deaths of all three Khumalo chiefs, Beje, Donda and Mashobane.

Beje was the only one to escape, Donda was killed and Mashobane was taken captive along with his son, Mzilikazi. In the end Zwide ordered Mashobane to be executed, while Mzilikazi became a lieutenant of Shaka Zulu before leaving him to form the Ndebele kingdom in what is now Zimbabwe.

In the 1986 South African TV series, Shaka Zulu, Mashobane was beheaded by Ndwandwe soldiers and his head given to the Sangoma Queen Ntombazi of the Ndwandwe who was Zwide's mother. Ntombazi was a feared wizard. Ntombazi had warned her son, Zwide about keeping Mashobane's head as that will bring misfortune into the Ndwandwe Kingdom. Indeed misfortune befell the kingdom as she had warned. The Ndwandwe kingdom was attacked, destroyed and Ntombazi was killed. Zwide's sons were killed, and his generals fled.

== Legacy ==
Mashobana’s Direct Descendants

1.King Mzilikazi kaMashobane. Relation: Eldest son and primary heir of Mashobane. Role: Trusted lieutenant under King Shaka who rebelled to become the founding King of the Northern Ndebele nation. Issue: Married at least 13 wives and fathered roughly 40 children. His primary dynastic line continued through his second eldest son, King Lobengula Khumalo (who succeeded him), and his firstborn, Crown Prince Nkulumane Khumalo. Their lines form the foundational backbone of the modern House of Khumalo today.

2. Ntombizodwa kaMashobana (Mafakasane). Relation: Daughter of Mashobana, sister of Mzilikazi. Role: Royal healer and rainmaker. Issue: Mainstream colonial archives state her line was affected when King Shaka assassinated her twin children. Her lineage survives through her later son, Sangashane, down to her grandson Tambola Mbedzi-Khumalo, and eventually to modern descendants like the royal healer Prince Mvelamanzini KaMandlakazi.

3. Zeni KaMashobane Khumalo. Relation: Son of Mashobane, half-brother to Mzilikazi. Role: Zulu-aligned claimant to the Khumalo chieftainship. He famously betrayed Mzilikazi by collaborating with Shaka's elite Ufasimbi regiment to attack Mzilikazi's stronghold at Ngome. Issue: His descendants remained absorbed within the greater KwaZulu-Natal territory, separating from the migrating Ndebele nation and continuing their lineage as part of the broader Zulu Kingdom.

4.Mpondo KaMashobane Khumalo. Relation: Son of Mashobane, half-brother to Mzilikazi. Role: Prince of the early Northern Khumalo clan during the height of the Mfecane conflicts. Issue: Mainstream historical records offer few details on his specific offspring, as his immediate family line remained within the traditional borders of Nguniland rather than joining the transcontinental migration to Matabeleland.

5.Mdonswa KaMashobane Khumalo. Relation: Son of Mashobane, brother/half-brother to Mzilikazi. Role: Royal advisor and military commander who served within the inner circle of the Khumalo house during the clan's foundational transitions. Issue: His branch of the family tree integrated into the broader royal elite structures, with descendants scattered between South African Khumalo houses and Zimbabwe's Matabeleland traditional lineages.
