= Mzilikazi =

King of Matabeleland (c. 1790–1868)

Mzilikazi kaMashobane
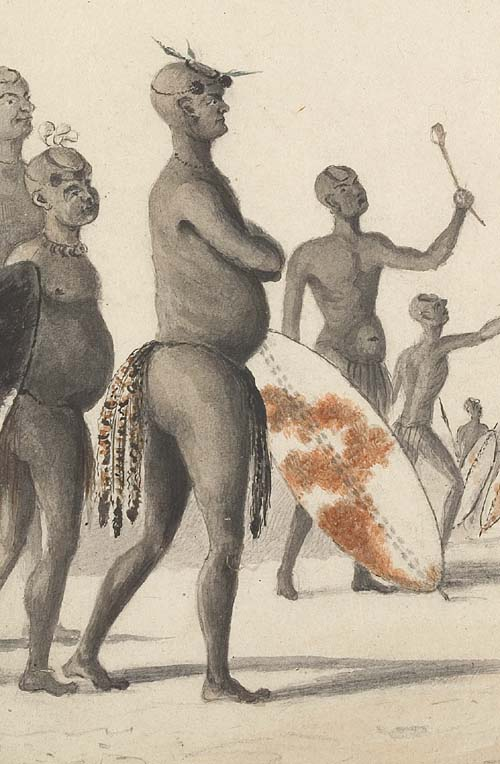
- Mzilikazi, as portrayed by William Cornwallis Harris, c. 1836

King of Mthwakazi
- Reign: c. 1823–1868
- Coronation: c. 1820
- Predecessor: Founder (father murdered; formerly a lieutenant of Zulu King Shaka)
- Successor: Lobengulaas a regent standing for Nkulumane
- Born: c. 1790; Mkuze, present day South Africa
- Died: 9 September 1868; Matabeleland
- Burial: 4 November 1868 a cave at Entumbane, Matobo Hills, Zimbabwe
- Spouse: Several wives
- Issue: Nkulumane first born (son) and Lobengula, from second wife and many others
- House: Khumalo
- Father: Mashobane kaMangethe (c. late 1700s – c. 1820s),
- Mother: Cikose Ndiweni, a princess of the Amangwe clan

Mzilikazi KaMashobane (c. 1790 – 9 September 1868), also known as Mzilikazi Khumalo and recorded in some colonial sources as Moselekatse, meaning "The Great Road", was a Southern African king and founder of the Northern Ndebele, or Matabele, kingdom in what is now Southern Zimbabwe, also known as the Mthwakazi kingdom.

Born near Mkuze in present-day KwaZulu-Natal, Mzilikazi led his followers north from Zululand during the Mfecane, incorporating peoples of other tribes along the way, and established a powerful kingdom in the region later known as Matabeleland. His followers became known as the Ndebele people of Zimbabwe.

Many consider him to be the greatest Southern African military leader after the Zulu king, Shaka. In his autobiography, David Livingstone referred to Mzilikazi as the second most impressive leader he encountered on the African continent.

== Early life ==
Mzilikazi was born the son of Mashobane kaMangeth, chief of the Northern Khumalo clan, around 1790 near Mkuze in present-day kwaZulu-Natal, heartland of the Zulu. His mother was Cikose Ndiweni of amaNgwe.

The Ndwandwe competed against the Mthethwa, headed by Dingiswayo, for land. The Khumalo clan were based on the Black Mfolozi River between the two rival confederacies.

Mzilikazi became chief of his clan after sometime in the 1820s after Mashobane was killed by Zwide for helping Dingiswayo's commander Shaka escape. Mzilikazi swore allegiance to Shaka, who had usurped the Zulu chieftainship and taken over the Mthethwa confederacy after Dingiswayo’s death, and became his lieutenant.

== Leaving Zululand ==
Shaka had originally been satisfied that Mzilikazi had served the Zulu nation well and rewarded Mzilikazi with cattle and soldiers. A rift between the two leaders formed after Shaka assassinated the twins of Mzilikazi's sister, Ntombizodwa Ka Mashobana, who was later known as Mafakasane.

In 1823 Mzilikazi left Nguniland during the Mfecane with a large kraal of Shaka's cattle. It is unclear if Mzilikazi stole Shaka's cattle or if he raided them from neighbouring tribes. Mzilikazi first travelled to present day Mozambique but in 1826 he moved west into the Transvaal due to continued attacks by his enemies, absorbing many members of other tribes as he defeated them. He attacked the Ndzundza kraal at Esikhunjini, where the Ndzundza king Magodongo and others were kidnapped and later killed at the Mkobola river.

For the next ten years, Mzilikazi dominated the Transvaal. Mzilikazi eliminated all opposition and reorganised the captured territory to suit the new Matabele order. In 1831, after winning a battle against the Griqua people, Mzilikazi occupied the Griqua lands near the Ghaapse mountains. He used scorched earth methods to maintain a safe distance from all surrounding kingdoms. The death toll has never been satisfactorily determined.

== Fighting against the Boers ==
Voortrekkers began to arrive in the Transvaal where Mzilikazi was king for 10 years. This resulted in several confrontations of which Mzilikazi won several, until at length the Voortrekkers overpowered Mzilikazi. The battle took two years during which the Matabele suffered heavy losses. By early 1838, Mzilikazi and his people were forced northwards and out of Transvaal altogether, across the Limpopo River. He decided to split his group in two. One of these groups moved north under military leader by Nkulumane, Mzilikazi's first born son, and Gundwane Ndiweni, who conducted a section of the Ndebele across the Limpopo without Mzilikazi.

Further attacks caused Mzilikazi to move again, at first westwards into present-day Botswana and then later northwards towards what is now Zambia. He was unable to settle the land there because of the prevalence of tsetse fly which carried diseases fatal to oxen. Mzilikazi therefore travelled again, this time southeastwards into what became known as Matabeleland (situated in the southwest of present-day Zimbabwe) and settled there in 1840 where he reunited with the splinter group led by Ndiweni and Nkulumane Mzilikazi.

After his arrival, he organised his followers into a militaristic system with regimental kraals, similar to those of Shaka; under his leadership, the Matabele became strong enough to repel the Boer attacks of 1847–1851 and persuade the government of the South African Republic to sign a peace treaty with Mzilikazi in 1852.

== Matabele Kingdom ==
While Mzilikazi was generally friendly to European travellers, he remained mindful of the danger that they posed to his kingdom. In later years he refused some visitors access to his realm. The Europeans who met Mzilikazi included Henry Hartley, hunter and explorer; Robert Moffat, missionary; John Mackenzie, missionary; David Hume, explorer and trader; Andrew Smith, surgeon, ethnologist and zoologist; William Cornwallis Harris, hunter; the missionary explorer David Livingstone; and the German explorer Karl Mauch.

After he was defeated by the Voortrekker Boers in Transvaal during the tribe's wanderings north of the Limpopo, Mzilikazi became separated from the bulk of the tribe. They gave him up for dead and hailed his young heir Nkulumane as his successor. However, Mzilikazi reappeared after a traumatic journey through the Zambezi Valley and reasserted control. According to one account, his son and all the chiefs who had chosen him were put to death on his orders. A popular belief is that they were executed by being thrown down a steep cliff on the hill now called Ntabazinduna ("hill of the chiefs").

Another account relates that Nkulumane was not killed with the chiefs, but was sent back to the Zulu Kingdom with a sizeable delegation which included warriors. During his journey south, he passed through the Bakwena territory in the northwestern Transvaal, near Rustenburg. At the time the Bakwena were struggling to repel repeated attacks from a neighbouring king, who laid claim to the territory that they occupied. Nkulumane assisted the Bakwena by leading his impi in a battle in which Nkulumane himself killed the neighbouring chief.

Following this victory, the Bakwena convinced Nkulumane to settle in their territory, arguing that it would be futile to return to the Zulu Kingdom as his father's enemies would probably kill him. Nkulumane settled and lived with his family in that area until his death in 1883. His grave, covered in a concrete slab, is on the outskirts of Rustenburg in Phokeng. The site of Nkulumane's grave is incongruously referred to as Mzilikazi's Kop, even though it is his son who is buried there.

After resuming his role as king, Mzilikazi founded his nation at Ntabazinduna mountain and his first capital was at Inyathi where he ended up meeting his old friend Robert Moffat whom he had met in the Transvaal Republic when he was coming from Kuruman which was the year when his son (Nkulumane) was born, Inyathi was abandoned in 1859 when one of his senior wives, Queen Loziba, died. His next capital was established at Mhlahlandlela in Matopo District where he is buried. This became his second and last capital until he died at eNqameni near Gwanda on 5 September 1868.

== Legacy ==
Mzilikazi’s Direct Descendants (The Royal Line)

King Mzilikazi kaMashobane, founder of the Ndebele (Matabele) kingdom, established a large royal household with multiple wives and many children during his reign in the 19th century.

Historical accounts agree that he fathered numerous children, though exact numbers vary across sources and oral traditions.

Primary heirs within the royal succession tradition include:

1. Crown Prince Nkulumane Khumalo Nkulumane is widely recorded as Mzilikazi’s eldest son and initial designated heir. Some historical accounts state that he was involved in a succession dispute during the period when Mzilikazi crossed the Zambezi region, and later disappeared from royal succession narratives, though historians debate the exact circumstances of his removal or exile.

2. King Lobengula Khumalo Lobengula kaMzilikazi succeeded as King of the Ndebele around 1870, becoming the second and final independent monarch of the Ndebele kingdom before its defeat in the First Matabele War (1893).

He is identified in historical sources as a son of Mzilikazi, born to one of his wives, whose identity is recorded differently across oral and written traditions.

Mzilikazi was succeeded by his son Lobengula. The territorial and political gains Mzilikazi had accrued over his life were short lived, however, after gold was discovered by the Europeans one year before his death. This discovery soon drew Cecil Rhodes and the British South Africa Company into the region, culminating in the Rudd Concession and, ultimately, the Matabeleland Wars. Within thirty years the British had conquered Matabeleland and absorbed it as a province of Rhodesia.

The current leadership of the Khumalo family continues with King Bulelani Lobengula Khumalo, who was crowned as the king of the Ndebele nation, and he is connected to other royal houses, including the Zulu royal family, through the broader Nguni heritage, with shared ancestral roots linking him indirectly to King Misuzulu kaZwelithini of the Zulu Kingdom.

=== Commemoration ===
In 1941, the Rhodesian government erected a memorial to Mzilikazi that remains a popular site of homage to this day.

In 1970, the City of Bulawayo established Mzilikazi Memorial Library, the city's central library. The king's bust was placed at the entrance of the library in celebration of his centenary.

Every year in September, thousands of people gather at the Mhlahlandlela (Mzilikazi Memorial Site) near Bulawayo to commemorate King Mzilikazi, the founder of the Ndebele (Mthwakazi) state. The event includes traditional dances, poetry, historical storytelling, and cultural performances, and is organised by cultural bodies such as the Mthwakazi kaMzilikazi Cultural Association (MMCA), together with traditional leaders and descendants of the House of Khumalo. The commemorations serve as an important cultural gathering that reinforces historical memory and identity among younger generations of the Ndebele nation and broader Matabeleland communities.

He is portrayed by actor Mpilo Mbatha in the television drama series Shaka iLembe.

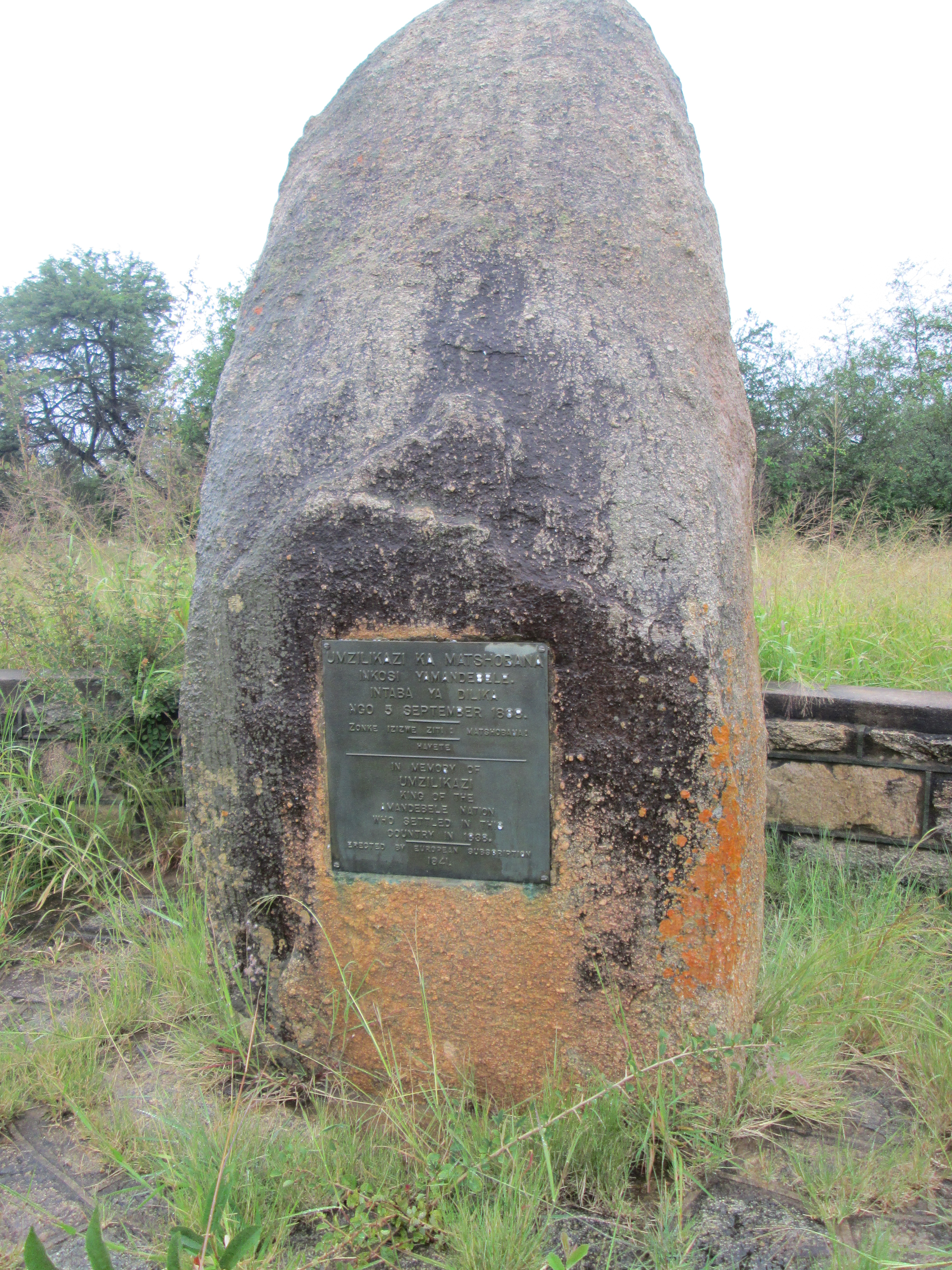
Mzilikazi's memorial

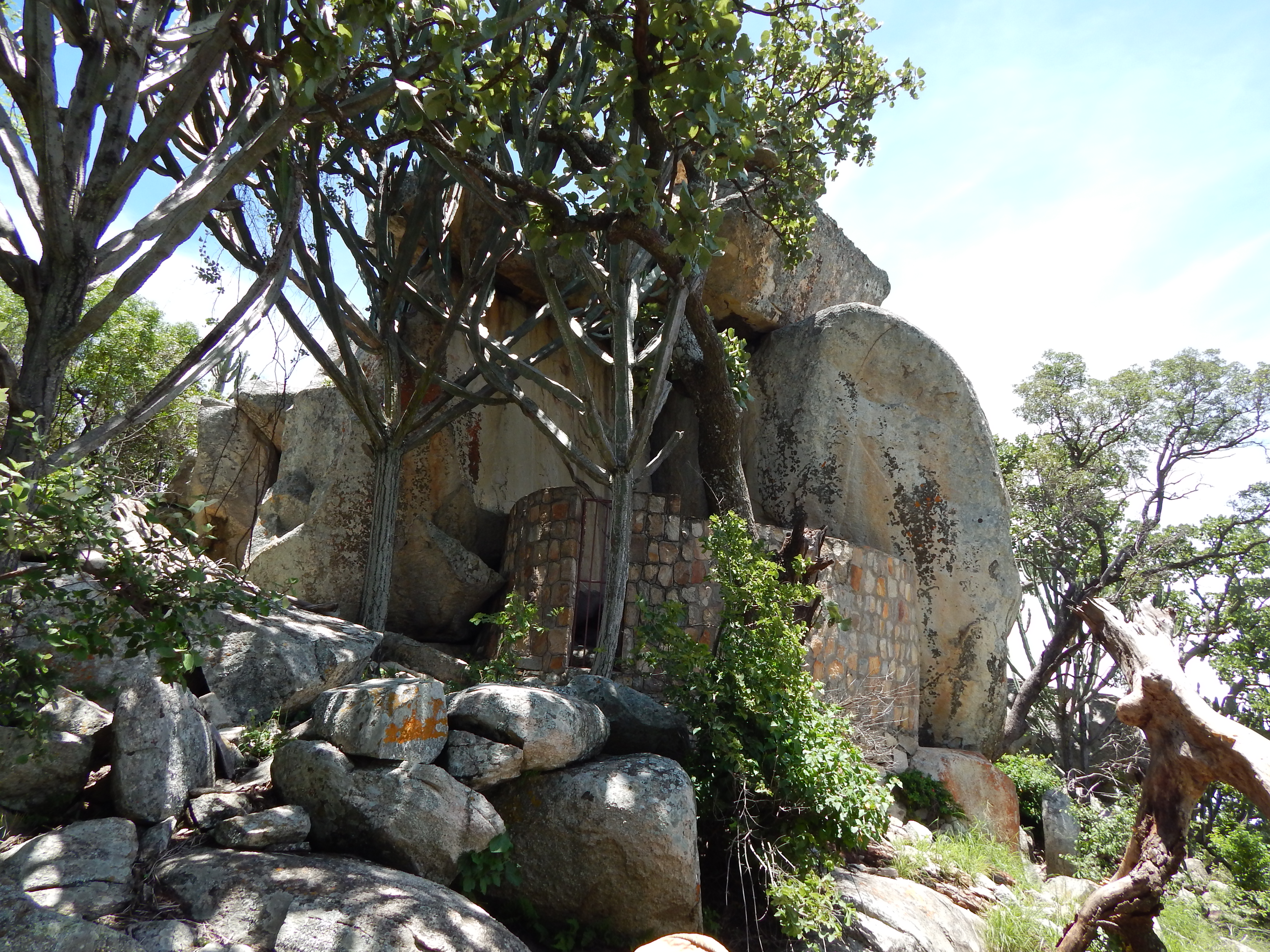
Mzilikazi's grave
