= Lozikeyi =

Lozikeyi Dlodlo
- Queen of Ndebele
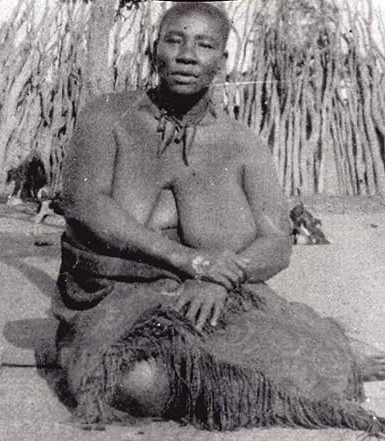
- Born: c. 1855
- Died: 1919

Lozikeyi Dlodlo (c. 1855-1919) was a queen regent of the Ndebele people in Southern Africa.

== Background ==
Lozikeyi was one of the favourite wives of Lobengula, and a senior queen, until 1893. She had no sons, only daughters, yet even so was influential in the attempt to have the son of a co-wife serve as her husband's successor. She was known for her outspokenness and for her defiance of the white settlers in what would later become Rhodesia. When her husband disappeared, she served for a time as de facto regent of the kingdom. Her place of retirement in the Bembezi River was an island which came to be known as the "Queen's Location". Lozikeyi died at Nkosikazi in Bubi District of influenza; her grave in the vicinity may still be visited, although its condition has been described as "neglected". Nearby is a school for which she lobbied and which she opened; it still serves students, although it has not been modernized. She was the subject of a biography, Lozikeyi Dlodlo Queen of the Ndebele: "A Very Dangerous and Intriguing Woman" by Marieke Faber Clarke and Pathisa Nyathi, published in 2013. Four photographs of her are in the collection of the Bodleian Library in Oxford, which featured her in an exhibit during the construction of a new wing.

== Queen of the Ndebele ==
Queen Lozikeyi took over leadership of the Ndebele nation due to the constitutional precedent among the Nguni people. Queen Lozikeyi was not the first woman to lead in this capacity. But rather was a part of a collection of strong influential royal woman in Nguni society. Queen Labotsibeni Mdluli was queen mother of Swaziland from 1889 to her death in 1919.

== Anglo-Matabele war of 1896 ==
Lozikeyi Dlodlo played an important role in the Anglo-Matabele war of 1896. She was in charge of the King's army. Together with her twin brother, Muntuwani, she ensured that the army had enough ammunition ahead of the 1896 war by using the weaponry her husband did not use in the first Anglo-Matabele war of 1893.
