= Northern Ndebele people =

Bantu ethnic group in Southern Africa

Ndebele
Total population
- 3,435,000 ~ (2023 estimate)

Regions with significant populations
- Zimbabwe: 2,200,000
- South Africa: ~ 800,000 - 1,000,000
- Botswana: 150,000
- United Kingdom: 60,000
- United States: 16,000-25,000
- Canada: ~10,000

Languages
- Northern Ndebele

Religion
- Predominantly Christianity; Minority Traditional African religion

Related ethnic groups
- Other Nguni people

Ndebele
- Person: iNdebele
- People: amaNdebele
- Language: isiNdebele
- Country: Matabeleland

The Northern Ndebele people (/ˌɛndəˈbɛli, -ˈbiːli, -leɪ/; EN-də-BE(E)L-ee, -ay; Northern Ndebele: amaNdebele) are an ethnic group native to Zimbabwe.

== Regional classification ==
The Northern Ndebele language spoken by the Ndebele people of Zimbabwe is generally similar to the isiZulu language spoken by the Zulu people of South Africa with a few pronunciation and word meaning differences. Northern Ndebele spoken in Zimbabwe and Southern Ndebele (or Transvaal Ndebele) spoken in South Africa are separate but related languages with some degree of mutual intelligibility, although the former is more closely related to Zulu. Southern Ndebele, while maintaining its Nguni roots, has been influenced by the Sotho languages.

== Etymology ==
The Northern Ndebele, specifically the Khumalo (amaNtungwa) people under Mzilikazi, were originally named Matebele in English. This name is common in older texts because it is the name the British first heard from the Sotho and Tswana peoples.

During the Mfecane in the early 19th century, the Ndebele invaded and settled territories previously populated by Sotho–Tswana peoples, who used the prefix ma- for collectives of people (compare to the Nguni prefix ama-). British explorers—who were first informed of the existence of the Northern Ndebele people by the Sotho–Tswana communities they encountered on their trip north—would have been presented with two variations of the name: the Sotho–Tswana pronunciation (Matebele) and the Ndebele pronunciation (Ndebele or amaNdebele). Under British rule, they were officially known as the Matebele. They are endogenously known as the Ndebele or amaNdebele.

== Early history ==
In the early nineteenth century, the Khumalos were caught between the Ndwandwe led by Zwide and the Zulus led by Shaka. To please the Ndwandwe tribe, the Khumalo chief Mashobane married the daughter of the Ndwandwe chief Zwide and sired a son, Mzilikazi. The Ndwandwes were closely related to the Zulus and spoke the same language, Nguni, using different dialects.

When Mashobane did not tell Zwide about patrolling Mthethwa amabutho (soldiers), Zwide had Mashobane killed. Thus his son, Mzilikazi, became the leader of the Khumalo. Mzilikazi immediately mistrusted his grandfather, Zwide. Shemane was Zwide's heir and he sought refuge with Sobhuza. and took soldiers to join Shaka. Shaka was overjoyed because the Khumalos would be helpful to spy on Zwide and the Ndwandwes. After a few battles, Shaka gave Mzilikazi the extraordinary honour of being chief of the Khumalos and remaining semi-independent from the Zulu, if Zwide could be defeated. This caused immense jealousy among Shaka's older allies, but as warriors, none was equal to Mzilikazi.

When Zwide was defeated, Shaka acknowledged Mzilikazi's essential contributions of intelligence. Shaka himself placed the plumes on Mzilikazi's head and presented him with one of two ivory axes, the other being kept by Shaka.

The Khumalos returned in peace to their ancestral homeland. This peace lasted until Shaka asked Mzilikazi to punish a tribe to the north of the Khumalo, belonging to Raninsi a Sotho. After defeating Raninsi, Mzilikazi refused to hand over the cattle and land to Shaka. The history of the Ndebele of Zimbabwe began through that refusal and attempt to create a rival nation. Mzilikazi and his allies continued on to raid and occupy the chiefdoms of the Sotho people and the Southern Ndebele, who had been significantly weakened by the Dutch–Afrikaner settlers (Boers) from the Cape Colonies.

This happened during a turbulent period of civil conflict in Nguni and Sotho–Tswana history, known as the Mfecane ("the crushing" or "the scattering"). Mzilikazi's regiments moved north-west to the present-day provinces of Gauteng, Mpumalanga, North West, and Limpopo. A skilled military and political tactician, Mzilikazi attacked or subjugated the local tribes he found along the way, including the Khoi, Batswana, Bapedi, and the Ndebeles of Mpumalanga. In their land, between 1827 and 1832, Mzilikazi built three military strongholds. The largest was Kungwini, situated at the foot of the Wonderboom Mountains on the Apies River, just north of present-day Pretoria. Another was Dinaneni, north of the Hartbeespoort Dam, while the third was Hlahlandlela in the territory of the Fokeng near Rustenburg.

Mzilikazi and his allies also conquered and occupied the BaHurutshe, whose capital, Mosega, became their military headquarters. They built military strongholds at Tshwenyane, the Marico River, and eGabeni (Kapain), where they also built a sizeable settlement. During the Great Trek of 1836–1838, voortrekkers (Boers) arrived in Transvaal and found Mzilikazi the king of the region, and a threat to their advancement. They fought with him, losing in the first battle. In the second battle in 1837, the Boers (led by Potgieter, Maritz, and Uys) launched another attack on Mzilikazi's military stronghold at eGabeni at dawn. In a nine-day battle, they destroyed eGabeni and other Matabele camps along the Marico River.

Mzilikazi—realizing that the Ndebele, like the Sotho, did not stand a chance against the Boers, who were heavily armed with guns and rifles—decided to retreat with his regiments and loyalists from the Marico Valley. He moved to present-day Matabeleland South where the amaNdebele people overwhelmed the indigenous Rozvi people and Kalanga people—who were already crumbling due to leadership squabbles after the death of Changamire Dombo—and eventually carved out a home. During the migration, numerous indigenous clans and individuals (such as the Southern Ndebele, Swazi, Sotho–Tswana, and Rozvi ethnic groups) were absorbed into the Ndebele tribe, adopting the Ndebele language and culture. When Europeans arrived in the area, they found Mzilikazi settled with his people. Thus, they called the area Matabeleland, which encompasses the west and southwest region of Zimbabwe.

== Ndebele kingdom (1823–1897) ==
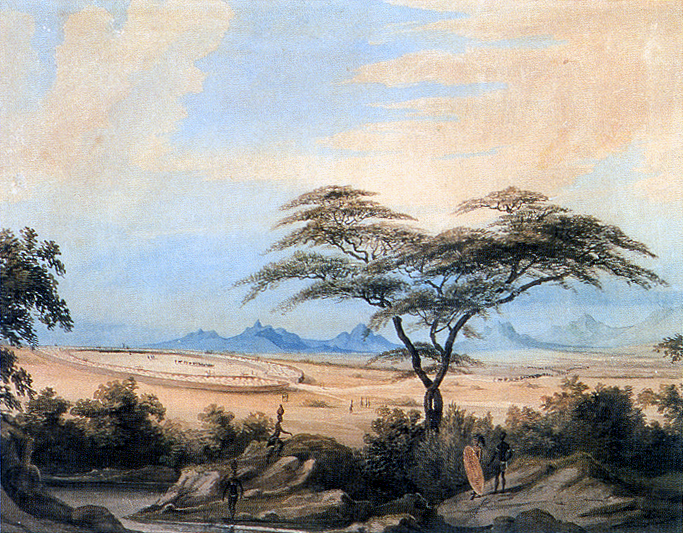
Matebele kraal, as depicted by William Cornwallis Harris (1836)

Mzilikazi who reigned from 1823, chose a new headquarters on the western edge of the central plateau of modern-day Zimbabwe, leading some 20,000 Ndebele, descendants of the Nguni and Sotho of South Africa. He had invaded the Rozvi state and raided some of the Rozvi people (mostly women); the rest became satellite farming communities and were forced to pay tribute to the Northern Ndebele kingdom.

Mzilikazi called his new nation Mthwakazi, a Zulu word which means 'something which became big at conception' (Zulu: into ethe ithwasa yabankulu). Europeans called the territory 'Matebeleland'. Mzilikazi organized this ethnically diverse nation into a militaristic system of regimental towns and established his capital at Bulawayo.

In 1852, the Boer government in Transvaal made a treaty with Mzilikazi. Mzilikazi died on 9 September 1868, near Bulawayo. His son, Lobengula, succeeded him as king. Lobengula established a state that held sovereignty over the region between the Limpopo and Zambezi rivers to the north and south and between the desert of the Makgadikgadi salt pans to the west and the Save River to the east.

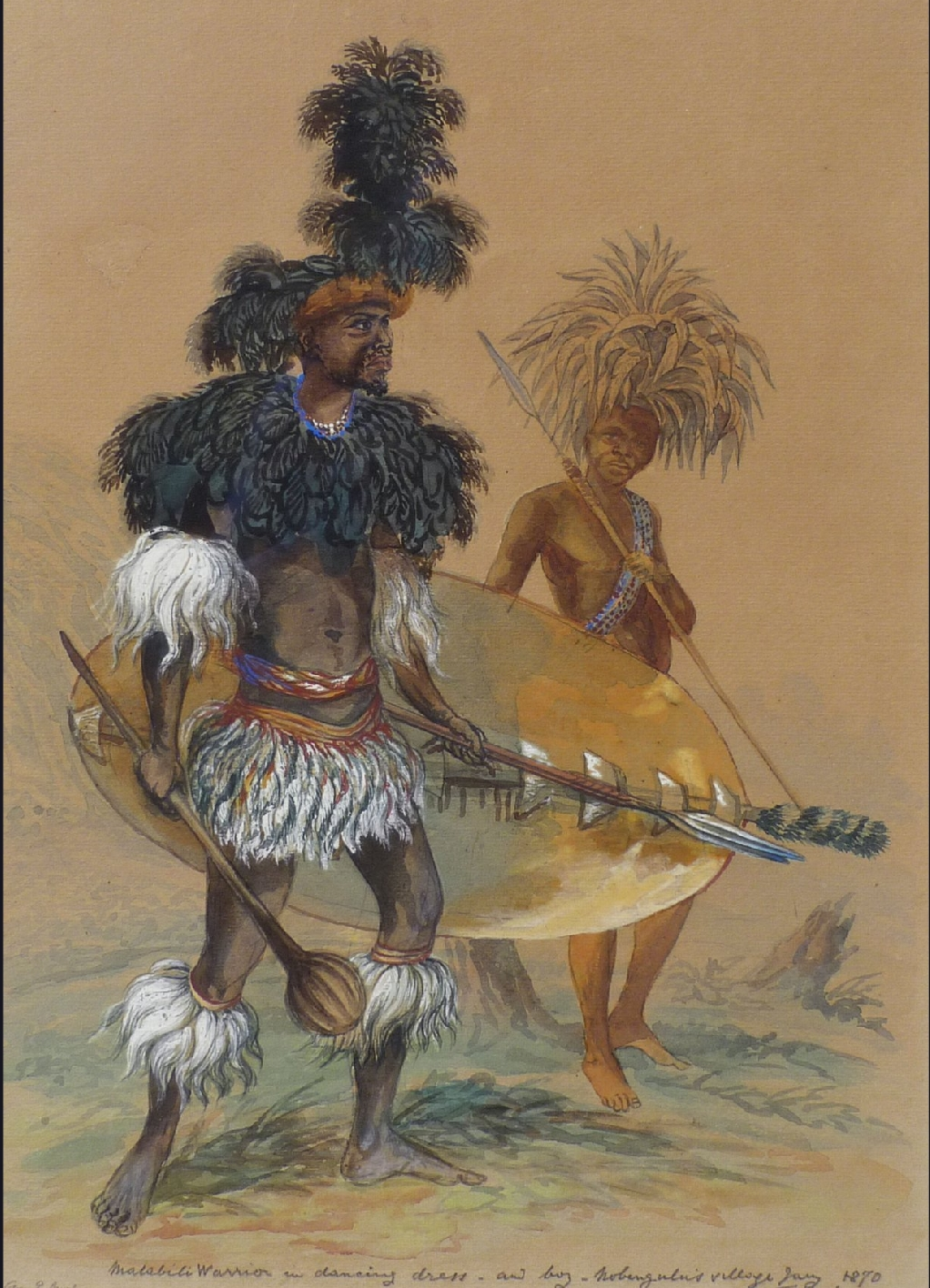
Matebele warrior in dancing dress, by Thomas Baines

In exchange for wealth and arms, Lobengula granted several concessions to the British, the most prominent of which was the 1888 Rudd Concession, which permitted British mining and colonisation of Zimbabwe and prohibited all Boer settlement in the country. This concession gave Cecil Rhodes exclusive mineral rights in much of the lands east of his main territory. As gold was already known to exist in that area, the concession enabled Rhodes to obtain a royal charter to form the British South Africa Company (BSAC) in 1889. As part of the agreement, BSAC would pay Lobengula 100 pounds a month, 1,000 rifles, 10,000 rounds of ammunition, and a riverboat. Lobengula had hoped that the Rudd Concession would diminish European incursions. However, as white settlers moved in, BSAC set up its government, made its laws, and set its sights on more mineral rights and territorial concessions.

The social organization of the Northern Ndebele language people was rigidly controlled by rules of service and hierarchy inherited from Shaka's reforms among the Zulu. Other subject peoples, such as in Mashonaland, were treated harshly; their lives and property were subject to the King's control and could be disrupted at any time by raids or exactions of tribute. This scene was presented to the British Pioneer Column when they arrived in Mashonaland in 1890.

=== First Matebele War ===
In August 1893, Lobengula sent warriors to Fort Victoria to raid cattle from the Shona people. Although Lobengula's armed warriors won, the British South Africa Company (BSAC) took the opportunity to attack Lobengula in the guise of protecting the Shona. During this confrontation, a fight broke out between BSAC and Matebele, beginning the First Matebele War. Hoping for a quick victory, Leander Starr Jameson sent his BSAC forces to attack the capital koBulawayo and capture Lobengula. Rather than fight, Lobengula burned down his capital and fled with a few of his elite warriors. The BSAC moved into the remains of koBulawayo, establishing a base, which they renamed KwaBulawayo, and then sent out patrols to find Lobengula. The most famous of these patrols, the Shangani Patrol, managed to find Lobengula, only to be trapped and wiped out in battle.

The British were vastly outnumbered throughout the war, but their superior armaments, most notably the Maxim gun, proved too much for the Ndebele. In an attempt to reach a peace accord with the British, a band of Lobengula's warriors brought a large sum of gold to two BSAC soldiers to be delivered to their superiors. The two soldiers instead decided to keep the gold for themselves, and the incident went undiscovered for many months. Lobengula chose to escape; he was last seen crossing the Shangani River.

=== Second Matebele War ===
In March 1896, the Matebele revolted against the authority of the BSAC in what is now celebrated in Mthwakazi as the First War of Independence. After a year of drought and cattle sickness, Mlimo, the Matebele spiritual leader, is credited with fomenting much of the anger that led to this confrontation. The Matebele retreated into their stronghold of the Matobo Hills near KwaBulawayo, which became the scene of the fiercest fighting against the white settler patrols, led by military figures such as Frederick Russell Burnham, Robert Baden-Powell, and Frederick Selous. Hundreds of white settlers and uncounted Matebele and Mashona were killed over the next year and a half. The Matebele military defiance ended only when Burnham found and assassinated Mlimo. Upon learning of Mlimo's death, Rhodes walked into the Matebele stronghold and persuaded the leaders to lay down their arms. This final uprising thus ended in October 1897; Matebeleland and Mashonaland were later renamed Rhodesia.

== Modern period ==
In 1963 a subset of the main rebel group, Zimbabwe African People's Union (ZAPU), split off and formed the Zimbabwe African National Union (ZANU). Though these groups had a common origin, they gradually grew apart, with ZANU mainly recruiting from the Shona regions and ZAPU mainly recruiting from Ndebele regions.

The Zimbabwe People's Revolutionary Army (ZIPRA) was a primarily-Ndebele anti-government force, led by Joshua Nkomo and ZAPU. ZIPRA trained and planned their missions in Zambian bases; however, this was not always with full Zambian government support. By 1979, the combination of the ZIPRA forces based in Zambia, the Umkhonto we Sizwe (the armed wing of the African National Congress of South Africa), and the South West Africa People's Organization (SWAPO) fighters was a major threat to Zambia's internal security. Because ZAPU's political strategy relied more heavily on negotiations than armed force, ZIPRA did not grow as quickly or elaborately as the Zimbabwe African National Liberation Army (ZANLA), but by 1979 it had an estimated 20,000 combatants, almost all based in camps around Lusaka, Zambia.

=== Gukurahundi ===
The Gukurahundi (Shona: "the early rain which washes away the chaff before the spring rains") refers to the civil suppression by Zimbabwe's 5th Brigade in the predominantly Ndebele-speaking region of Matabeleland, most of whom were supporters of Joshua Nkomo and ZAPU.

Robert Mugabe, then prime minister, had signed an agreement with North Korean President Kim Il Sung in October 1980 to have the North Korean military train a brigade for the Zimbabwean army. This was soon after Mugabe had announced the need for a militia to "combat malcontents." Mugabe replied by saying Matabeleland dissidents should "watch out", announcing the brigade would be called "Gukurahundi". This brigade was named the Fifth Brigade, and its members were drawn from 3,500 ex-ZANLA troops at Tongogara Assembly Point, named after Josiah Tongogara, the ZANLA general. The training of the Fifth Brigade lasted until September 1982, when Minister Sekeramayi announced training was complete.

The first commander of the Fifth Brigade was Colonel Perrance Shiri. The Fifth Brigade differed from all other Zimbabwean army units in that it was directly subordinate to the prime minister's office and not integrated into the regular army command structures. Their codes, uniforms, radios, and equipment were incompatible with other army units. Their most distinguishing feature in the field was their red berets.

After several ZIPRA forces in Lupane and Matopos refused their tools, the Fifth Brigade conducted public executions of ex-ZIPRA soldiers, families, and supporters in the Lupane, Tsholotsho, and Matobo districts. Victims were often forced to re-initiation camps, but those who refused were executed and buried in mass graves. The initial number of executed Ndebeles was 2,800 in 1987; however, some recent politicians estimate 20,000. The largest number of dead in a single killing occurred on 5 March 1983, when 62 young men were shot on the banks of the Cewale River, Lupane; seven survived with gunshot wounds, the other 55 died. The Fifth Brigade also killed large groups of people by burning them alive in huts, as they did in Tsholotsho and Lupane. They routinely rounded up dozens, or even hundreds, of civilians and marched them at gunpoint to a central place, such as a school or a borehole, where they would beat the civilians with sticks and force them to sing songs praising ZANU. These gatherings usually ended with public executions. Those killed included ex-ZIPRA guerrillas, ZAPU officials, and civilians perceived as dissidents

== Notable people ==
- Mthuli Ncube – Zimbabwean Finance Minister and politician
- Sibusiso Moyo – former Zimbabwean Foreign Minister and 2017 Zimbabwean coup d'état military leader
- Bulelani Khumalo – disputed and constitutionally unrecognised Ndebele King in Zimbabwe and in South Africa
- Trevor Ncube – Zimbabwean digital and print news content publisher
- Khayisa Nhlanhlayamangwe Ndiweni – Chief of the Matebele people of Ntabazinduna and Mbembezi (1939–2010)
- Nhlanhlayamangwe Felix Ndiweni – Chief of the Matebele people of Ntabazinduna and Mbembezi (2010–present) and politician
- Mimi. M Khayisa (Mimi Ndiweni) – actress
- Dumiso Dabengwa – politician
- Lovemore Majaivana – musician
- Lookout Masuku – leader of ZIPRA
- Alfred Nikita Mangena – first ZIPRA army commander
- Josiah Gumede – ceremonial president of Zimbabwe Rhodesia
- Mpumelelo Mbangwa – cricketer
- Jonathan Moyo – politician
- Busi Ncube – singer
- Pius Ncube – Archbishop of kwaBulawayo
- Welshman Ncube – politician
- Peter Ndlovu – footballer
- Mluleki Nkala – cricketer
- Joshua Nkomo – former Vice President of Zimbabwe and ZAPU leader
- Albert Nyathi – poet
- Gibson Sibanda – politician
- Jabulani Sibanda – politician
- Thenjiwe Lesabe – teacher, war hero, and political activist
- Cont Mhlanga – playwright, actor, and theatre director
- Sandra Ndebele – musician and politician
- Albert Nyathi – poet and musician
- Prince Dube – professional soccer player
- Tando Velaphi – professional soccer player
- Milton Ncube – professional soccer player
- Richard Hachiro – professional soccer player
