= Tati Concessions Land =

Land and mining concession in the Matabele Kingdom

The Tati Concession was a land and mining concession created in the western borderlands of the Matabele Kingdom. The concession was originally granted by the Matabele King, Lobengula, son of Mzilikazi, to Sir John Swinburne in exchange for gold and arms. It was administered by the territory known as the Bechuanaland Protectorate after 1893, but was formally annexed to it by Proclamation Number 2 of 1911 by the High Commissioner of Bechuanaland. It was locally administered by a Justice of the Peace.

The chief town of this region is Francistown, now one of Botswana's major settlements.

== Chronology ==
- 1864: Gold is discovered by Europeans in Tati River area (Tati Goldfields), then part of the Matabele kingdom.
- 1870: Concession granted to Sir John Swinburne's London and Limpopo Mining Company.
- 1880: The concession was revoked for failure to pay the annual fee, and the concession was granted instead to the Northern Light Mining Company, a syndicate formed by Danial Francis, Samuel Howard Edwards (1827–1922) and others. The Northern Light Company was later renamed the Tati Concessions, Ltd.
- 1893: Tati Land was detached from Matabeleland and placed under the jurisdiction of the British Resident Commissioner of the Bechuanaland Protectorate.
- 21 January 1911: Annexed to Bechuanaland (now Botswana) via the Tati Concessions Land Act, with a special agreement to preserve rights of access for Rhodesian Railways (now the National Railways of Zimbabwe).

== History ==
Tati Concessions Limited was formed by Sir John Swinburne after agreement was reached with Chief Lobengula, King of the Matabele, son of Mzilikaze, in which Lobengula and the Matabele received gold and arms, in exchange for rights to mine and occupy this area of land in Western Matabeleland. It was also given the right by the British Government to issue its own Revenue stamps in 1896 for use on legal instruments.

The company ran into financial difficulties in 1914 and sold much of its land to a successor company, Tati Company Limited, originally domiciled in the United Kingdom, now in Botswana.

Soon after independence, new owners of the Company agreed generous land deals with the Botswana Government under Sir Seretse Khama, in which all the undeveloped land in Francistown, and much of the Company's agricultural land was donated to Government, or sold for nominal value, for the benefit of the Batswana people, especially those with limited means. This led to bustling, modern-day Francistown. Those agreements were followed by a subsequent agreement, the acquisition by Government of the Company's mineral rights, for nominal value in 1974. All mineral rights are vested in Government, the norm throughout the country.

== Notes and references ==
Sources

- WorldStatesmen- Botswana
- States and Regents of the World: Bechuanaland
