= Northern Ndebele language =

Bantu language of Zimbabwe and Botswana

Northern Ndebele
- Mthwakazi Ndebele,
- isiNdebele
- Region: Limpopo in South Africa; Matabeleland South in Zimbabwe; North-East District in Botswana
- Ethnicity: Northern Ndebele
- Native speakers: 2.6 million (2023)
- Language family: Niger–Congo?: Atlantic–Congo; Volta-Congo; Benue–Congo; Bantoid; Southern Bantoid; Bantu; Southern Bantu; Nguni; Zunda; Northern Ndebele
- Writing system: Latin script

Official status
- Official language in: Zimbabwe

Language codes
- ISO 639-1: nd – North Ndebele
- ISO 639-2: nde – North Ndebele
- ISO 639-3: nde – North Ndebele
- Glottolog: nort2795
- Guthrie code: S.44
- Linguasphere: 99-AUT-fk incl. varieties 99-AUT-fka to 99-AUT-fkd

The Ndebele Language
- Person: iNdebele
- People: amaNdebele (prev. Matabele)
- Language: isiNdebele

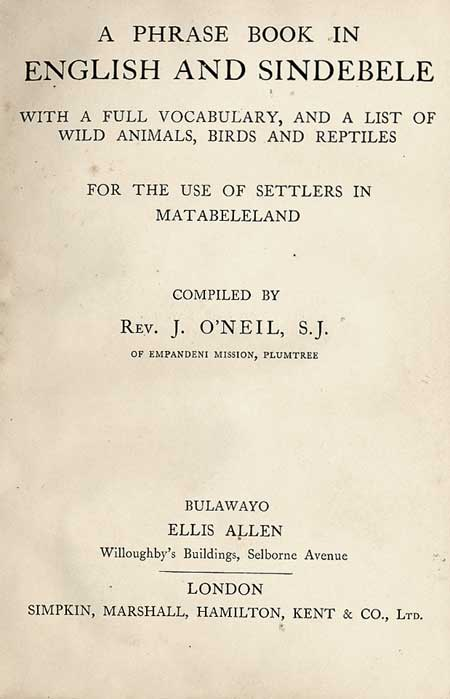
isiNdebele dictionary, 1910

Northern Ndebele (English: /əndəˈbeɪleɪ/), also called Ndebele, isiNdebele saseNyakatho, Zimbabwean Ndebele, isiNdebele or North Ndebele, associated with the term Matabele, is a Nguni language spoken by the Northern Ndebele people which belongs to the Nguni group of languages.

Ndebele is a term used to refer to a collection of many different African cultures in Zimbabwe. As a language, it is by no means similar to the Ndebele language spoken in kwaNdebele in South Africa although, like many Nguni dialects, some words will be shared. Many of the natives that were colonized by the Matabele were assimilated into Mzilikazi's kingdom and are an offshoot of the Zulu tribe. The Matebele people of Zimbabwe descend from the Zulu due to a Zulu leader Mzilikazi (one of Zulu King Shaka's generals), who left the Zulu Kingdom in the early 19th century, during the Mfecane, arriving in present-day Zimbabwe in 1839.

Although there are some differences in grammar, lexicon and intonation between Zulu and Northern Ndebele, the two languages share more than 85% of their lexicon. To prominent Nguni linguists like Anthony Trevor Cope and Cyril Nyembezi, Northern Ndebele is a dialect of Zulu. To others like Langa Khumalo, it is a language. Distinguishing between a language and a dialect for language varieties that are very similar is difficult, with the decision often being based not on objective linguistic criteria but on more subjective, often politicised considerations.

Northern Ndebele and Southern Ndebele (or Transvaal Ndebele), which is spoken in South Africa, are separate but related languages with some degree of mutual intelligibility, although the former is more closely related to Zulu. Southern Ndebele, while maintaining its Nguni roots, has been influenced by the Sotho languages.

== Phonology ==
=== Consonants ===
Northern Ndebele consonants
		Bilabial	Labio- dental	Dental/ alveolar		Post- alveolar/ Palatal	Velar	Glottal
		Bilabial	Labio- dental	central	lateral	Post- alveolar/ Palatal	Velar	Glottal
Nasal	plain	m ⟨m⟩		n ⟨n⟩		ɲ ⟨ny⟩	ŋ ⟨ngh⟩	
Nasal	depressed	mʱ ⟨m⟩		nʱ ⟨n⟩		ɲʱ ⟨ny⟩	ŋʱ ⟨ngh⟩	
Plosive	ejective	pʼ ⟨p⟩		tʼ ⟨t⟩			kʼ ⟨k⟩	
Plosive	voiced	b ⟨bh⟩		d ⟨d⟩			ɡ ⟨ɡ⟩	
Plosive	aspirated	pʰ ⟨ph⟩		tʰ ⟨th⟩			kʰ ⟨kh⟩	
Plosive	prenasalized	ᵐp ⟨mp⟩		ⁿt ⟨nt⟩			ᵑk ⟨nk⟩	
Plosive	prenasalized (vd.)	ᵐb ⟨mb⟩		ⁿd ⟨nd⟩			ᵑɡ ⟨ng⟩	
Affricate	ejective			tsʼ ⟨ts⟩		tʃʼ ⟨tj⟩	kxʼ ⟨kl⟩	
Affricate	aspirated			tsʰ ⟨tsh⟩		tʃʰ ⟨tjh⟩		
Affricate	voiced					dʒ ⟨j⟩		
Affricate	prenasalized ejective			ⁿtsʼ ⟨nts⟩		ᶮtʃʼ ⟨ntjh⟩	ᵑkxʼ ⟨nkl⟩	
Affricate	prenasalized voiced					ᶮdʒ ⟨nj⟩		
Fricative	plain		f ⟨f⟩	s ⟨s⟩	ɬ ⟨hl⟩	ʃ ⟨sh⟩		h ⟨h⟩
Fricative	voiced (depr.)	βʱ ⟨b⟩	vʱ ⟨v⟩	zʱ ⟨z⟩		ʒʱ ⟨zh⟩	(ɣʱ ⟨k⟩)	(ɦ ⟨h⟩)
Fricative	voiced (non-depr.)	β ⟨b⟩			ɮ ⟨dl⟩		(ɣ ⟨k⟩)	
Fricative	prenasalized		ᶬf ⟨mf⟩	ⁿs ⟨ns⟩	ⁿɬ ⟨nhl⟩			
Fricative	prenasalized (vd.)		ᶬv ⟨mv⟩	ⁿz ⟨nz⟩	ⁿɮ ⟨ndl⟩			
Sonorant	plain	w ⟨w⟩		r ⟨r⟩	l ⟨l⟩	j ⟨y⟩		
Sonorant	depressed	wʱ ⟨w⟩			lʱ ⟨l⟩	jʱ ⟨y⟩		

Many consonant sounds may result in depressed (or breathy) allophones. Alveolar consonants, t, d, and n, may have dentalized allophones of [t̪ʼ, d̪, n̪]. Consonants k and h can result in allophones of [ɣ, ɣʱ] and [ɦ].

Ndebele /t͡ʃ/ generally correspond to Zulu /ʃ/.

==== Click consonants ====
Northern Ndebele clicks
		Denti-alveolar	Post-alveolar	
		Denti-alveolar	central	lateral
Click	tenuis	kǀ ⟨c⟩	k! ⟨q⟩	kǁ ⟨x⟩
Click	aspirated	kǀʰ ⟨ch⟩	k!ʰ ⟨qh⟩	kǁʰ ⟨xh⟩
Click	depressed	ɡǀʱ ⟨gc⟩	ɡ!ʱ ⟨gq⟩	ɡǁʱ ⟨gx⟩
Click	nasalized	ŋǀ ⟨nc⟩	ŋ! ⟨nq⟩	ŋǁ ⟨nx⟩
Click	nasalized (depr.)	ŋǀʱ ⟨ngc⟩	ŋ!ʱ ⟨ngq⟩	ŋǁʱ ⟨ngx⟩

In Northern Ndebele, there are fifteen click consonants.

The five clicks spelled with a c [ǀ] are made by placing the tip of the tongue against the front upper teeth and gums, the centre of the tongue is depressed and the tip of the tongue is drawn backwards. The resulting sound is similar to the sound used in English to express annoyance. Some examples are cina (end), cela (ask).

The five clicks spelled with a q [!] are made by raising the back of the tongue to touch the soft palate and touching the gums with the sides and tip of the tongue. The centre of the tongue is depressed and the tip drawn quickly away from the gum. The resulting sound is like the "pop" heard when quickly removing the cork from a bottle. Some examples are qalisa (start), qeda (finish).

The five clicks spelled with a x [ǁ] are made by placing the tongue so that the back of the tongue touches the soft palate and the sides and tip of the tongue touch the gums. One side of the tongue is quickly withdrawn from the gums. Some examples are xoxa (discuss), ixoxo (frog).

=== Vowels ===
There are five vowel phonemes, written with the letters a, e, i, o, u.

- a is pronounced [a], approximately like a in father; e.g. abantwana (children)
- e is pronounced [ɛ] or [e], sometimes like e in bed; e.g. emoyeni (in the air)
- i is pronounced [i], like ee in see; e.g. siza (help)
- o is pronounced [ɔ] or [o], sometimes approximately like o in bone; e.g. okhokho (ancestors)
- u is pronounced [u], like oo in soon; e.g. umuntu (person)

== Examples ==
=== Months in Northern and Southern Ndebele ===
English	Northern Ndebele (Zimbabwe)	Southern Ndebele (South Africa)	Zulu (South Africa)
January	uZibandlela	uTjhirhweni	uMasingane
February	uNhlolanja	uMhlolanja	uNhlolanja
March	uMbimbitho	uNtaka	uNdasa
April	uMabasa	uSihlabantangana	UMbasa
May	uNkwenkwezi	uMrhayili	UNhlaba
June	uNhlangula	uMgwengweni	UNhlangulana
July	uNtulikazi	uVelabahlinze	uNtulikazi
August	uNcwabakazi	uRhoboyi	UNcwaba
September	uMpandula	uKhukhulamungu	uMandulo
October	uMfumfu	uSewula	uMfumfu
November	uLwezi	uSinyikhaba	uLwezi
December	uMpalakazi	uNobayeni	uZibandlela

=== Numbers in Northern Ndebele ===
English	Northern Ndebele
One	Kunye
Two	Kubili
Three	Kuthathu
Four	Kune
Five	Kuhlanu
Six	Isithupha
Seven	Isikhombisa
Eight	Sitshiyagalombili
Nine	Sitshiyagalolunye
Ten	Kulitshumi
Fifty	Amatshumi amahlanu
One hundred	Ikhulu
One thousand	Inkulungwane

=== Days of the week ===
English	Northern Ndebele
Monday	uMvulo
Tuesday	Olwesibili
Wednesday	Olwesithathu
Thursday	Olwesine
Friday	Olwesihlanu
Saturday	uMgqibelo
Sunday	iNsonto

== Grammar ==
=== Nouns ===
The Northern Ndebele noun consists of two essential parts, the prefix and the stem. Using the prefixes, nouns can be grouped into noun classes, which are numbered consecutively, to ease comparison with other Bantu languages.

The following table gives an overview of Northern Ndebele noun classes, arranged according to singular-plural pairs.

Class	Singular	Plural
1/2	um(u)-^{1}	aba-, abe-
1a/2a	u-	o-
3/4	um(u)-^{1}	imi-
5/6	i-, ili-	ama-
7/8	is(i)-	iz(i)-
9/10	iN-	iziN-
11/10	u-, ulu-	
14	ubu-, ub-, utsh-	
15	uku-	
17	uku-	

^{1} umu- replaces um- before monosyllabic stems, e. g. umuntu (person).

=== Verbs ===
Verbs are marked with the following prefixes in agreement with the noun class of the subject and the object:

Person/ Class	Subject marker	Object marker
1st sing.	ngi-	-ngi-
2nd sing.	u-	-wu-
1st plur.	si-	-si-
2nd plur.	li-	-li-
1	u-	-m(u)-
2	ba-	-ba-
3	u-	-m(u)-
4	i-	-yi-
5	li-	-li-
6	a-	-wa-
7	si-	-si-
8	zi-	-zi-
9	i-	-yi-
10	zi-	-zi-
11	lu-	-lu-
14	bu-	-bu-
15	ku-	-ku-
17	ku-	-ku-
reflexive		-zi-

While subject-verb agreement is obligatory, object marking is not, and only appears when the object is given in the discourse. The object marker attaches closer to the verb root when it occurs (with the following notations: A - augment vowel; 1 - class 1 nominal prefix, etc.; 1s - class 1 subject agreement, etc.; FUT - future; 1o - class 1 object marker, etc.):

U-Thabani u-za-yi-pheka i-nyama
A-1Thabani 1s-FUT-9o-cook A-9meat
"Thabani will cook the meat."

There is evidence from Zulu that object markers are an evolution of pronominal clitics to be agreement markers, which might also be the case for Northern Ndebele, given the linguistic similarity between the languages.

== See also ==
- Southern Ndebele language
- Sumayela Ndebele language
- Zulu language
- Provinces of Zimbabwe
- Matabeleland North
- Matabeleland South
- Bulawayo
