= Matabeleland =

Region of southwestern Zimbabwe

- Map of Zimbabwe with Matabeleland highlighted
- Coordinates: 17°50′S 31°3′E
- Country: Zimbabwe
- Founder: Ndebele people

Population (2,633,247)
  - Total: 130,899 square kilometres (50,540 sq mi)

Matabeleland is a region located in southwestern Zimbabwe that is divided into three provinces: Matabeleland North, Bulawayo, and Matabeleland South. These provinces are in the west and south-west of Zimbabwe, between the Limpopo and Zambezi rivers and are further separated from Midlands by the Shangani River in central Zimbabwe. The region is named after its inhabitants, the Ndebele people who were called "Amatabele" (people with long shields – Mzilikazi's group of people who were escaping the Mfecani wars). Other ethnic groups who inhabit parts of Matabeleland include the Tonga, Bakalanga, Venda, Nambya, Khoisan, Xhosa, Sotho, Tswana, and Tsonga.

The capital and largest city is Bulawayo. Other notable towns are Plumtree, Victoria Falls, Beitbridge, Lupane, Esigodini, Hwange Gwanda and Maphisa. The land is fertile but semi arid. This area has coal and gold deposits. Industries include gold and other mineral mines, and engineering. There has been a decline in the industries in this region as water is in short supply due to scarce rainfall. Promises by the government to draw water for the region through the Matabeleland Zambezi Water Project have not been fulfilled, resulting in continuing water shortages.

== History ==
=== Rozvi Empire ===
Around the 10th and 11th centuries, the Bantu-speaking Bakalanga/vakaranga arrived from the south and settled in Mapungubwe on the Limpopo and Shashi river valleys. Later they moved north to Great Zimbabwe. By the 15th century, the Bakalanga/vakaranga had established a strong empire at Khami under a powerful ruler called Dlembeu. This empire was split by the end of the 15th century and were later conquered by the Nguni people.

=== Ndebele Kingdom ===
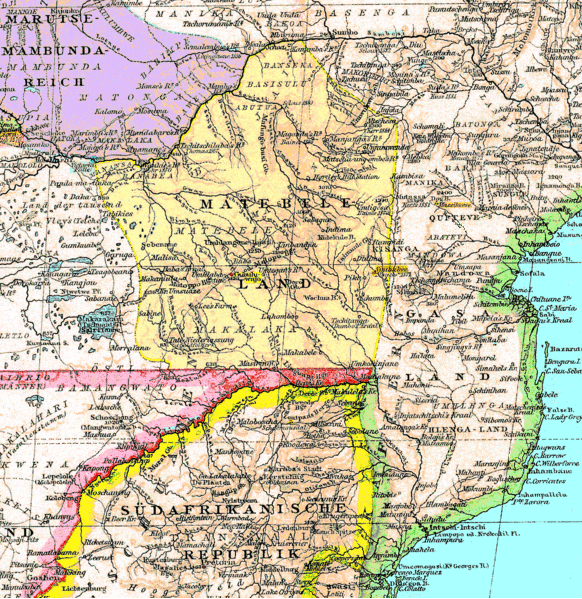
Matabeleland

In the late 1830s, Mzilikazi Khumalo, led a group of Nguni and other ethnic groups from present-day South Africa into the Rozvi Empire of the Bakalanga. Many of the Bakalanga people were incorporated to create a large state called Ndebele Kingdom. Mzilikazi, a former general under Shaka, organised this ethnically diverse nation into a militaristic system of regimental towns and established his capital at Bulawayo ("the place of killing"). Mzilikazi was a statesman of considerable stature, able to weld the many conquered tribes into a strong, centralised kingdom.

In 1840, Matabeleland was founded.

In 1852, the Boer government in the Transvaal made a treaty with Mzilikazi. Gold was discovered in northern Ndebele in 1867. The area, settled by the Zezuru people, remnants of the Mwenemutapa kingdom, while the European powers increasingly became interested in the region. Mzilikazi died on 9 September 1868, near Bulawayo. His son, Lobengula, succeeded him as king. In exchange for wealth and arms, Lobengula granted several concessions to the British, but it was not until twenty years later that the most prominent of these, the 1888 Rudd Concession gave Cecil Rhodes exclusive mineral rights in much of the lands east of Lobengula's main territory. Gold was already known to exist, but with the Rudd concession, Rhodes was able in 1889 to obtain a royal charter to form the British South Africa Company.

=== British South Africa Company ===
In 1890, Rhodes sent a group of settlers, known as the Pioneer Column, into Mashonaland where they founded Fort Salisbury (now Harare). In 1891 an Order-in-Council declared Matabeleland and Mashonaland British protectorates. Rhodes had a vested interest in the continued expansion of white settlements in the region, so now with the cover of a legal mandate, he used a brutal attack by Ndebele against the Shona near Fort Victoria (now Masvingo) in 1893 as a pretext for attacking the kingdom of Lobengula. Also in 1893, a concession awarded to Sir John Swinburne was detached from Matabeleland to be administered by the British Resident Commissioner of the Bechuanaland Protectorate, to which the territory was formally annexed in 1911 and it remains part of modern Botswana, known as the Tati Concessions Land.

=== First Matabele War ===
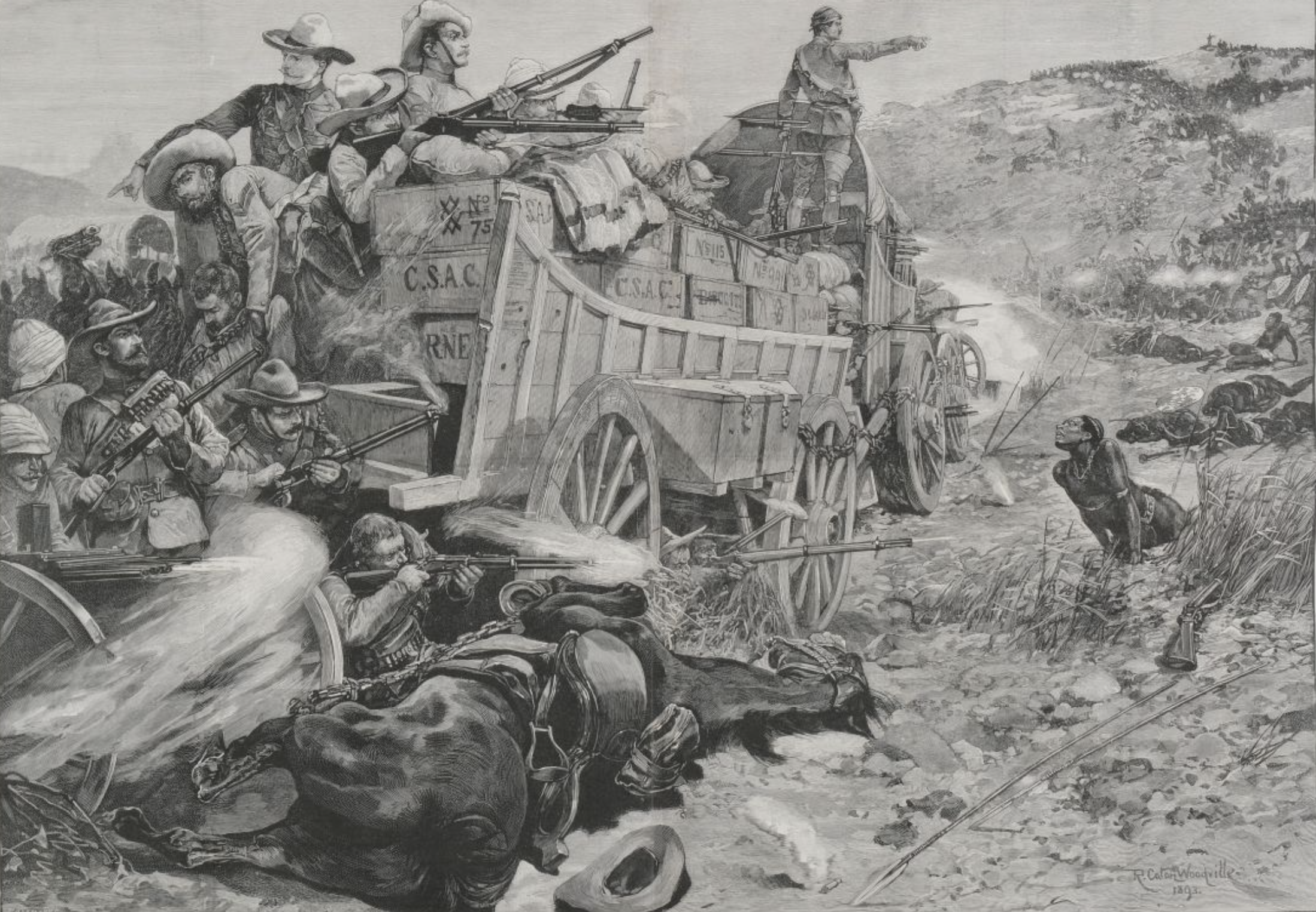
1893 illustration of the Battle of the Shangani by Richard Caton Woodville Jr.

The first decisive battle was fought on 1 November 1893, when a laager was attacked on open ground near the Bembesi River by Imbizo and Ingubo regiments. The laager consisted of 670 men of the British South Africa Police (BSAC), 400 of whom were mounted along with a small force of native allies, and fought off the Imbizo and Ingubo forces, which were considered by Sir John Willoughby to number 1,700 warriors in all. The laager had with it small artillery: 5 Maxim guns, 2 seven-pounders, 1 Gardner gun, and 1 Hotchkiss gun. The Maxim machine guns took center stage and decimated the native force at the Battle of the Shangani. Although Lobengula's forces totaled 8,000 spearmen and 2,000 riflemen, versus fewer than 700 BSAC troops, the Ndebele warriors were unable to counter modern weaponry. Leander Starr Jameson sent his troops to Bulawayo to try to capture Lobengula, but the king escaped and left Bulawayo in ruins behind him.

An attempt to bring the king and his forces to submit led to the disaster of the Shangani Patrol when a Ndebele Impi overwhelmed a British South Africa Company patrol led by Major Allan Wilson at the Shangani river in December 1893. Except for Frederick Russell Burnham and two other scouts sent for reinforcements, the detachment was surrounded and wiped out. This incident had a lasting influence on Matabeleland nationalism and spirit of resistance and the colonists who died in this battle are buried at Matobo Hills along with Jameson and Cecil Rhodes. In white Rhodesian history, Wilson's battle takes on the status of General Custer's stand at Little Big Horn in the United States. The Matabele fighters honoured the dead men with a salute to their bravery in battle and reportedly told the king, "They were men of men and their fathers were men before them." Lobengula died in January 1894, under mysterious circumstances; within a few short months the British South Africa Company controlled Matabeleland, and white settlers continued to arrive.

=== Second Matebele War ===
In March 1896, the Ndebele revolted against the authority of the British South Africa Company in what is now celebrated in Zimbabwe as the First Chimurenga, i.e., First War of Independence. Mlimo, the Ndebele spiritual/religious leader, is credited with fomenting much of the anger that led to this confrontation. He convinced the Ndebele that the white settlers (almost 4,000 strong by then) were responsible for the drought, locust plagues and the cattle disease rinderpest ravaging the country at the time.

Mlimo's call to battle was well-timed. Only a few months earlier, the BSAC's Administrator General for Matabeleland, Jameson, had sent most of his troops and armaments to attack the Transvaal Republic in the ill-fated Jameson Raid. This left the colony's security in disarray. In June 1896, the Shona too joined the war, but they stayed mostly on the defensive. The BRSAC immediately sent troops to suppress the uprising, but it took several months and cost hundreds of lives before the territory would be once again be at peace. Shortly after learning of the assassination of Mlimo at the hands of the American scout Frederick Russell Burnham, Cecil Rhodes walked unarmed into the Ndebele stronghold in Matobo Hills and persuaded the impi to lay down their arms, thus bringing the war to a close in October 1896. Matabeleland and Mashonaland would continue on only as provinces of the larger state of Rhodesia.

=== Birthplace of Scouting ===
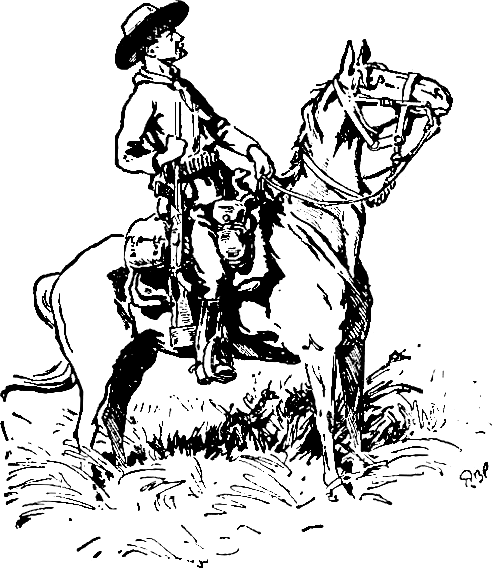
Baden-Powell's sketch of Chief of Scouts Burnham, Matobo Hills, 1896.

It was in Matabeleland during the Second Matabele War that Robert Baden-Powell, who later became the founder of the Scout Movement, and the younger Frederick Russell Burnham, the American born Chief of Scouts for the British Army, first met and began their lifelong friendship. Baden-Powell had already, in 1884, published a book called "Reconnaissance and Scouting". In mid-June 1896, while scouting in the Matobo Hills, Burnham passed on to Baden-Powell aspects of woodcraft he had acquired in America, and it was during this time with Burnham that perhaps the seeds were sown for the program and the code of honour eventually crystallised in Baden-Powell's 1899 "Aids to Scouting for NCOs and Men" and his later (1908) "Scouting for Boys", which was written after his experience of how useful and reliable the boys at Mafeking had been. Practiced by frontiersmen of the American Old West and Indigenous peoples of the Americas, woodcraft was generally unknown to the British. These skills eventually formed the basis of what is now called scoutcraft, the fundamentals of Scouting. Baden-Powell recognised that wars in Africa were changing markedly and the British Army needed to adapt; so during their joint scouting missions, Baden-Powell and Burnham discussed the concept of a broad training programme in woodcraft for young men, rich in exploration, tracking, fieldcraft, and self-reliance. It was also during these scouting missions in the Matobo Hills that Baden-Powell first started to wear his signature campaign hat like the one worn by Burnham. Later, Baden-Powell wrote a number of books on Scouting, and even started to train and make use of adolescent boys, most famously during the Siege of Mafeking, during the Second Boer War.

=== British Rule ===
British settlement of Rhodesia continued, and by October 1923, the territory of Southern Rhodesia was annexed to the Crown. The Ndebele thereby became British subjects and the colony received its first basic constitution and first parliamentary election. Ten years later, the British South Africa Company ceded its mineral rights to the territory's government for £2 million. The deep recession of the 1930s gave way to a post-war boom of British immigration.

After the onset of self-government, a major issue in Southern Rhodesia was the relationship between the white settlers and the Ndebele and Shona populations. One major consequence was the white settlers were able to enact discriminatory legislation concerning land tenure. The Land Apportionment and Tenure Acts reserved 45% of the land area for exclusively white ownership. 25% was designated "Tribal Trust Land", which was available to be worked on a collective basis by the already settled farmers and where individual title was not offered.

In 1965, the white government of Rhodesia, led by Prime Minister Ian Smith, unilaterally declared independence from Britain – only the second state to do so, the other being the United States in 1776. Initially, the state proclaimed its loyalty to Queen Elizabeth II as "Queen of Rhodesia" (a title to which she never consented), but by 1970 even that link was severed, and Rhodesia claimed to be an independent republic. This was not recognised by any other state in the world; legally, Rhodesia remained a British colony.

=== Sovereign Rhodesia ===
The ruling white Rhodesian government did not gain international recognition and faced serious economic problems as a result of sanctions. Some states, such as South Africa and Portugal, did support the white minority government of Rhodesia. In 1967, the Zimbabwe African People's Union began a lengthy armed campaign against Rhodesia's white minority government in what became known as the "Bush War" by White Rhodesians and as the "Second Umvukela" (or rebellion in Ndebele language) by supporters of the rebels. The Shona, backed by China, set up a separate war front from neighbouring Mozambique.

The Rhodesian government agreed to a ceasefire in 1979. For a brief period, Rhodesia reverted to the status of British colony, until early 1980 when elections were held. The ZANU party, led by the Shona independence leader Robert Mugabe, defeated the popular Ndebele candidate Joshua Nkomo, solidified their rule over independent Zimbabwe. The former state of Matabeleland and Mashonaland now exist as provinces of Zimbabwe.

=== Zimbabwe ===
Following independence in 1980, Zimbabwe initially made significant economic and social progress,

=== Gukurahundi Massacre 1983-1987 ===
Gukurahundi was a series of massacres of people inhabiting areas largely populated by Northern Ndebele people (formerly known as Matabele). They are said to have been carried out by some military elements mainly alleged to be a now disbanded fifth brigade, a paramilitary force that was trained in North Korea, from early 1983 to late 1987. The International Association of Genocide Scholars estimates that more than 20,000 people were killed and have classified the massacres as a genocide. The government has repeatedly destroyed local plaques commemorating the massacres.

By early 1984, these military elements are alleged to have disrupted food supplies in the Matabeleland regions where some inhabitants in the affected areas suffered food shortages. Robert Mugabe and Joshua Nkomo finally reconciled their political differences by late 1987. The roots of discord remained, however, and in some ways increased as Mugabe's rule became increasingly autocratic into the 21st century.

In the early 1990s, a Land Acquisition Act was passed, calling for the Mugabe government to purchase mostly white-owned commercial farming land for redistribution to native Africans. Greater Matabeleland has rich central plains, watered by tributaries of the Zambezi and Limpopo rivers, allowing it to sustain cattle and consistently produce large amounts of cotton and maize. But land grabbing, squatting, and repossessions of large commercial farms under Mugabe's program resulted in a 90% loss in productivity in large-scale farming, ever higher unemployment, and hyperinflation.

== See also ==
- ZAPU
- Kalanga
- Gwanda
- Matopos
- Hwange
- Victoria Falls
- Bulawayo
- Joshua Nkomo
- Matabeleland football team
