= Battle of the Shangani =

1893 battle in Zimbabwe

- Part of the First Matabele War
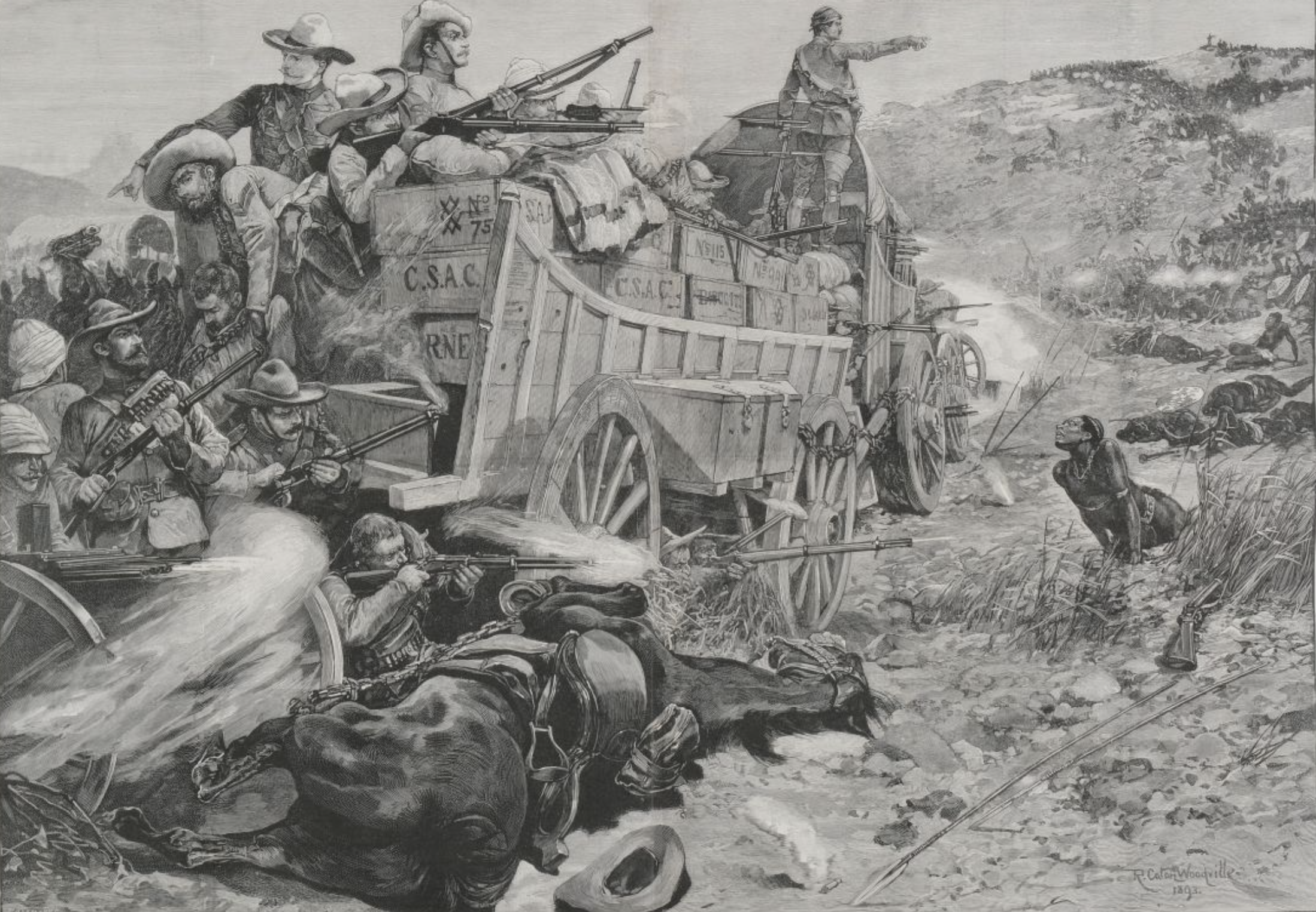
- Attack on the Laager of Wagons; Richard Caton Woodville Jr., 1893
| Date | 25 October 1893 |
| Location | Shangani River |
| Result | British victory |

Belligerents
| British South Africa Company | Mthwakazi |

Commanders and leaders
| Patrick William Forbes | Manonda †; Mjaan |

Strength
| 700; 5 Maxim guns 3 other rapid-fire guns 2 cannons | 5,000 |

Casualties and losses
| 4 killed | 1,500 killed |

The Battle of the Shangani took place on 25 October 1893 during the First Matabele War in what is now Zimbabwe. A British South Africa Company column led by Major Patrick William Forbes was attacked during night by a large force of Ndebele Kingdom warriors. Equipped with superior weaponry, the column, consisting of British South Africa Police troopers and African auxiliaries, repulsed them with a heavy loss of life to the Ndebele force. The battle is noted for being the first battle in which the Maxim gun played an important role.

== Background ==
The heads of the British South Africa Company (BSAC), Cecil Rhodes and Leander Starr Jameson, decided to respond to a Ndebele Kingdom raid with force. A BSAC column commanded by Major Patrick William Forbes was sent into Matabeleland. The force was made up of around seven-hundred men of the paramilitary British South Africa Police (BSAP) along with an unknown number of African auxiliaries. In addition to rifles, the column was equipped with five Maxim guns, three other rapid-fire guns, two cannon and 200 rifles. It advanced towards Bulawayo, the territory's capital.

== Battle ==
Ndebele king Lobengula planned a surprise attack at night. The BSAC column set up camp at the Shangani river, forming into a circular defensive laager on the model pioneered by the Boers. Lobengula's generals Manonda and Mjaan launched the attack with 5–6,000 warriors. However, BSAC sentries soon alerted the soldiers. According to trooper Jack Carruthers the attack came at 2:15 a.m., "a peaceful night, clear sky but on the dark side. The bugles gave the alarm, the camp was all excitement in a moment, all noise with the opening of ammunition boxes and shouting of officers, the men were getting into their places... the scouts had hardly time to save themselves. The outer sentries also had narrow escapes getting back into laager."

Lobengula's troops were a disciplined force by pre-colonial African standards, and were equipped with both assegais and Martini Henry rifles, but the BSAC trooper's Maxim guns, which had never before been used in battle, far exceeded expectations, according to an eyewitness "mow[ing] them down literally like grass". By the time the Ndebele withdrew, they had suffered around 1,500 fatalities; the BSAP, on the other hand, had lost only four men. The devastating effectiveness of the Maxims was such that they cut down wave after wave of advancing Ndebele warriors. Hubert Hervey, one of the BSAP troopers, commented that the Ndebele were not able to make good use of their own weapons: "the Matabele firing was very inaccurate and poor, and did hardly any damage."

The defeated Ndebele left the battlefield, while their leader Manonda committed suicide by hanging himself. According to Carruthers, he was not alone, "The Matebele retreated at daylight; several had hung themselves to trees with their girdles rather than return beaten. One in desperation, it seemed, had fallen on his own assegai."

== Aftermath ==
The battle proved the effectiveness of the Maxim machine gun, which was to become central to later colonial battles. Cecil Rhodes, writing to Sir Gordon Sprigg, said that "the shooting must have been excellent. . . . It proves the [Police] men were not only brave, but cool, and did not lose their heads, though surrounded with the hordes." A week later, on 1 November, 2,000 Ndebele riflemen and 4,000 warriors attacked Forbes at Bembezi, about 30 miles (48 km) north-east of Bulawayo, but again they were no match for the crushing firepower of the major's Maxims: about 2,500 more Ndebele were killed.
