= Colonial Africa =

Colonial history of the African continent

The colonial history of Africa spans from colonial period until the postcolonial period in the history of Africa.

== Southern Africa ==
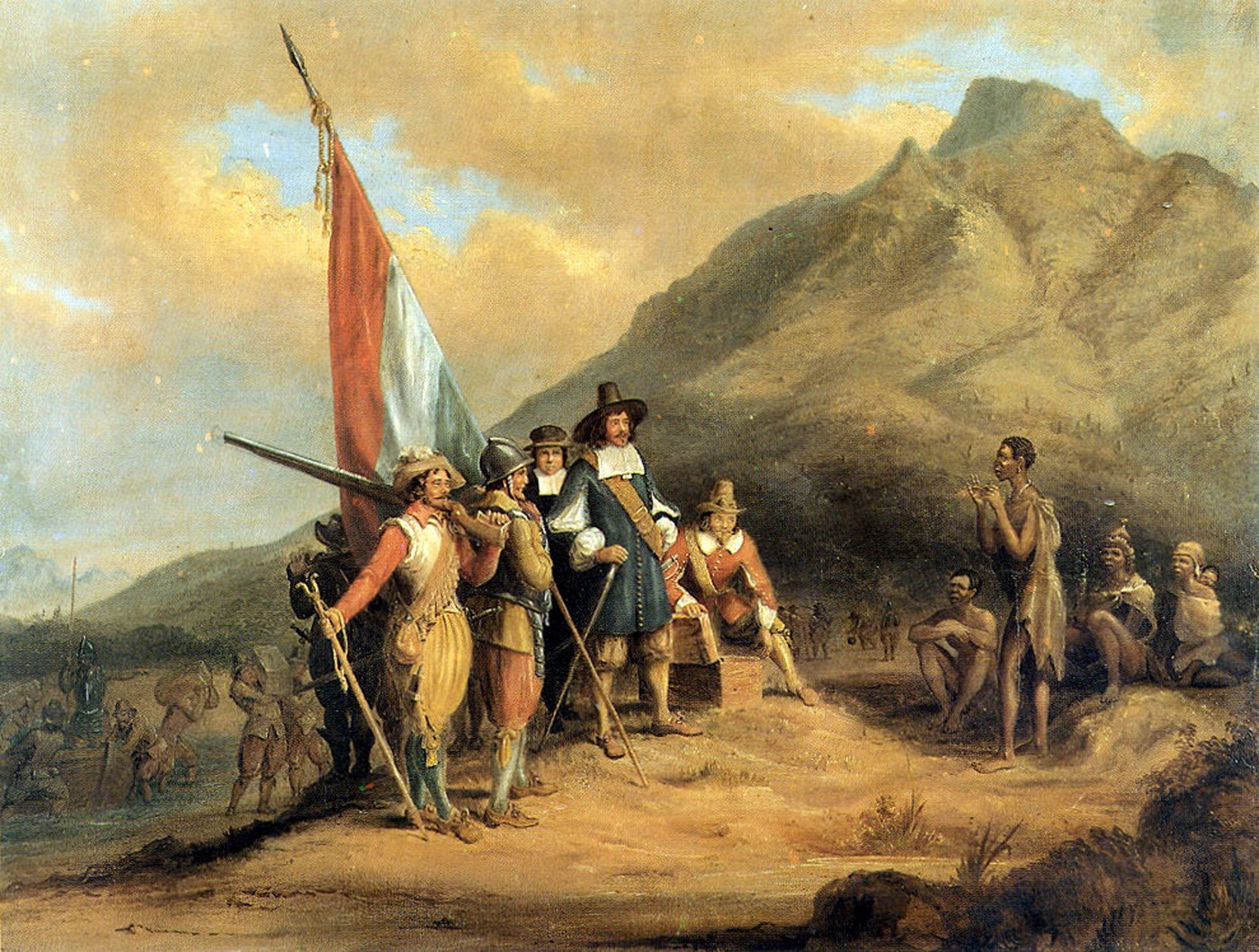
Painting depicting the arrival of Dutch settlers under Jan van Riebeeck at the Cape of Good Hope, 1652

By the 1850s, British and German missionaries and traders had penetrated present-day Namibia. The Herero and Nama peoples competed for guns and ammunition, providing cattle, ivory, and ostrich feathers. The Germans were more firmly established than the British in the region. By 1884, the Germans declared the coastal region from the Orange River to the Kunene River a German protectorate, part of German South West Africa. They pursued an aggressive policy of land expansion for white settlements. They exploited rivalry between the Nama and Herero.

The Herero entered into an alliance with the Germans, thinking they could get an upper hand on the Nama. The Germans set up a garrison at the Herero capital and started allocating Herero land for white settlements, including the best grazing land in the central plateau, and made tax and labor demands. The Herero and Ovambanderu rebelled, but the rebellion was crushed and leaders were executed. Between 1896 and 1897, rinderpest impaired the Herero and Nama economy and slowed white expansion. The Germans continued the policy of making Namibia a white settlement by seizing land and cattle, and even trying to export Herero labor to South Africa.

In 1904, the Herero rebelled again. German General Lothar von Trotha implemented an extermination policy at the Battle of Waterberg, which drove the Herero west of the Kalahari Desert. At the end of 1905, only 16,000 Herero were alive, out of a previous population of 80,000. Nama resistance was crushed in 1907. All Nama and Herero cattle and land were confiscated from the very diminished population, with remaining Nama and Herero assuming a subordinate position. Labor had to be imported from among the Ovambo.

== Nguniland ==
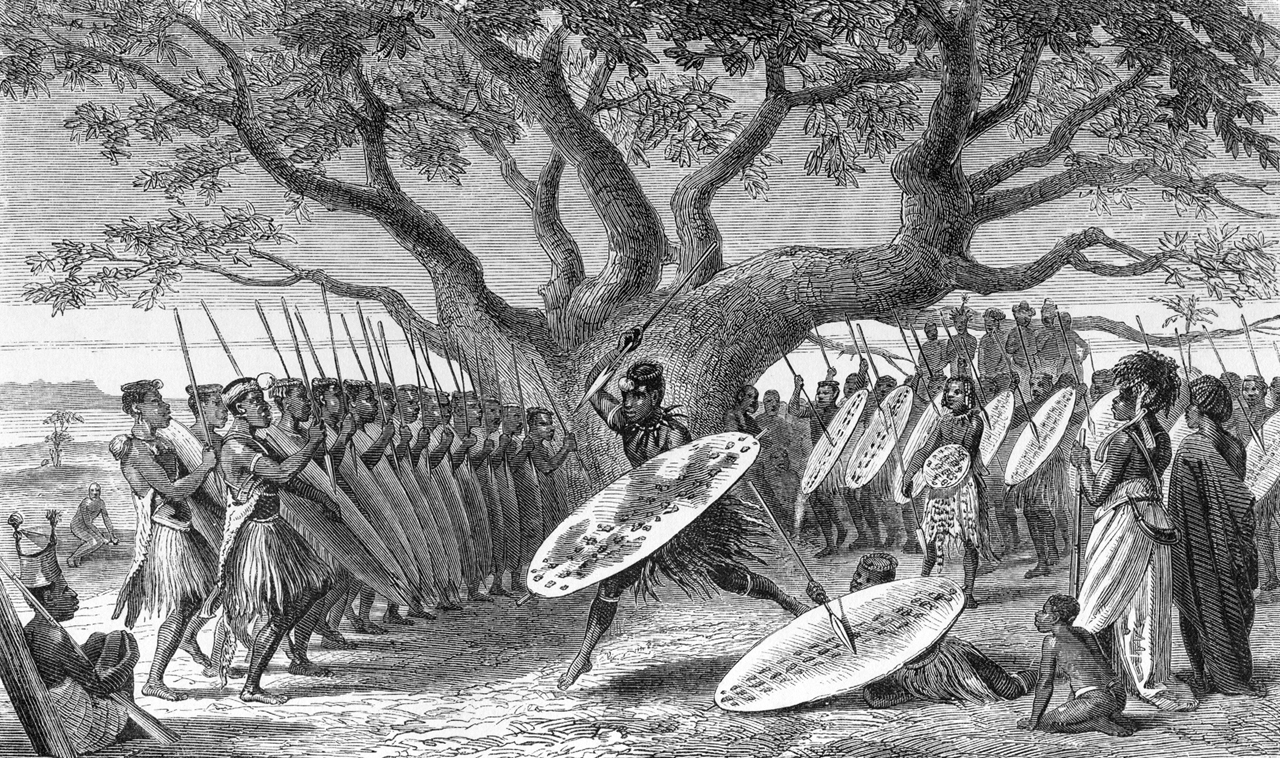
Zulu warriors

A moment of great disorder in southern Africa was the Mfecane, "the crushing." It was started by the northern Nguni kingdoms of Mthethwa, Ndwandwe, and Swaziland over scarce resource and famine. When Dingiswayo of Mthethwa died, Shaka of the Zulu people took over. He established the Zulu Kingdom, asserting authority over the Ndwandwe and pushing the Swazi north. The scattering Ndwandwe and Swazi caused the Mfecane to spread. During the 1820s, Shaka expanded the empire all along the Drakensberg foothills, with tribute being paid as far south as the Tugela and Umzimkulu rivers. He replaced the chiefs of conquered polities with indunas, responsible to him. He introduced a centralized, dedicated, and disciplined military force not seen in the region, with a new weapon in the short stabbing-spear.

In 1828, Shaka was assassinated by his half brother Dingane, who lacked the military genius and leadership skills of Shaka. Voortrekkers tried to occupy Zulu land in 1838. In the early months they were defeated, but the survivors regrouped at the Ncome River and soundly defeated the Zulu. However, the Voortrekkers dared not settle Zulu land. Dingane was killed in 1840 during a civil war. His brother Mpande took over and strengthened Zulu territories to the north. In 1879 the Zulu Kingdom was invaded by Britain in a quest to control all of South Africa. The Zulu Kingdom was victorious at the Battle of Isandlwana but was defeated at the Battle of Ulundi.

One of the major states to emerge from the Mfecane was the Sotho Kingdom founded at Thaba Bosiu by Moshoeshoe I around 1821 to 1822. It was a confederation of different polities that accepted the absolute authority of Moshoeshoe. During the 1830s, the kingdom invited missionaries as a strategic means of acquiring guns and horses from the Cape. The Orange Free State slowly diminished the kingdom but never completely defeated it. In 1868, Moshoeshoe asked that the Sotho Kingdom be annexed by Britain, to save the remnant. It became the British protectorate of Basutoland.

== Sotho-Tswana ==
The arrival of the ancestors of the Tswana-speakers who came to control the region (from the Vaal River to Botswana) has yet to be dated precisely although AD 600 seems to be a consensus estimate. This massive cattle-raising complex prospered until 1300 AD or so. All these various peoples were connected to trade routes that ran via the Limpopo River to the Indian Ocean, and trade goods from Asia such as beads made their way to Botswana most likely in exchange for ivory, gold, and rhinoceros horn. The first written records relating to modern-day Botswana appear in 1824. What these records show is that the Bangwaketse had become the predominant power in the region. Under the rule of Makaba II, the Bangwaketse kept vast herds of cattle in well-protected desert areas, and used their military prowess to raid their neighbours. Other chiefdoms in the area, by this time, had capitals of 10,000 or so and were fairly prosperous. This equilibrium came to end during the Mfecane period, 1823–1843, when a succession of invading peoples from South Africa entered the country. Although the Bangwaketse were able to defeat the invading Bakololo in 1826, over time all the major chiefdoms in Botswana were attacked, weakened, and impoverished. The Bakololo and Amandebele raided repeatedly, and took large numbers of cattle, women, and children from the Batswana—most of whom were driven into the desert or sanctuary areas such as hilltops and caves. Only after 1843, when the Amandebele moved into western Zimbabwe, did this threat subside.During the 1840s and 1850s trade with Cape Colony-based merchants opened up and enabled the Batswana chiefdoms to rebuild. The Bakwena, Bangwaketse, Bangwato and Batawana cooperated to control the lucrative ivory trade, and then used the proceeds to import horses and guns, which in turn enabled them to establish control over what is now Botswana. This process was largely complete by 1880, and thus the Bushmen, the Bakalanga, the Bakgalagadi, the Batswapong and other current minorities were subjugated by the Batswana. Following the Great Trek, Afrikaners from the Cape Colony established themselves on the borders of Botswana in the Transvaal. In 1852 a coalition of Tswana chiefdoms led by Sechele I resisted Afrikaner incursions, and after about eight years of intermittent tensions and hostilities, eventually came to a peace agreement in Potchefstroom in 1860. From that point on, the modern-day border between South Africa and Botswana was agreed on, and the Afrikaners and Batswana traded and worked together peacefully. In the 1820s, refugees from the Zulu expansion under Shaka came into contact with the Basotho people residing on the highveld. In 1823, those pressures caused one group of Basotho, the Kololo, to migrate north, past the Okavango Swamp and across the Zambezi into Barotseland, now part of Zambia. In 1845, the Kololo conquered Barotseland.

At about the same time, the Boers began to encroach upon Basotho territory. After the Cape Colony had been ceded to Britain at the conclusion of the Napoleonic Wars, the voortrekkers ("pioneers") were farmers who opted to leave the former Dutch colony and moved inland where they eventually established independent polities.

At the time of these developments, Moshoeshoe I gained control of the Basotho kingdoms of the southern Highveld. Universally praised as a skilled diplomat and strategist, he was able to wield the disparate refugee groups escaping the Difaqane into a cohesive nation. His inspired leadership helped his small nation to survive the dangers and pitfalls (the Zulu hegemony, the inward expansion of the voortrekkers and the designs of imperial Britain) that destroyed other indigenous South African kingdoms during the 19th century.

In 1822, Moshoeshoe established his capital at Butha-Buthe, an easily defensible mountain in the northern Drakensberg mountains, laying the foundations of the eventual Kingdom of Lesotho. His capital was later moved to Thaba Bosiu.

To deal with the encroaching voortrekker groups, Moshoeshoe encouraged French missionary activity in his kingdom. Missionaries sent by the Paris Evangelical Missionary Society provided the King with foreign affairs counsel and helped to facilitate the purchase of modern weapons.

Aside from acting as state ministers, missionaries (primarily Casalis and Arbousset) played a vital role in delineating Sesotho orthography and printing Sesotho language materials between 1837 and 1855. The first Sesotho translation of the Bible appeared in 1878.

In 1868, after losing the western lowlands to the Boers during the Free State–Basotho Wars; Moshoeshoe successfully appealed to Queen Victoria to proclaim Lesotho (then known as Basutoland) a protectorate of Britain and the British administration was placed in Maseru, the site of Lesotho's current capital. Local chieftains retained power over internal affairs while Britain was responsible for foreign affairs and the defence of the protectorate. In 1869, the British sponsored a process by which the borders of Basutoland were finally demarcated. While many clans had territory within Basutoland, large numbers of Sesotho speakers resided in areas allocated to the Orange Free State, the sovereign voortrekker republic that bordered the Basotho kingdom.

== Voortrekkers ==
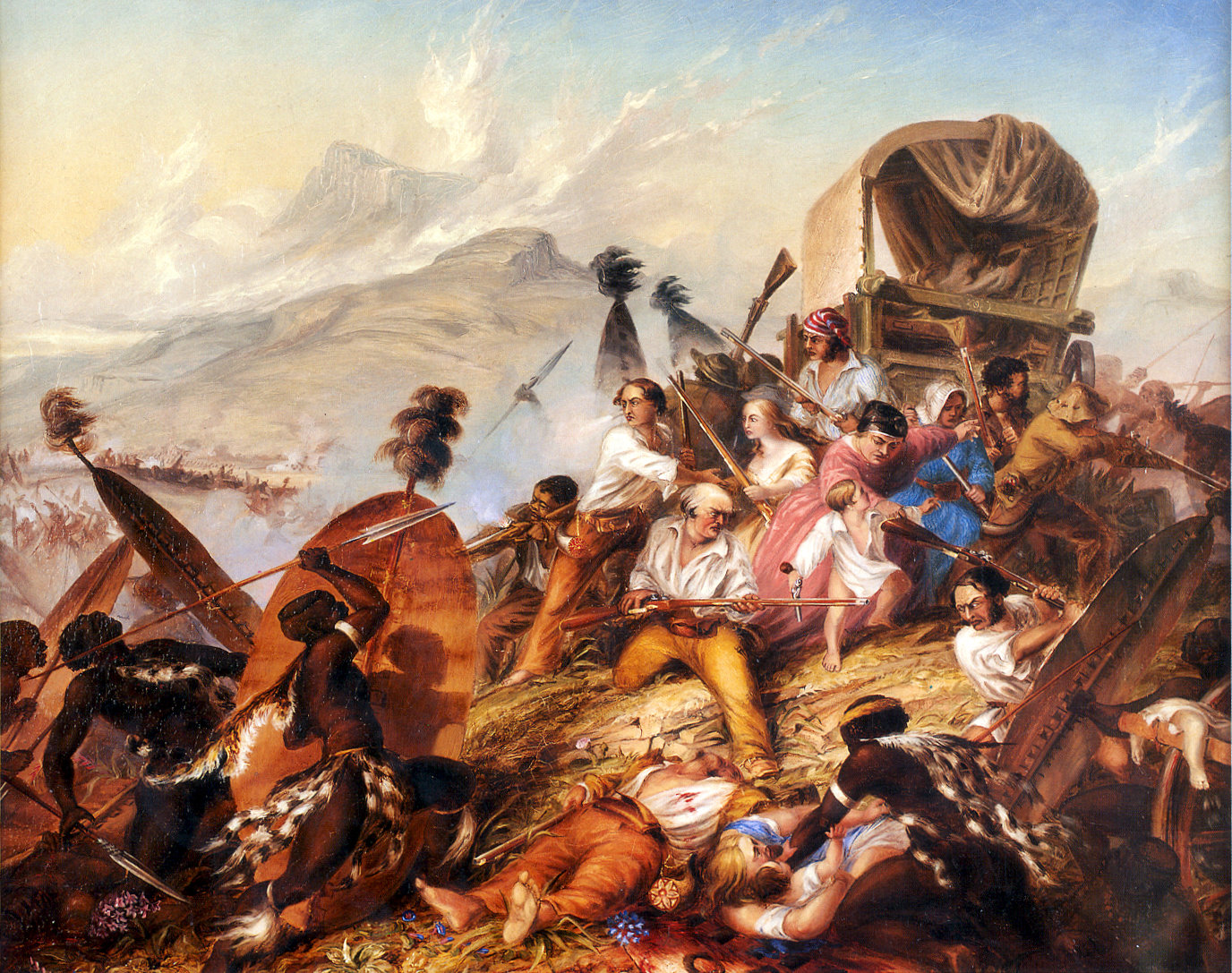
Depiction of a Zulu attack on a Boer camp in February 1838

By the 19th century, most Khoikhoi territory was under Boer control. The Khoikhoi had lost economic and political independence and had been absorbed into Boer society. The Boers spoke Afrikaans, a language or dialect derived from Dutch, and no longer called themselves Boers but Afrikaners. Some Khoikhoi were used as commandos in raids against other Khoikhoi and later Xhosa. A mixed Khoi, slave, and European population called the Cape Coloureds, who were outcasts within colonial society, also arose. Khoikhoi who lived far on the frontier included the Kora, Oorlams, and Griqua. In 1795, the British took over the cape colony from the Dutch.

In the 1830s, Boers embarked on a journey of expansion, east of the Great Fish River into the Zuurveld. They were referred to as Voortrekkers. They founded republics of the Transvaal and Orange Free State, mostly in areas of sparse population that had been diminished by the Mfecane/Difaqane. Unlike the Khoisan, the Bantu states were not conquered by the Afrikaners, because of population density and greater unity. Additionally, they began to arm themselves with guns acquired through trade at the cape. In some cases, as in the Xhosa/Boer Wars, Boers were removed from Xhosa lands. It required a dedicated imperial military force to subdue the Bantu-speaking states. In 1901, the Boer republics were defeated by Britain in the Second Boer War. The defeat however consummated many Afrikaners' ambition: South Africa would be under white rule. The British placed all power—legislative, executive, administrative—in English and Afrikaner hands.

== European trade, exploration and conquest ==
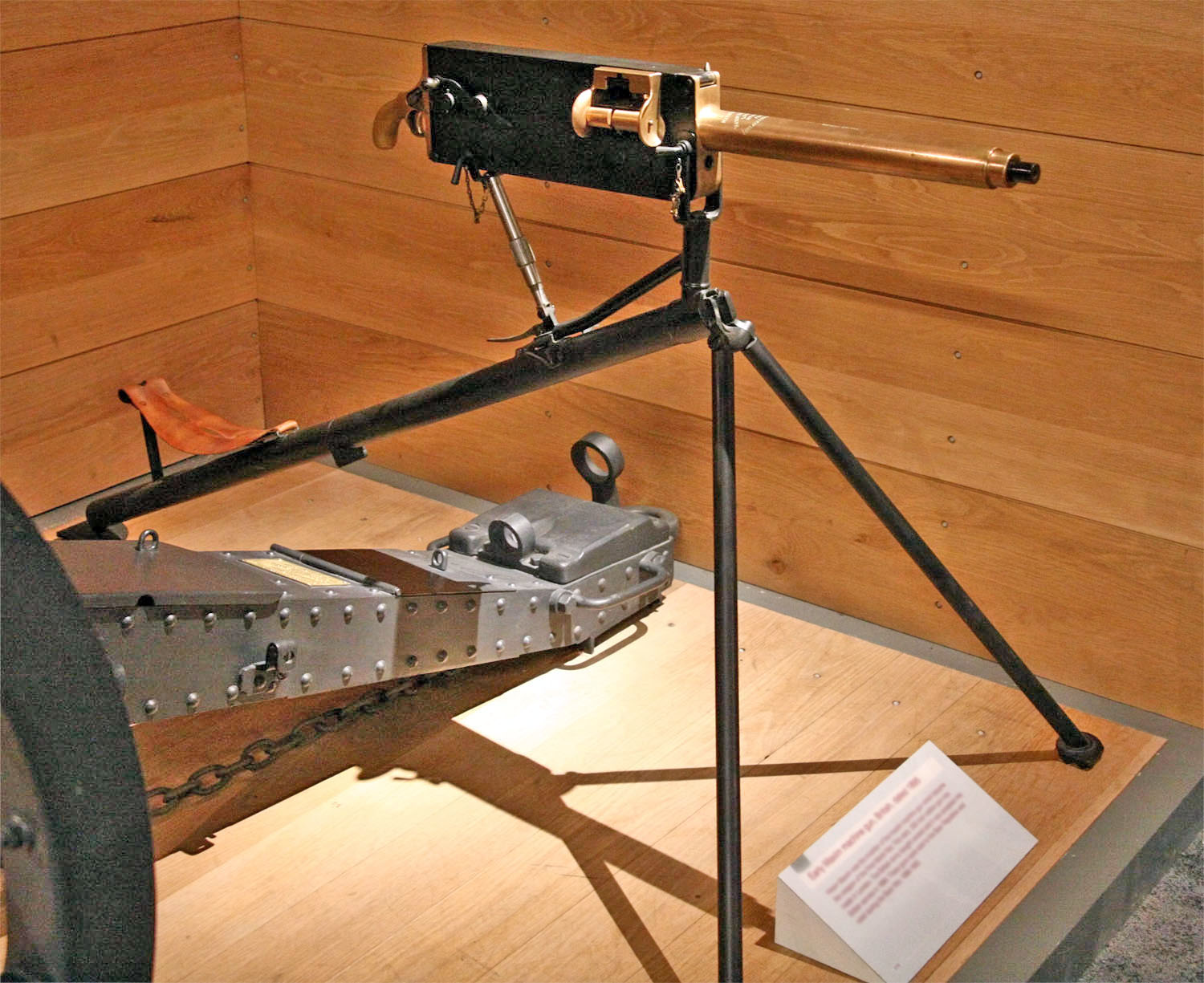
1895 .303 tripod mounted Maxim machine gun

Between 1878 and 1898, European states partitioned and conquered most of Africa. For 400 years, European nations had mainly limited their involvement to trading stations on the African coast. Few dared venture inland from the coast; those that did, like the Portuguese, often met defeats and had to retreat to the coast. Several technological innovations helped to overcome this 400-year pattern. One was the development of repeating rifles, which were easier and quicker to load than muskets. Artillery was being used increasingly. In 1885, Hiram S. Maxim developed the maxim gun, the model of the modern-day machine gun. European states kept these weapons largely among themselves by refusing to sell these weapons to African leaders.

African germs took numerous European lives and deterred permanent settlements. Diseases such as yellow fever, sleeping sickness, yaws, and leprosy made Africa a very inhospitable place for Europeans. The deadliest disease was malaria, endemic throughout Tropical Africa. In 1854, the discovery of quinine and other medical innovations helped to make conquest and colonization in Africa possible.

Strong motives for conquest of Africa were at play. Raw materials were needed for European factories. Europe in the early part of the 19th century was undergoing its Industrial Revolution. Nationalist rivalries and prestige were at play. Acquiring African colonies would show rivals that a nation was powerful and significant. These factors culminated in the Scramble for Africa.

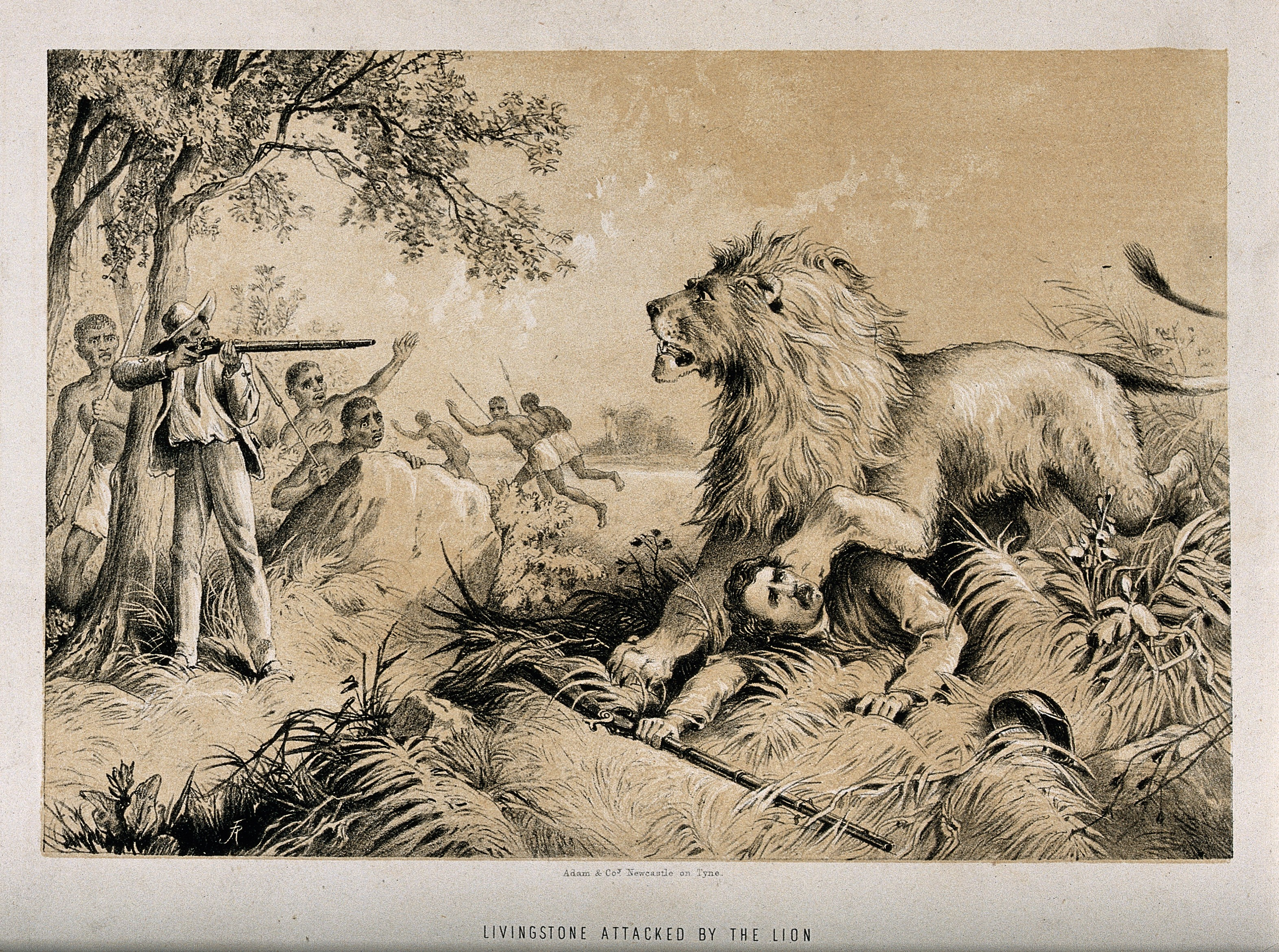
David Livingstone, early European explorer of the interior of Africa, is attacked by a lion.

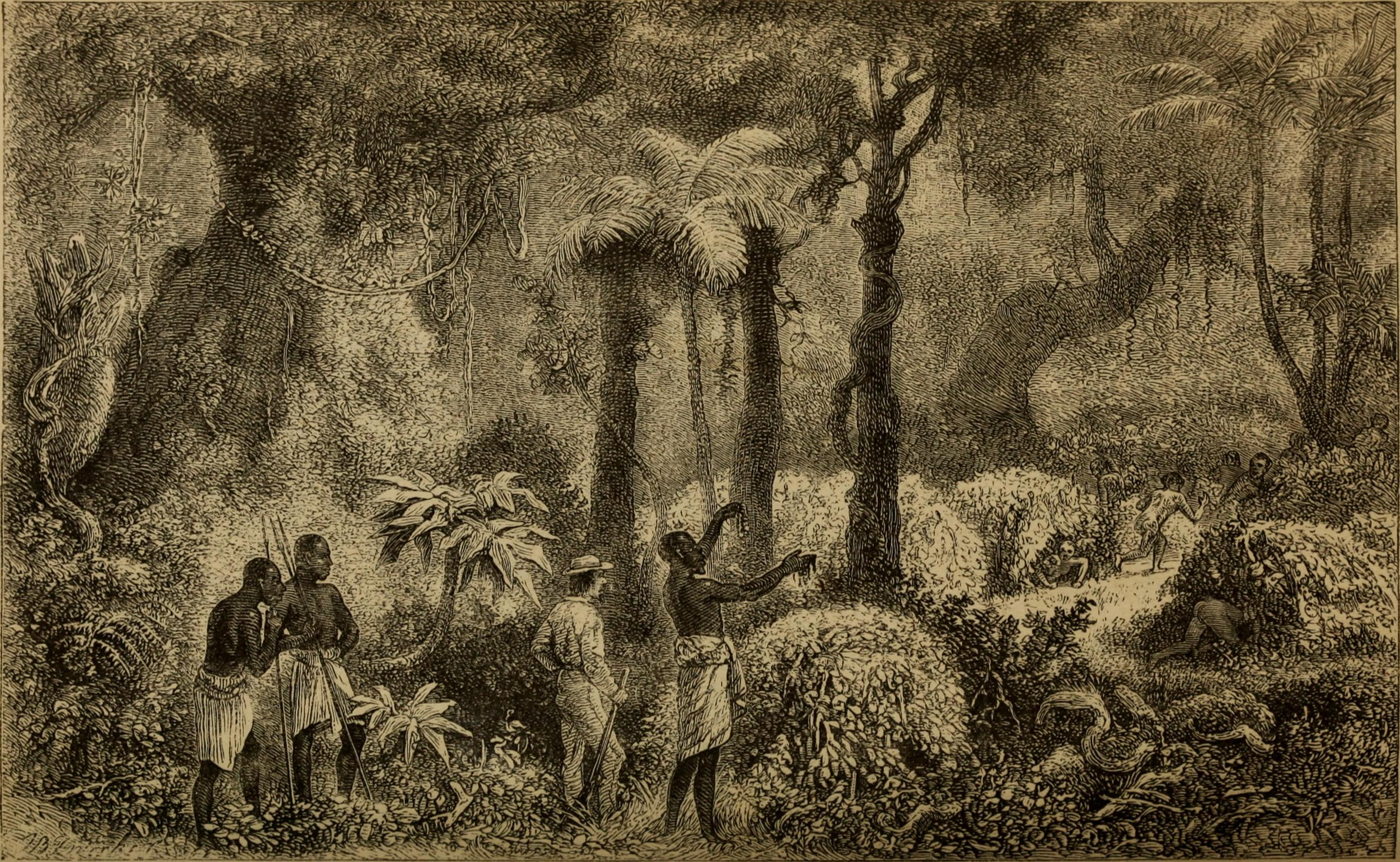
French explorer Paul Du Chaillu confirmed the existence of Pygmy peoples of central Africa

Knowledge of Africa increased. Numerous European explorers began to explore the continent. Mungo Park traversed the Niger River. James Bruce travelled through Ethiopia and located the source of the Blue Nile. Richard Francis Burton was the first European at Lake Tanganyika. Samuel White Baker explored the Upper Nile. John Hanning Speke located a source of the Nile at Lake Victoria. Other significant European explorers included Heinrich Barth, Henry Morton Stanley (coiner of the term "Dark Continent" for Africa in an 1878 book), Silva Porto, Alexandre de Serpa Pinto, Rene Caille, Friedrich Gerhard Rohlfs, Gustav Nachtigal, George Schweinfurth, and Joseph Thomson. The most famous of the explorers was David Livingstone, who explored southern Africa and traversed the continent from the Atlantic at Luanda to the Indian Ocean at Quelimane. European explorers made use of African guides and servants, and established long-distance trading routes.

Missionaries attempting to spread Christianity also increased European knowledge of Africa. Between 1884 and 1885, European nations met at the Berlin West Africa Conference to discuss the partitioning of Africa. It was agreed that European claims to parts of Africa would only be recognised if Europeans provided effective occupation. In a series of treaties in 1890–1891, colonial boundaries were completely drawn. All of Sub-Saharan Africa was claimed by European powers, except for Ethiopia (Abyssinia) and Liberia.

The European powers set up a variety of different administrations in Africa, reflecting different ambitions and degrees of power. In some areas, such as parts of British West Africa, colonial control was tenuous and intended for simple economic extraction, strategic power, or as part of a long-term development plan. In other areas, Europeans were encouraged to settle, creating settler states in which a European minority dominated. Settlers only came to a few colonies in sufficient numbers to have a strong impact. British settler colonies included British East Africa (now Kenya), Northern and Southern Rhodesia, (Zambia and Zimbabwe, respectively), and South Africa, which already had a significant population of European settlers, the Boers. France planned to settle Algeria and eventually incorporate it into the French state on an equal basis with the European provinces. Algeria's proximity across the Mediterranean allowed plans of this scale.

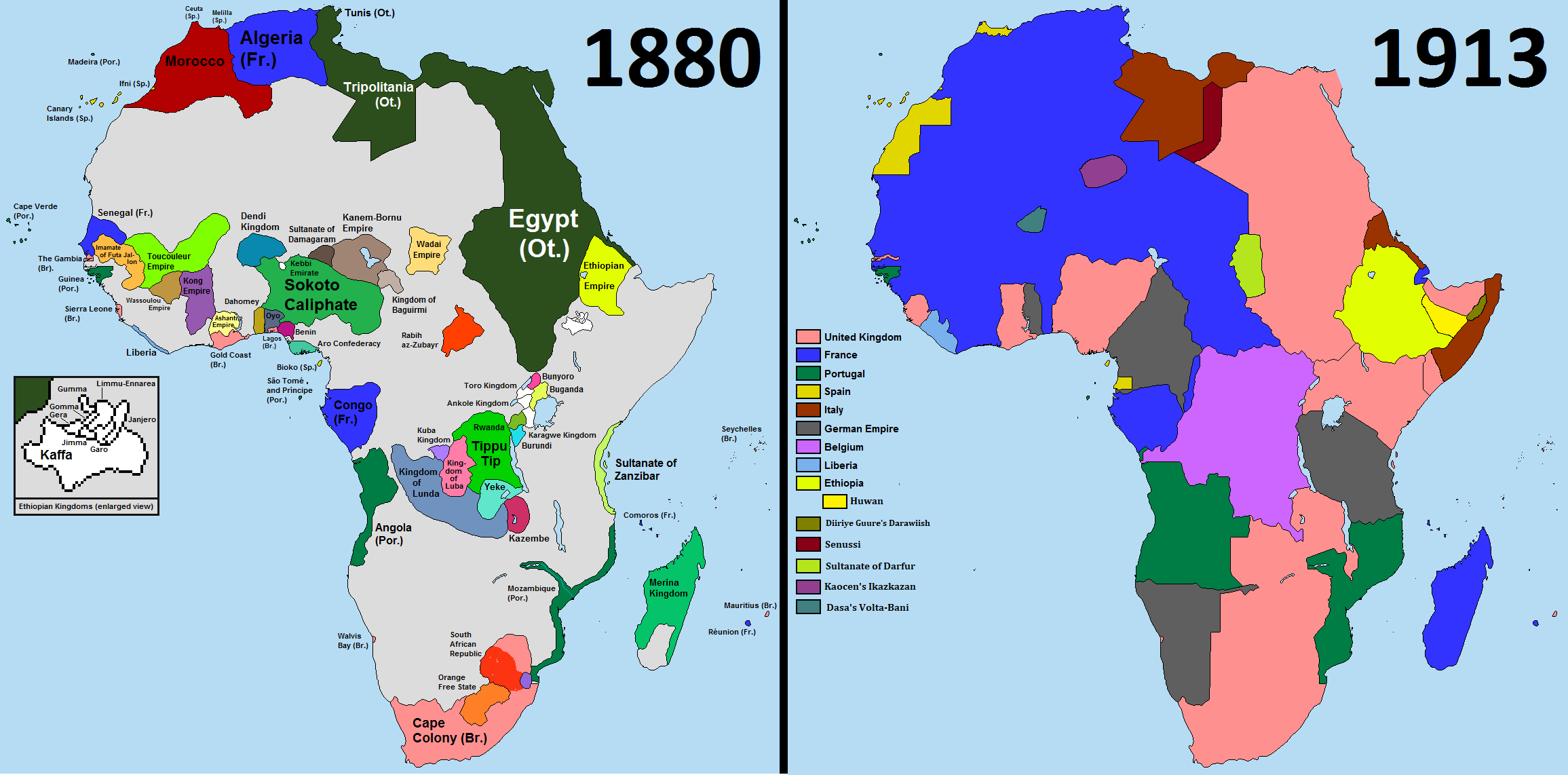
Comparison of Africa in 1880 and 1913, showing the "Scramble for Africa" by the European powers

In most areas colonial administrations did not have the manpower or resources to fully administer the territory and had to rely on local power structures to help them. Various factions and groups within the societies exploited this European requirement for their own purposes, attempting to gain positions of power within their own communities by cooperating with Europeans. One aspect of this struggle included what Terence Ranger has termed the "invention of tradition." In order to legitimize their own claims to power in the eyes of both the colonial administrators and their own people, native elites would essentially manufacture "traditional" claims to power, or ceremonies. As a result, many societies were thrown into disarray by the new order.

Following the Scramble for Africa, an early but secondary focus for most colonial regimes was the suppression of slavery and the slave trade. By the end of the colonial period they were mostly successful in this aim, though slavery is still very active in Africa.

== France versus Britain: the Fashoda crisis of 1898 ==
Central and east Africa, 1898, during the Fashoda Incident

As a part of the Scramble for Africa, France had the establishment of a continuous west–east axis of the continent as an objective, in contrast with the British north–south axis. Tensions between Britain and France reached tinder stage in Africa. At several points war was possible, but never happened. The most serious episode was the Fashoda Incident of 1898. French troops tried to claim an area in the Southern Sudan, and a much more powerful British force purporting to be acting in the interests of the Khedive of Egypt arrived to confront them. Under heavy pressure the French withdrew securing British control over the area. The status quo was recognised by an agreement between the two states acknowledging British control over Egypt, while France became the dominant power in Morocco, but France suffered a humiliating defeat overall.

== European colonial territories ==
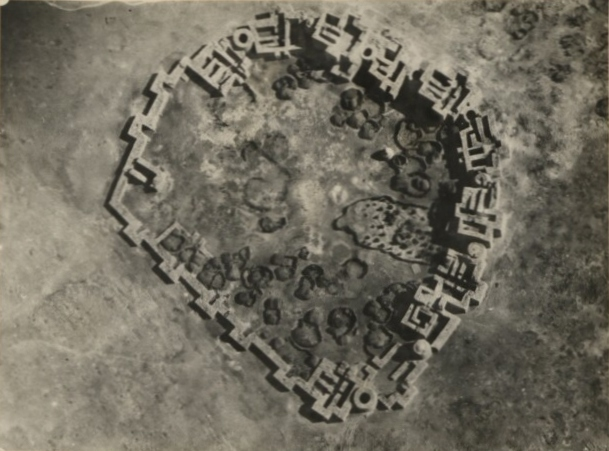
Aerial view of one of the Dhulbahante garad & Darawiish king Diiriye Guure's Dhulbahante Garesa's (forts) in Taleh, Somalia, the capital of his Dervish State. Dhulbahante garesas were the first places to be airstriked in African history

Areas controlled by European colonial powers on the African continent in 1914

Belgium

- Congo Free State and Belgian Congo (today's Democratic Republic of the Congo)
- Ruanda-Urundi (comprising modern Rwanda and Burundi, between 1916 and 1960)

France

- French West Africa:
  - Mauritania
  - Senegal
  - French Sudan (now Mali)
  - French Guinea (now Guinea)
  - Ivory Coast
  - Niger
  - French Upper Volta (now Burkina Faso)
  - French Dahomey (now Benin)
- French Algeria (now Algeria)
- Tunisia
- French Morocco
- French Somaliland (now Djibouti)
- Madagascar
- Comoros
- French Equatorial Africa:
  - Gabon
  - Middle Congo (now the Republic of the Congo)
  - Oubangi-Chari (now the Central African Republic)
  - Chad

Germany

- German Kamerun (now Cameroon and part of Nigeria)
- German East Africa (now Rwanda, Burundi and most of Tanzania)
- German South West Africa (now Namibia)
- German Togoland (now Togo and eastern part of Ghana)

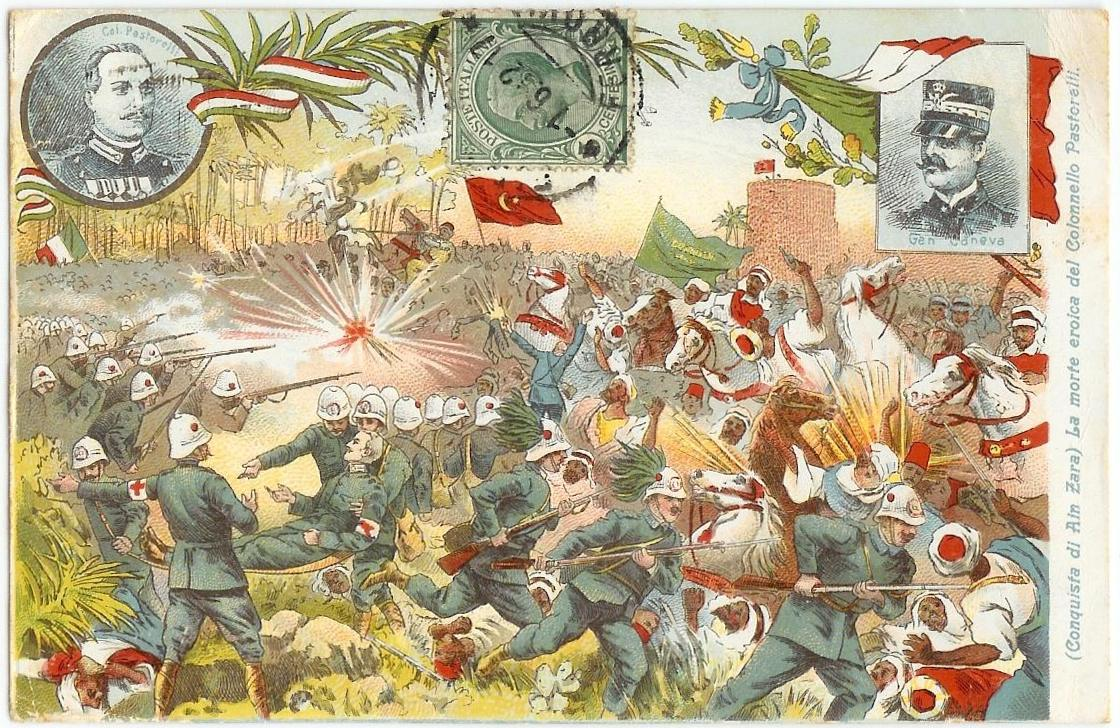
Italian invasion of Libya in 1911: propaganda postcard made by Italian Army

Italy

- Italian North Africa (now Libya)
- Eritrea
- Italian Somaliland (now part of Somalia)

Portugal

- Portuguese West Africa (now Angola)
  - Mainland Angola
  - Portuguese Congo (now Cabinda Province of Angola)
- Portuguese East Africa (now Mozambique)
- Portuguese Guinea (now Guinea-Bissau)
- Cape Verde Islands
- São Tomé e Príncipe
  - São Tomé Island
  - Príncipe Island
  - Fort of São João Baptista de Ajudá (now Ouidah, in Benin)

Spain

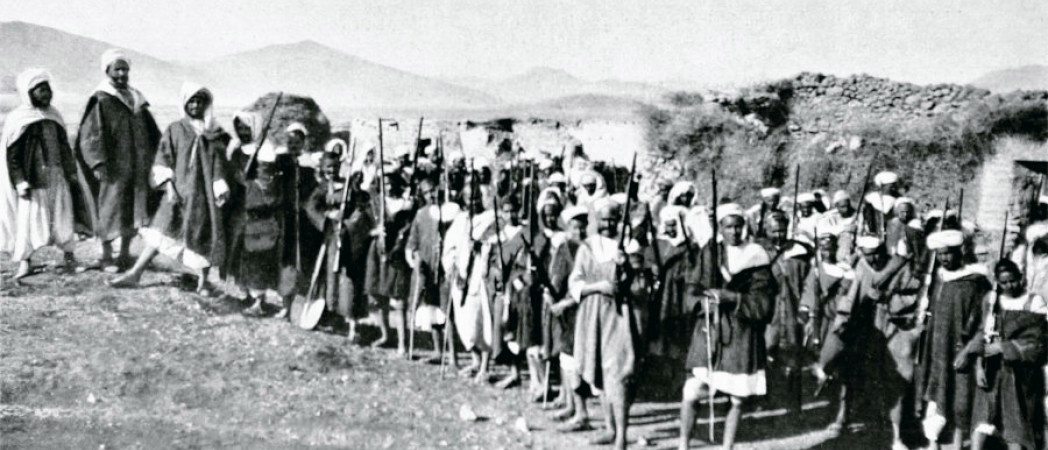
Riffian rebels during the Rif War in Spanish Morocco, 1922

- Spanish Sahara (now Western Sahara)
  - Río de Oro
  - Saguia el-Hamra
- Spanish Morocco
  - Tarfaya Strip
  - Ifni
- Spanish Guinea (now Equatorial Guinea)
  - Fernando Po
  - Río Muni
  - Annobón

United Kingdom

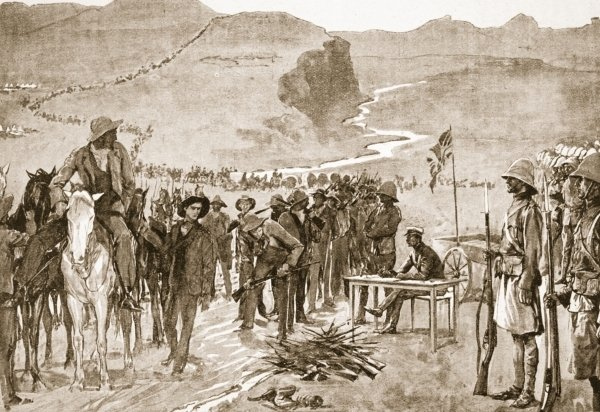
The result of the Boer Wars was the annexation of the Boer Republics to the British Empire in 1902

- Egypt
- Anglo-Egyptian Sudan (now Sudan)
- British Somaliland (now part of Somalia)
- British East Africa:
  - Kenya
  - Uganda Protectorate (now Uganda)
  - Tanganyika (1919–1961, now part of Tanzania)
- Zanzibar (now part of Tanzania)
- Bechuanaland (now Botswana)
- Southern Rhodesia (now Zimbabwe)
- Northern Rhodesia (now Zambia)
- British South Africa (now South Africa)
  - Transvaal (now part of South Africa)
  - Cape Colony (now part of South Africa)
  - Colony of Natal (now part of South Africa)
  - Orange Free State (now part of South Africa)
- The Gambia
- Sierra Leone
- Nigeria
- Cameroons (now parts of Cameroon and Nigeria)
- British Gold Coast (now Ghana)
- Nyasaland (now Malawi)
- Basutoland (now Lesotho)
- Swaziland

Independent states

- Liberia, founded by the American Colonization Society of the United States in 1821; declared independence from the United States in 1847
- Ethiopian Empire (Abyssinia) had its borders re-drawn with Italian Eritrea and French Somaliland (modern Djibouti), briefly occupied by Italy from 1936 to 1941 during the Abyssinia Crisis;
- Sudan, independent under Mahdi rule between 1885 and 1899. It was then under British rule from 1899 to 1956.

== 20th century ==
In the 1880s the European powers had divided up almost all of Africa (only Ethiopia and Liberia were independent). They ruled until after World War II when forces of nationalism grew much stronger. In the 1950s and 1960s the colonial holdings became independent states. The process was usually peaceful but there were several long bitter bloody civil wars, as in Algeria, Kenya and elsewhere. Across Africa the powerful new force of nationalism drew upon the organizational skills that natives learned in the British and French and other armies in the world wars. It led to organizations that were not controlled by or endorsed by either the colonial powers not the traditional local power structures that were collaborating with the colonial powers. Nationalistic organizations began to challenge both the traditional and the new colonial structures and finally displaced them. Leaders of nationalist movements took control when the European authorities exited; many ruled for decades or until they died off. These structures included political, educational, religious, and other social organizations. In recent decades, many African countries have undergone the triumph and defeat of nationalistic fervor, changing in the process the loci of the centralizing state power and patrimonial state.

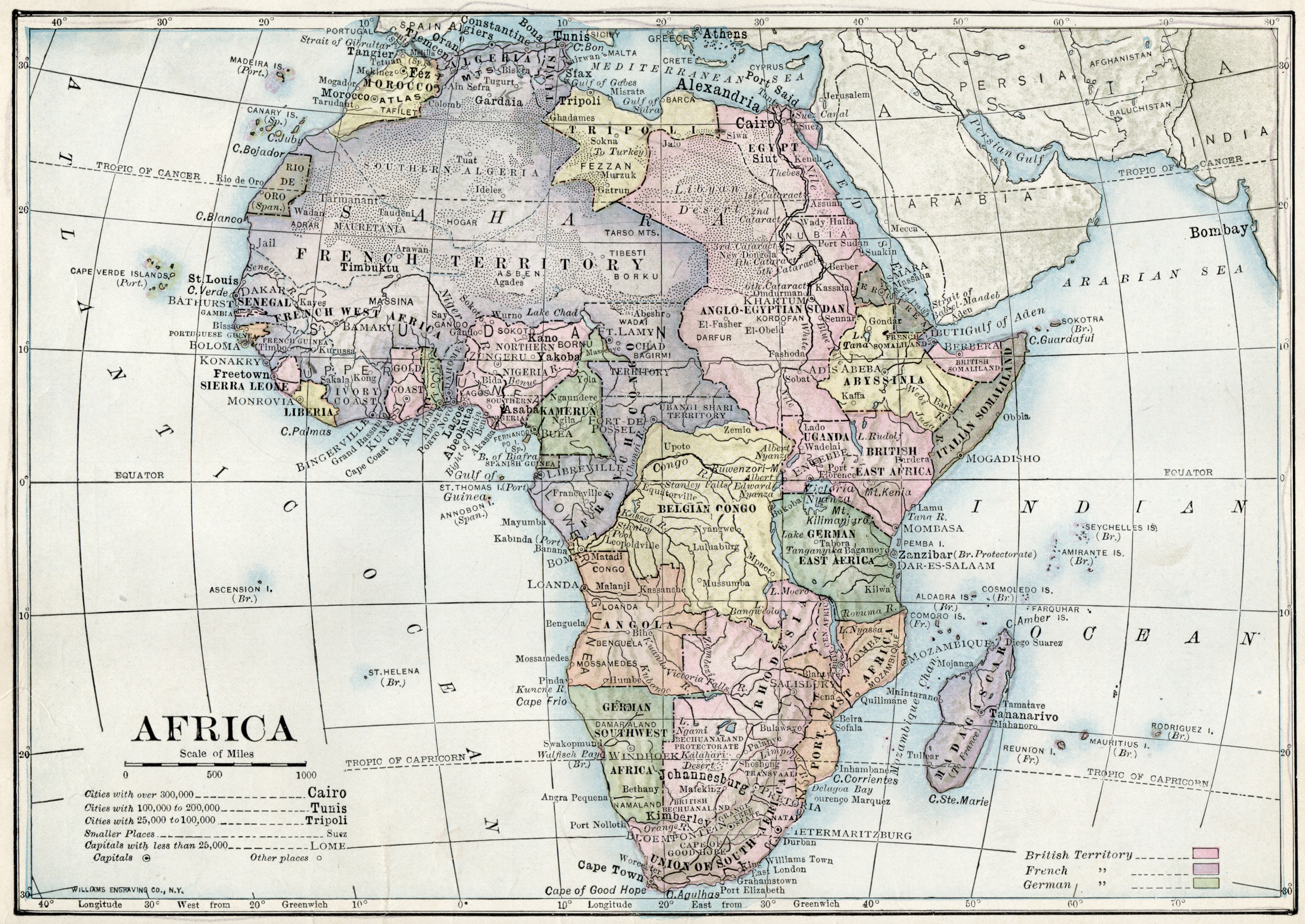
1916 political map of Africa

=== World War I ===
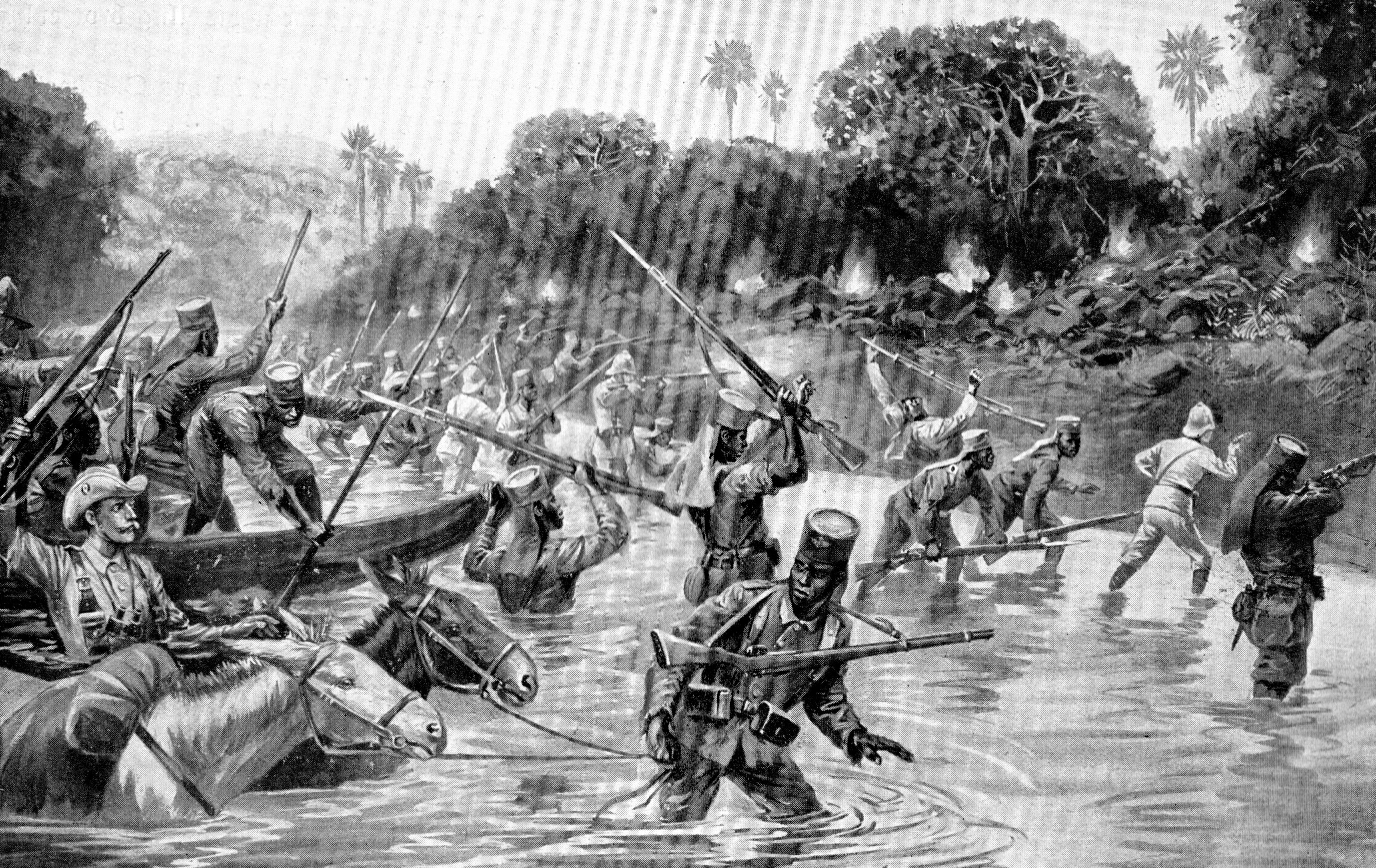
The Battle of Ngomano in November 1917

With the vast majority of the continent under the colonial control of European governments, the World Wars were significant events in the geopolitical history of Africa. Africa was a theater of war and saw fighting in both wars. More important in most regions, the total war footing of colonial powers impacted the governance of African colonies, through resource allocation, conscription, and taxation. In World War I there were several campaigns in Africa, including the Togoland Campaign, the Kamerun campaign, the South West Africa campaign, and the East African campaign. In each, Allied forces, primarily British, but also French, Belgian, South African, and Portuguese, sought to force the Germans out of their African colonies. In each, German forces were badly outnumbered and, due to Allied naval superiority, were cut off from reinforcement or resupply. The Allies eventually conquered all German colonies; German forces in East Africa managed to avoid surrender throughout the war, though they could not hold any territory after 1917. After World War I, former German colonies in Africa were taken over by France, Belgium, and the British Empire.

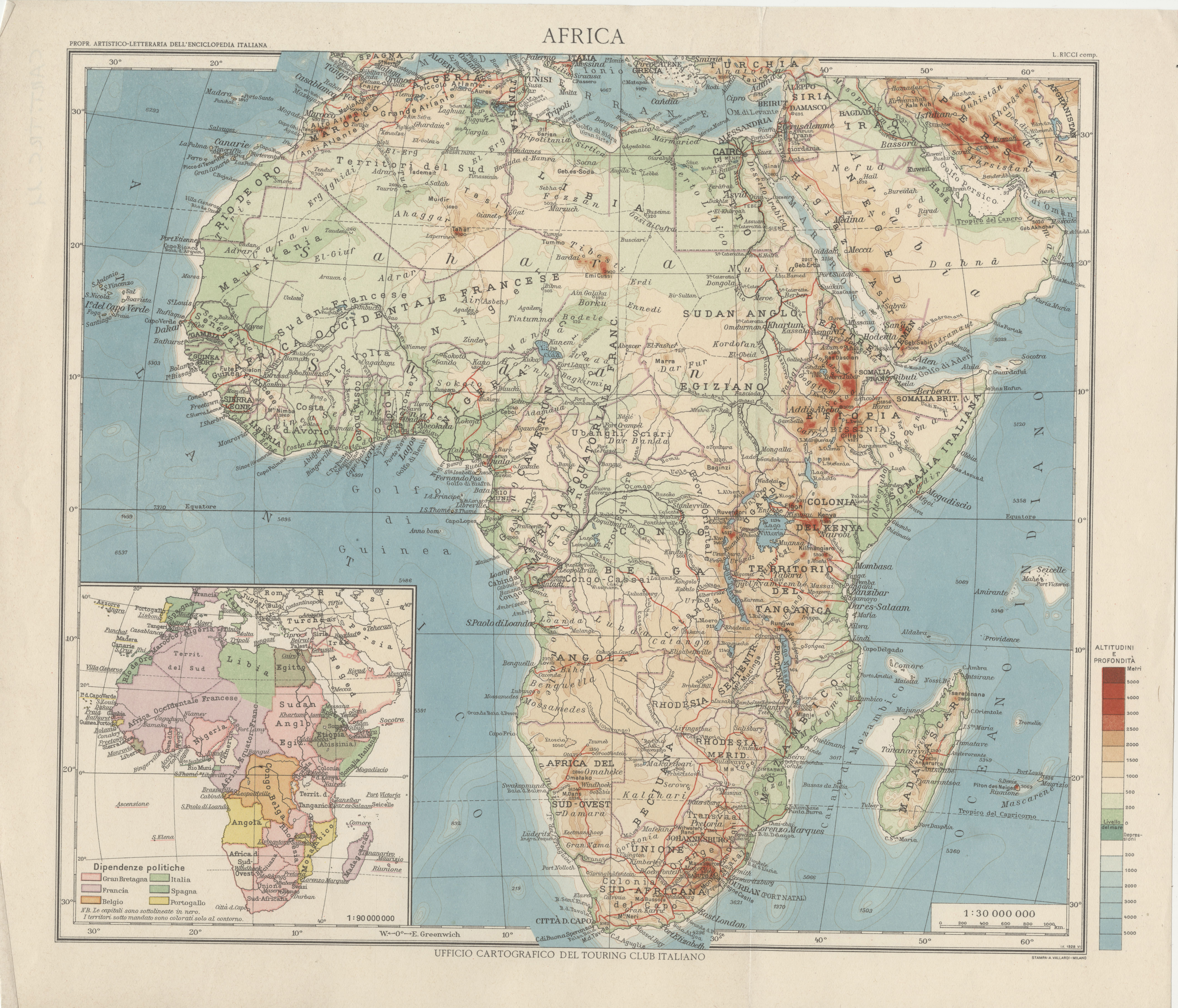
Physical and political elements of the African continent in 1929

After World War I, colonial powers continued to consolidate their control over their African territories. In some areas, particularly in Southern and East Africa, large settler populations were successful in pressing for additional devolution of administration, so-called "home rule" by the white settlers. In many cases, settler regimes were harsher on African populations, tending to see them more as a threat to political power, as opposed to colonial regimes which had generally endeavored to co-opt local populations into economic production. The Great Depression strongly affected Africa's non-subsistence economy, much of which was based on commodity production for Western markets. As demand increased in the late 1930s, Africa's economy rebounded as well.

Africa was the site of one of the first instances of fascist territorial expansions in the 1930s. Italy had attempted to conquer Ethiopia in the 1890s but had been rebuffed in the First Italo-Ethiopian War. Ethiopia lay between two Italian colonies, Italian Somaliland and Eritrea and was invaded in October 1935. With an overwhelming advantage in armor and aircraft, by May 1936, Italian forces had occupied the capital of Addis Ababa and effectively declared victory. Ethiopia and their other colonies were consolidated into Italian East Africa.

=== World War II: Political ===
Areas controlled by European powers in 1939. British (red) and Belgian (marroon) colonies fought with the Allies. Italian (light green) with the Axis. French colonies (dark blue) fought alongside the Allies until the Fall of France in June 1940. Vichy was in control until the Free French prevailed in late 1942. Portuguese (dark green) and Spanish (yellow) colonies remained neutral.

Africa was a large continent whose geography gave it strategic importance during the war. North Africa was the scene of major British and American campaigns against Italy and Germany; East Africa was the scene of a major British campaign against Italy. The vast geography provided major transportation routes linking the United States to the Middle East and Mediterranean regions. The sea route around South Africa was heavily used even though it added 40 days to voyages that had to avoid the dangerous Suez region. Lend Lease supplies to Russia often came this way. Internally, long-distance road and railroad connections facilitated the British war effort. The Union of South Africa had dominion status and was largely self-governing, the other British possessions were ruled by the Colonial Office, usually with close ties to local chiefs and kings. Italian holdings were the target of successful British military campaigns. The Belgian Congo, and two other Belgian colonies, were major exporters. In terms of numbers and wealth, the British controlled the richest portions of Africa, and made extensive use not only of the geography, but the manpower, and the natural resources. Civilian colonial officials made a special effort to upgrade the African infrastructure, promote agriculture, integrate colonial Africa with the world economy, and recruit over a half million soldiers.

Before the war, Britain had made few plans for the utilization of Africa, but it quickly set up command structures. The Army set up the West Africa Command, which recruited 200,000 soldiers. The East Africa Command was created in September 1941 to support the overstretched Middle East Command. It provided the largest number of men, over 320,000, chiefly from Kenya, Tanganyika, and Uganda. The Southern Command was the domain of South Africa. The Royal Navy set up the South Atlantic Command based in Sierra Leone, that became one of the main convoy assembly points. The RAF Coastal Command had major submarine-hunting operations based in West Africa, while a smaller RAF command dealt with submarines in the Indian Ocean. Ferrying aircraft from North America and Britain was the major mission of the Western Desert Air Force. In addition smaller more localized commands were set up throughout the war.

Before 1939, the military establishments were very small throughout British Africa, and largely consisted of whites, who comprised under two percent of the population outside South Africa. As soon as the war began, newly created African units were set up, primarily by the Army. The new recruits were almost always volunteers, usually provided in close cooperation with local tribal leaders. During the war, military pay scales far exceeded what civilians natives could earn, especially when food, housing and clothing allowances are included. The largest numbers were in construction units, called Pioneer units, with over 82,000 soldiers. The RAF and Navy also did some recruiting. The volunteers did some fighting, a great deal of guard duty, and construction work. 80,000 served in the Middle East. A special effort was made not to challenge white supremacy, certainly before the war, and to a large extent during the war itself. Nevertheless, the soldiers were drilled and train to European standards, given strong doses of propaganda, and learn leadership and organizational skills that proved essential to the formation of nationalistic and independence movements after 1945. There were minor episodes of discontent, but nothing serious, among the natives. Afrikaner nationalism was a factor in South Africa, But the pro-German Afrikaner prime minister was replaced in 1939 by Jan Smuts, an Afrikaner who was an enthusiastic supporter of the British Empire. His government closely cooperated with London and raised 340,000 volunteers (190,000 were white, or about one-third of the eligible white men).

==== French Africa ====
As early as 1857, the French established volunteer units of black soldiers in sub-Sahara Africa, termed the Tirailleurs Sénégalais. They served in military operations throughout the Empire, including 171,000 soldiers in World War I and 160,000 in World War II. About 90,000 became POWs in Germany. The veterans played a central role in the postwar independence movement in French Africa.

Authorities in West Africa declared allegiance to the Vichy regime, as did the colony of French Gabon Vichy forces defeated a Free French Forces invasion of French West Africa in the two battles of Dakar in July and September 1940. Gabon fell to Free France after the Battle of Gabon in November 1940, but West Africa remained under Vichy control until November 1942. Vichy forces tried to resist the overwhelming Allied landings in North Africa (operation Torch) in November 1942. Vichy Admiral François Darlan suddenly switched sides and the fighting ended. The Allies gave Darlan control of North African French forces in exchange for support from both French North Africa as well as French West Africa. Vichy was now eliminated as a factor in Africa. Darlan was assassinated in December, and the two factions of Free French, led by Charles de Gaulle and Henri Giraud, jockeyed for power. De Gaulle finally won out.

=== World War II: Military ===
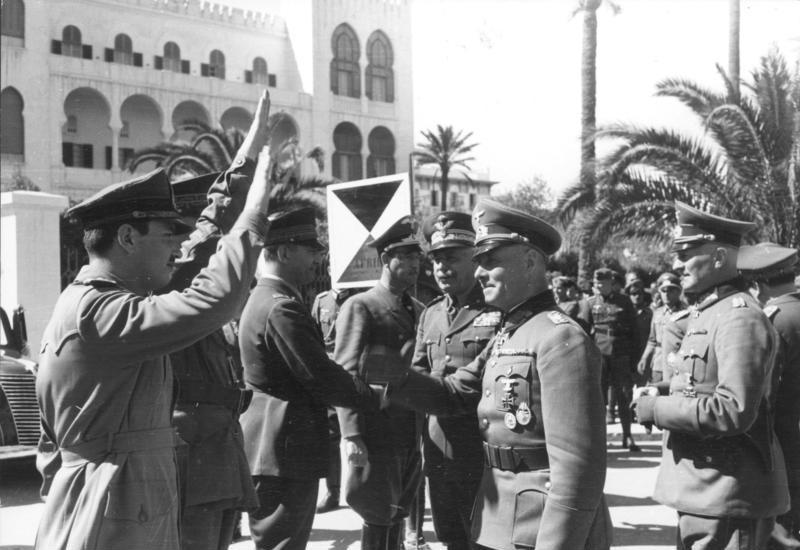
Erwin Rommel with Italian governor of Libya, General Italo Gariboldi (on Rommel's right), in Tripoli, February 1941

Since Germany had lost its African colonies following World War I, World War II did not reach Africa until Italy joined the war on June 10, 1940, controlling Libya and Italian East Africa. With the fall of France on June 25, most of France's colonies in North and West Africa were controlled by the Vichy government, though much of Central Africa fell under Free French control after some fighting between Vichy and Free French forces at the Battle of Dakar and the Battle of Gabon. After the fall of France, Africa was the only active theater for ground combat until the Italian invasion of Greece in October. In the Western Desert campaign Italian forces from Libya sought to overrun Egypt, controlled by the British. Simultaneously, in the East African campaign, Italian East African forces overran British Somaliland and some British outposts in Kenya and Anglo-Egyptian Sudan. When Italy's efforts to conquer Egypt (including the crucial Suez Canal) and Sudan fell short, they were unable to reestablish supply to Italian East Africa. Without the ability to reinforce or resupply and surrounded by Allied possessions, Italian East Africa was conquered by mainly British and South African forces in 1941. In North Africa, the Italians soon requested help from the Germans who sent a substantial force under General Rommel. With German help, the Axis forces regained the upper hand but were unable to break through British defenses in two tries at El Alamein. In late 1942, Allied forces, mainly Americans and Canadians, invaded French North Africa in Operation Torch, where Vichy French forces initially surprised them with their resistance but were convinced to stop fighting after three days. The second front relieved pressure on the British in Egypt who began pushing west to meet up with the Torch forces, eventually pinning German and Italian forces in Tunisia, which was conquered by May 1943 in the Tunisia campaign, ending the war in Africa. The only other significant operations occurred in the French colony of Madagascar, which was invaded by the British in May 1942 to deny its ports to the Axis (potentially the Japanese who had reached the eastern Indian Ocean). The French garrisons in Madagascar surrendered in November 1942.

== See also ==
- Colonisation of Africa
- European exploration of Africa
- List of kingdoms in Africa throughout history
- Muslim conquest of the Maghreb
- Scramble for Africa
