= Matabele =

Matabele may refer to:

- Northern Ndebele people
- HMS Matabele (F26), a destroyer of the Royal Navy
- Matabele (beetle), a genus of beetle in the family Carabidae
- Megaponera, a genus of ants whose common name is Matabele ants.

== See also ==
- Ndebele (disambiguation)
