= Battle of Bembezi =

1893 battle of the First Matabele War

- Part of the First Matabele War
- Battle of Bembezi (Zimbabwe)
| Date | 1 November 1893 |
| Location | Bembezi, Zimbabwe 20°02′26″S 28°52′34″E |
| Result | British victory |

Belligerents
| British South Africa Company | Mthwakazi |

Commanders and leaders
| Patrick William Forbes | Lobengula |

Strength
| 700; 5 Maxim guns 3 other rapid-fire guns 2 cannons | 10,000 |

Casualties and losses
| Unknown | 2,500 killed |

Gadade Battlefield; Mbembesi Battlefield
- National Museums and Monuments of Zimbabwe
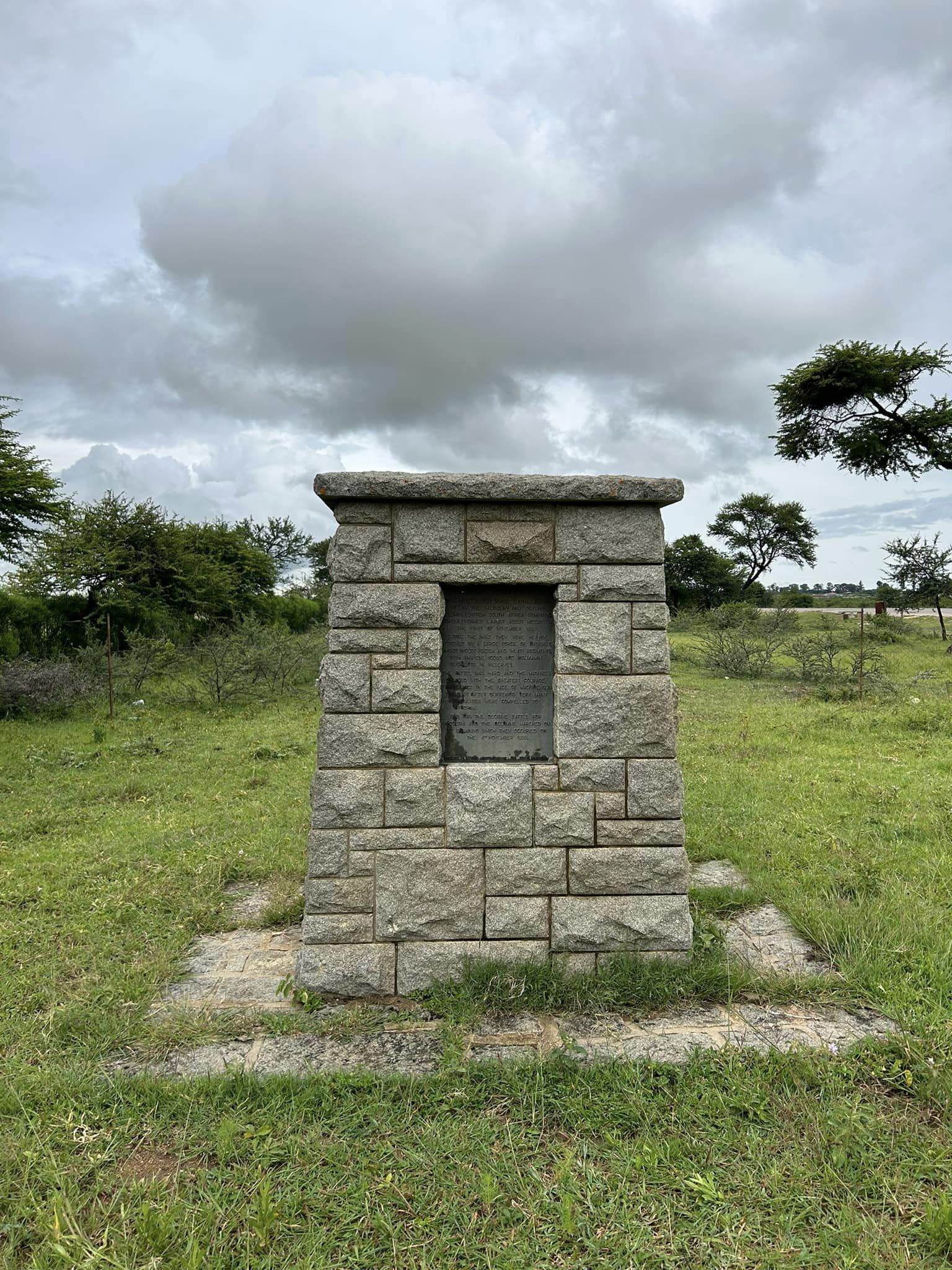
- Gadade Battlefield Memorial, outside Bulawayo
- For the dead of the Battles of Bembesi
- Established: 1961
- Location: 20.0371°S 28.8765°E near Bulawayo
- BATTLE OF IMBEMBESI On a hillock 300 yards south of this pillar the Salisbury and Victoria Columns (British South Africa Company’s forces) formed laager about midday on the First of November 1893. During the halt they were heavily attacked by a large force of Matabele (iMbizo, iNgubo, iSiziba and iHlati regiments with Amavene iQobo and iNsukamini regiments in reserve). The battle was hard and the Matabele charged with the greatest courage three times in the face of machine gun fire but after suffering very many casualties were compelled to withdraw. This was the decisive battle for Rhodesia and the Columns marched on to Bulawayo which they occupied on 4 November 1893. Erected by the Historical Monuments Commission

The Battle of Bembezi (1 November 1893) was an engagement of the First Matabele War, between the British South Africa Company and the Ndebele kingdom of Mthwakazi.

== Battle ==
The battle took place on 1 November 1893. This was the most decisive battle won by the British South Africa Company in the First Matabele War of 1893. The British South Africa Company went over to Ndebele positions and were almost ambushed, yet due to command issues they went another way with Ndebele spearman waiting for them. Though thoroughly outnumbered, (10,000 men to 700), the BSAC Maxim guns proved superior to Ndebele numbers. After sustaining heavy losses, the Ndebele began to retreat. Roughly 2,500 Ndebele were killed by the time the gunfire was over. After the stunning defeat, King Lobengula fled the battle; the end of the First Matabele War was near.

== Memorial ==
A memorial was erected by the National Museums and Monuments of Zimbabwe in 1961. The monument contains a plaque in both English and Ndebele reading:

BATTLE OF IMBEMBESI
On a hillock 300 yards south of this
pillar the Salisbury and Victoria
Columns (British South Africa Company’s
forces) formed laager about midday on
the First of November 1893.

During the halt they were heavily
attacked by a large force of Matabele
(iMbizo, iNgubo, iSiziba and iHlati regiments
with Amavene iQobo and iNsukamini
regiments in reserve).

The battle was hard and the Matabele
charged with the greatest courage
three times in the face of machine gun
fire but after suffering very many
casualties were compelled to
withdraw.

This was the decisive battle for
Rhodesia and the Columns marched on
to Bulawayo which they occupied on
4 November 1893.

Erected by the Historical Monuments Commission

== Music ==
John Edmond wrote the song Battle of Bembezi about the events of the battle.
