= Patrick William Forbes =

British colonial administrator

Major Patrick William Forbes (1861 – 1918) was a British South Africa Police officer who commanded a British South Africa Company force which invaded Matabeleland during the First Matabele War.

== Life ==
Forbes was born in 1861 at Whitechurch, England, the son of A. O. Forbes, of Whitchurch. He was educated at Rugby, Warwickshire and commissioned to the 6th Inniskilling Dragoons. In 1880, he went to Cape Colony and in 1889 he was made second-in-command of the British South Africa Police. Promoted to major in 1890, Forbes went on to command the Salisbury Column in Mashonaland, and later he was selected by the British South Africa Company (BSAC) as the Mashonaland Magistrate.

=== Matabele war ===
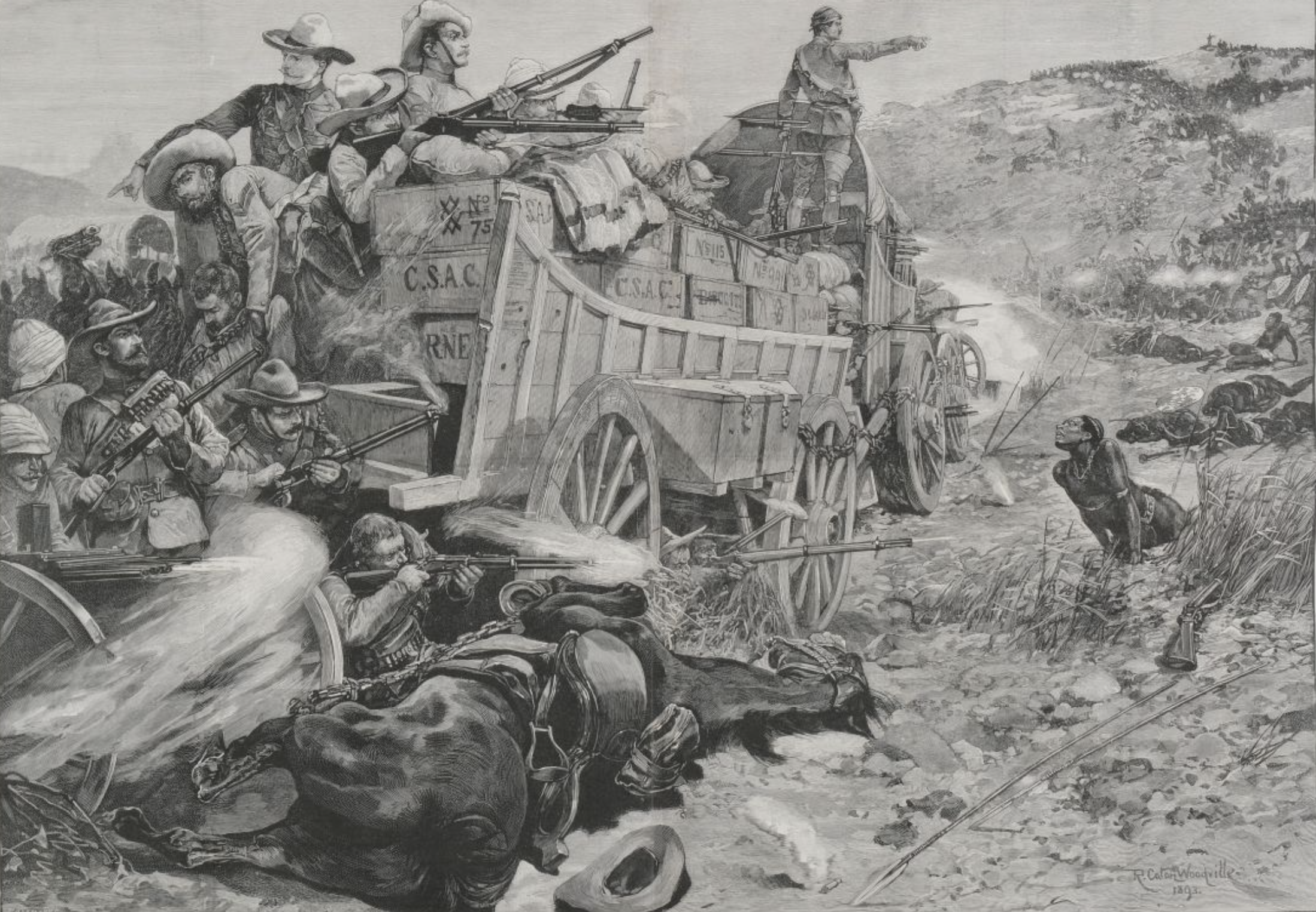
1893 illustration of the Battle of the Shangani by Richard Caton Woodville Jr.

In 1893, the First Matabele War broke out and Forbes was selected to command all forces in the region against the Ndebele (Matabele). He gathered a force of around 700 men from the BSAC. It advanced towards Bulawayo, capital of Matabeleland. In addition to rifles, the column was equipped with five Maxim guns, three other rapid-fire guns, two cannon, and 200 rifles. On 25 October 1893, the BSAC camped in a laager formation. That night, at around 2.15 AM, a large force of Matabele warriors attacked. At the Battle of the Shangani, the Maxim guns proved crucial to defeating them. Around 1,500 Matabele died. Others committed suicide rather than return defeated. Forbes advanced towards Bulawayo, encountering another large force a week later, on 1 November. 2,000 Matabele riflemen and 4,000 warriors attacked Forbes at Bembezi, about 30 miles (48 km) north-east of Bulawayo, but again they were no match for the crushing firepower of the major's Maxims: about 2,500 more Matabele were killed. At this point the Matabele king Lobengula evacuated Bulawayo and burned it.

=== Shangani Patrol ===
Cecil Rhodes and Leander Starr Jameson hoped to capture Lobengula and quickly end the 1893 war in Matabeleland. Jameson arrived at Bulawayo, following Forbes' capture of the town. Jameson then sent Forbes with a combined force of 200 men to find Lobengula. He received a tip about the whereabouts of the Ndebele King. Indecisive and reluctant to risk his men in unknown territory, he sent Major Allan Wilson and 12 men to pursue and capture Lobengula. Wilson's patrol found Lobengula, but they also found themselves greatly outnumbered—the small patrol had been led into a trap. On the night of 3 December 1893, knowing the Ndebele would not attack in the dark, Wilson sent back Captain Napier with 2 men with an urgent message requesting that Forbes come to his aid immediately and bring his 2 Maxim guns before daybreak. But Forbes again hesitated. He refused to move his column until daylight and instead sent only Capt Borrow and 21 men to Wilson as reinforcements.

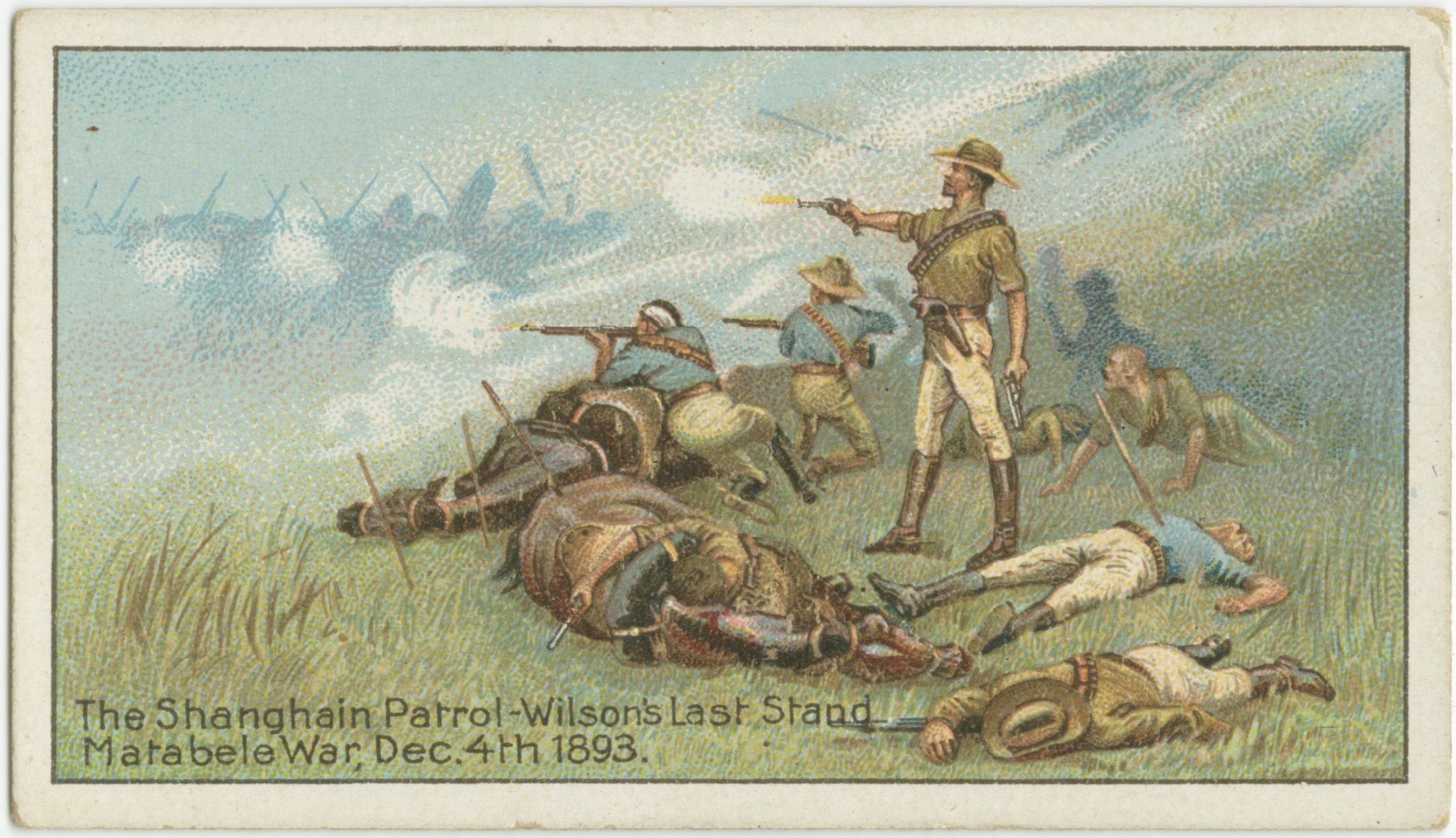
A cigarette card depicting "Wilson's Last Stand"

The next morning, Wilson and his men discovered that the Shangani river was now completely flooded due to rains and it could not be navigated without extensive fire cover, and Forbes was nowhere to be seen. The patrol was cut off from the main column and Wilson had no choice but to make a last stand. In desperation, Wilson sent the Americans Frederick Russell Burnham and Pete Ingram, and an Australian named Gooding, to cross the Shangani and seek reinforcements. Miraculously, the 3 scouts succeeded, but when they reached Forbes the battle raging at the main column was just as intense as the one they had just left. There was no hope of anyone reaching Wilson in time and all 34 men were killed by the Ndebele warriors. The Shangani Patrol incident achieved a lasting, prominent place in Rhodesian colonial history and is considered to be roughly the British equivalent to Custer's Last Stand.

Forbes, running out of supplies, retreated to Bulowayo, his column harassed continuously by the Ndebele. Forbes handed de facto control of the retreat to Piet Raaff, a veteran of the Anglo-Zulu War. He reached Bulawayo on 18 December 1893. Raaff died of a stomach condition shortly after arrival.

=== Later life ===
He was a member of Legion of Frontiersmen.

Forbes was criticised for being an indecisive leader who tried to compensate his shortcomings with a "by the book" attitude. Nonetheless, Forbes later became Commissioner to the BSAC territory in North-Eastern Rhodesia (now Zambia), from July 1895 to June 1897.

He married in the Foundling chapel on 21 January 1903 Beatrice Grey, daughter of Robert Grey, Treasurer of the Foundling Hospital.

Forbes died in 1918.

Political offices
Preceded by Francis William Rhodes	Magistrate of Mashonaland; 1893–1894	Succeeded by None; incorporated into Southern Rhodesia
Preceded by None	Administrator of North-Eastern Rhodesia; 1895–1897	Succeeded by Henry Lawrence Daly
