= First Matabele War =

1893–94 British invasion of the Ndebele Kingdom

- Part of the Scramble for Africa
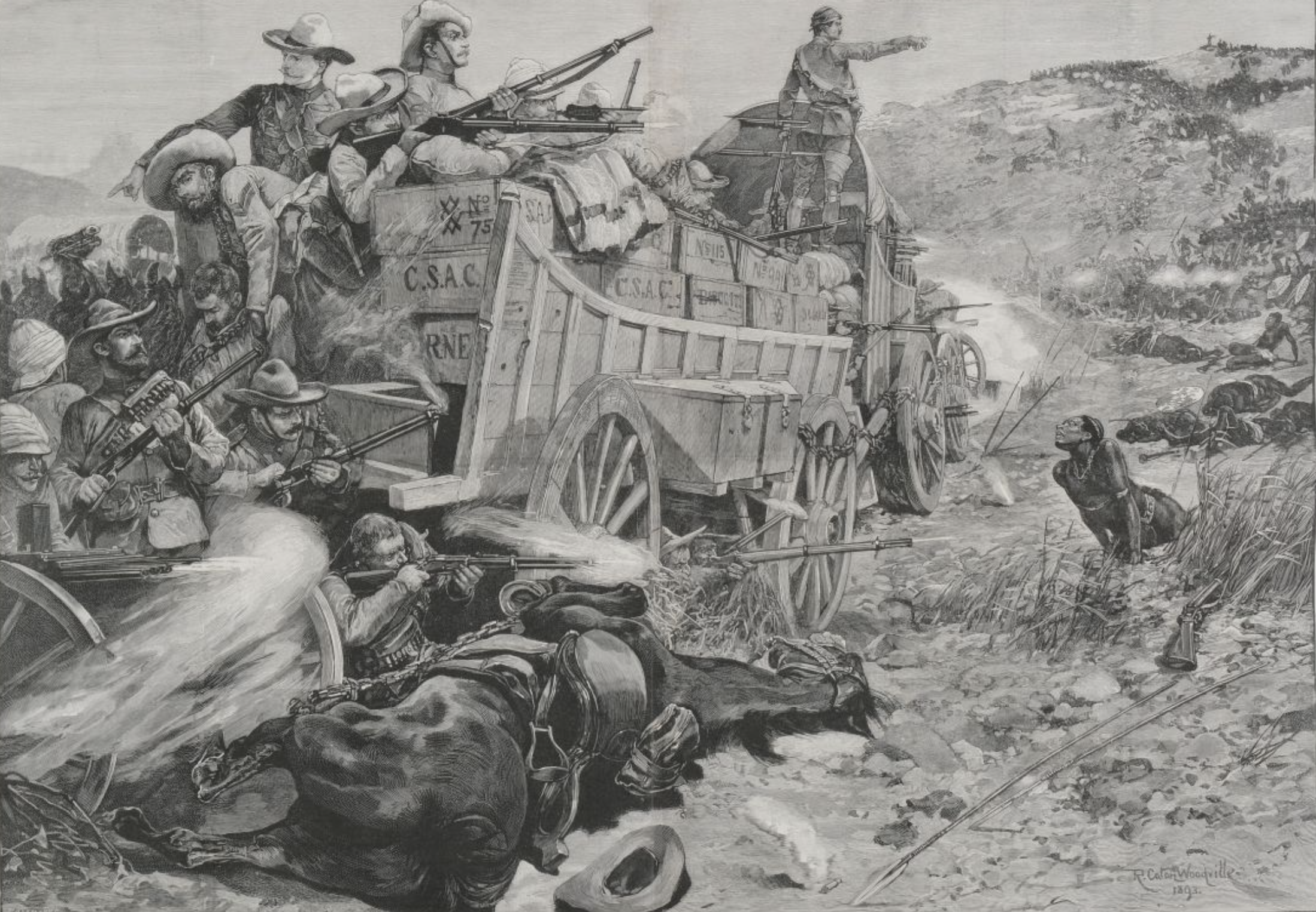
- Attack on the Laager of Wagons; Richard Caton Woodville Jr., 1893
| Date | October 1893 – January 1894 |
| Location | Matabeleland and Mashonaland |
| Result | British victory: Dissolution of the Ndebele kingdom of Mthwakazi |
| Territorial changes | Matabeleland brought under BSAC control |

Belligerents
| British South Africa Company; Tswana (Bechuana) | Mthwakazi |

Commanders and leaders
| Cecil Rhodes; Leander Starr Jameson; Allan Wilson †; Patrick William Forbes; Khama III; Henry Borrow † | Lobengula †; Mjaan; Manonda † |

Strength
| Total: 1,760; 750 Company troops 1,000 Tswana; 5 Maxim guns 3 other rapid-fire guns 2 cannons | Total: 100,000; 80,000 spearmen 20,000 riflemen |

Casualties and losses
| c. 100 | 4,400—4,500 killed |

The First Matabele War was fought between 1893 and 1894 in modern-day Zimbabwe. It pitted the British South Africa Company against the Ndebele kingdom of Mthwakazi. Lobengula, king of Mthwakazi, had tried to avoid outright war with the company's pioneers because he and his advisors were mindful of the destructive power of European-produced weapons on traditional Matabele impis (units of warriors) attacking in massed ranks. Lobengula reportedly could muster 80,000 spearmen and 20,000 riflemen, armed with Martini-Henry rifles, which were modern arms at that time. However, poor training may have resulted in the weapons not being used effectively.

The British South Africa Company had no more than 750 troops in the British South Africa Company's Police, with an undetermined number of possible colonial volunteers and an additional 700 Tswana (Bechuana) allies. Cecil Rhodes, who was Prime Minister of the Cape Colony, and Leander Starr Jameson, the Administrator of Mashonaland, also tried to avoid war to prevent loss of confidence in the future of the territory. Matters came to a head when Lobengula approved a raid to forcibly extract tribute from a Mashona chief in the district of the town of Fort Victoria, which inevitably led to a clash with the company.

== Events leading to war ==
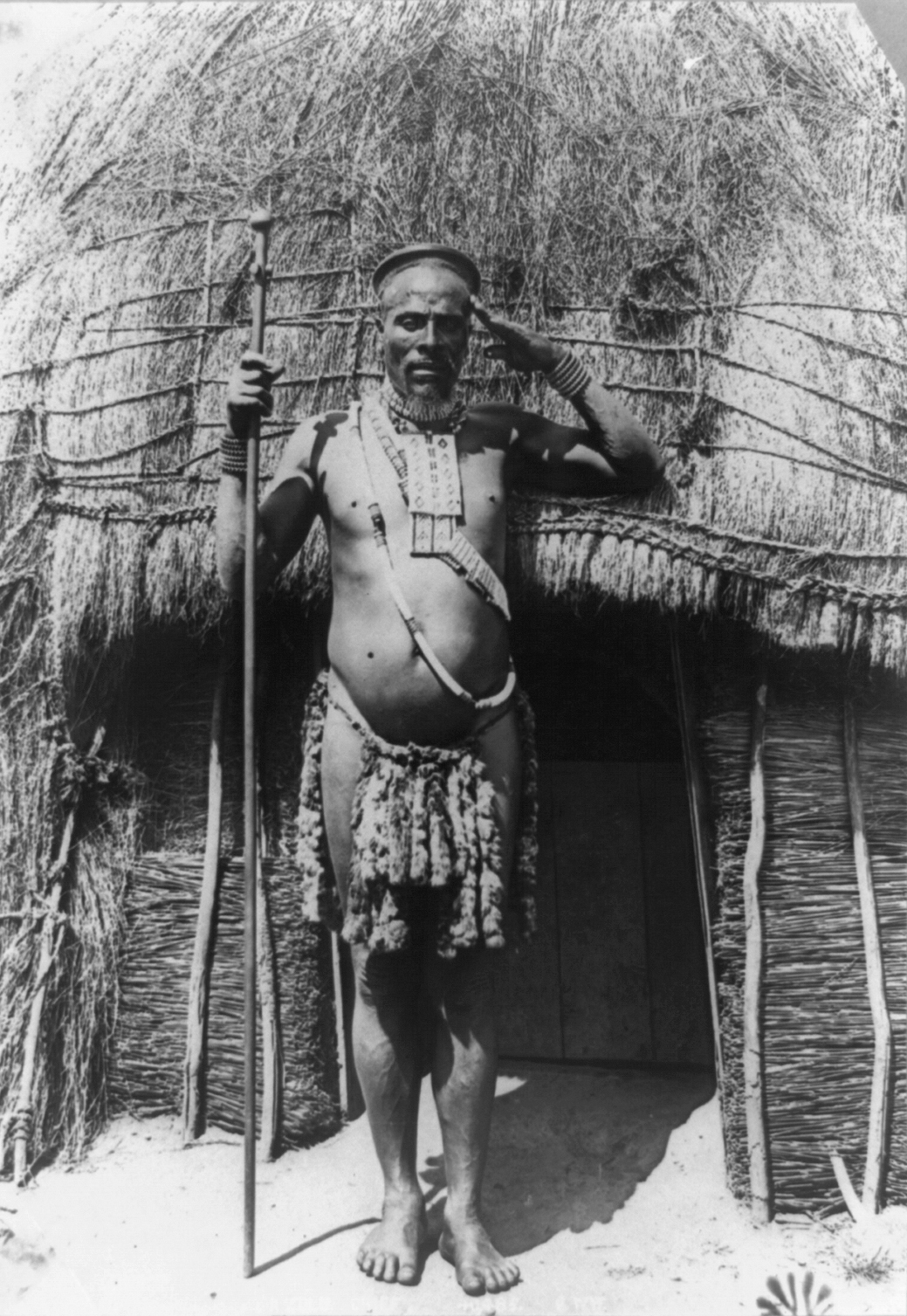
An inhabitant of Bulawayo, pictured in 1890

The British government agreed that the British South Africa Company would administer the territory stretching from the Limpopo to the Zambezi under royal charter. Queen Victoria signed the charter in 1889. Cecil Rhodes used this document in 1890 to justify sending the Pioneer Column, a group of settlers protected by well-armed British South Africa Company's Police (BSAP) and guided by the big game hunter Frederick Selous, through Matabeleland and into Shona territory to establish Fort Salisbury (now Harare).

Throughout 1891 and 1892, Lobengula ensured that his raiding parties were directed away from their main target areas of Mashonaland and so precluded possible clashes between his zealous young commanders and the white settlers. However, in 1893, a chief in the Victoria district named Gomara refused tribute, asserting that he was now under the protection of the laws of the settlers. In order to save face, Lobengula was impelled to send a raiding party of several thousand warriors to bring his vassal to heel. The raiding party destroyed several villages and murdered many of the inhabitants. (In this they were more restrained than usual as they generally abducted the suitably aged young men and women and killed everyone else.) However, the local British South Africa Company administration felt that they had to intervene to avoid losing the confidence of the local people who complained that they were not being given any support against the raid. As a result, the Company officials demanded from the raiders that they leave immediately. The Ndebele refused and in the hostilities that developed the Ndebele sustained about 40 casualties; this led to their withdrawal. King Lobengula had given stern warning to his fighters when they started the raid. "If you shed one drop of the white man's blood on this raid into Mashonaland, I will have every one of you killed when you return".

== Start of the war ==
There was a delay of just over two months (August to October) while Jameson corresponded with Rhodes in Cape Town and considered how to amass enough troops to undertake an invasion of Matabeleland.

BSAP columns rode from Fort Salisbury and Fort Victoria, and combined at Iron Mine Hill, around the centre point of the country, on 16 October 1893. Together the force totalled about 700 men, commanded by Major Patrick Forbes and equipped with five Maxim machine guns. Forbes' combined column moved on the Matabele king's capital at Bulawayo, to the south-west. An additional force of 700 Bechuanas marched on Bulawayo from the south under Khama III, the most influential of the Bamangwato chiefs, and a staunch ally of the British. The Matabele army mobilised to prevent Forbes from reaching the city, and twice engaged the column as it approached: on 25 October, 3,500 warriors assaulted the column near the Shangani River. Lobengula's troops were well-drilled and formidable by pre-colonial African standards, but the pioneers' Maxim guns, which had never before been used in battle, far exceeded expectations, according to an eyewitness "mow[ing] them down literally like grass". By the time the Matabele withdrew, they had suffered around 1,500 fatalities; the BSAP, on the other hand, had lost only four men.

A week later, on 1 November, 2,000 Matabele riflemen and 4,000 warriors attacked Forbes at Bembesi, about 50 kilometres (30 mi) north-east of Bulawayo, but again they were no match for the crushing firepower of the major's Maxims: about 2,500 more Matabele were killed. Lobengula fled Bulawayo as soon as he heard the news from Bembesi; in keeping with traditional custom, he and his subjects torched the royal town as they went. In the resultant conflagration, the city's large store of ivory, gold and other treasure was destroyed, and its ammunition magazine exploded. The flames were still rising when the British marched into the settlement the next day; they set up base in the "White Man's Camp" already present, and nailed the company flag and the Union Jack to a tree. The reconstruction of Bulawayo began almost as soon as the fires were out, with a new Company-run city rising atop the ruins of Lobengula's former residence.

== Destruction of Bulawayo ==
The column of Khama's men from the south had reached the Tati River, and won a victory on the Singuesi river on 2 November. Advanced scouts for the colonial forces, including Burnham and Selous, reached Bulawayo that same day, only to watch as Lobengula blew up his arsenal of ammunition rather than allow it to be captured by the company. The town, mostly made up of wood-beam huts with mud (dagga) walls, was largely destroyed. On 3 November, Bulawayo was reached by the Victoria column from Mashonaland, accompanied by Jameson and Sir John Willoughby. By this time, Lobengula and his warriors were in full flight towards the Zambezi. An attempt was made to induce Lobengula to surrender, but no replies were received to the messages. The United Salisbury Column later arrived in Bulawayo, and on 13 November, Major Patrick Forbes organized his column and started in pursuit of Lobengula.

== Shangani Patrol ==
The pursuing party was delayed by difficult routes and heavy rains, and did not catch up with Lobengula until December 3. Major Allan Wilson, in command of thirty-four troopers known as the Shangani Patrol, crossed the Shangani river and bivouacked close to Lobengula's quarters. In the night the river rose, and early the next morning the Matabele surrounded the Shangani Patrol, overwhelming Wilson and his followers. 34 men of the Shangani Patrol perished in the encounter, while the remaining three (American scouts Frederick Russell Burnham and Pearl "Pete" Ingram, and an Australian named Gooding) crossed the swollen river under orders from Wilson, and returned to Forbes to request reinforcements. However, Forbes' forces were unable to cross the river in time.

== Defeat of the Matabele ==
=== Death of Lobengula, and submission of the izinDuna ===
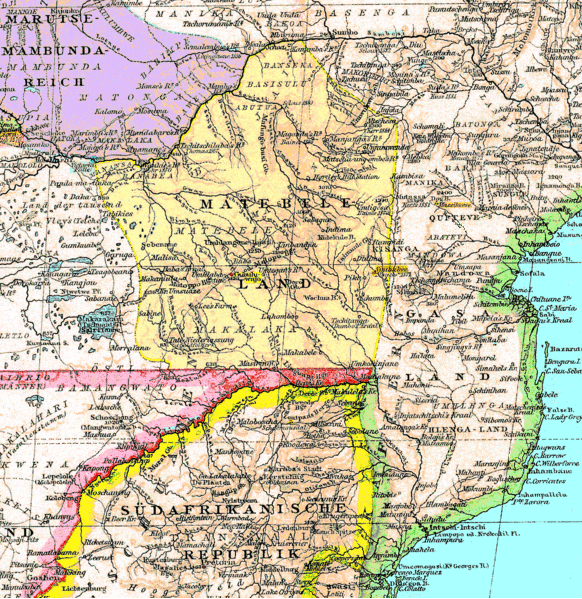
Matabeleland, 1887

Lobengula died from smallpox on January 22 or 23, 1894. Meanwhile, the Ndebele warriors gradually succumbed to the company's superior firepower. Soon after the king's death, the Ndebele izinDuna submitted to the British South Africa Company. Charges were later made in the British House of Commons against the company, accusing them of having provoked the Ndebele in order to secure their territory. However, after enquiry the company was exonerated from the charge by Lord Ripon, the Colonial Secretary.

=== Lobengula's box of sovereigns ===
Following the end of the war, one of Lobengula's izinDuna said that just before Forbes' column had reached the Shangani on 3 December 1893, the king had attempted to buy the pioneers off. According to this story, two Matabele messengers, Petchan and Sehuloholu, had been given a box of gold sovereigns, and instructed to intercept the column before it reached the river. They were to tell the white people that the king admitted defeat, and offered this money in tribute if the BSAP would turn back. "Gold is the only thing that will stop the white men," Lobengula reportedly said. Petchan and Sehuloholu reportedly reached the column on 2 December 1893, and gave the money and the message to two men in the rear guard. No man who had been attached to the column confirmed this, but company authorities thought it unlikely that the Matabele would simply invent such a story. Two officers' batmen were accused of accepting the gold, then keeping it for themselves and not passing on the message. The evidence against them was inconclusive, but they were found guilty and sentenced to 14 years' hard labour by the Resident Magistrate. They were released after two years, however, because the maximum term the Magistrate could give was three months; the convictions were ultimately quashed altogether on a re-assessment of the evidence by the High Commissioner's legal team. The truth of the matter has never been conclusively resolved.

== Aftermath ==
In every step taken by the company, the guiding hand was that of Cecil Rhodes, a fact which received recognition when the company's territory officially received the name "Rhodesia" on May 3, 1895. During this year there was great activity in exploiting Matabeleland, with "Stands" or plots being sold at extraordinary prices in Bulawayo. Within nine months the rebuilt town of Bulawayo had a population of 1,900 colonials with over 2,000 more prospectors in the various goldfields. A new company, the African Transcontinental Company, was founded under the auspices of Col. Frank Rhodes, brother of Cecil, with the ultimate purpose of connecting the Cape with Cairo. The railway from Cape Town passed Mafeking, and approached the Rhodesian frontier, reaching Bulawayo in 1897. The east coast line to connect Salisbury (now Harare) with Beira, Mozambique (then Portuguese East Africa Colony) was completed in 1899.

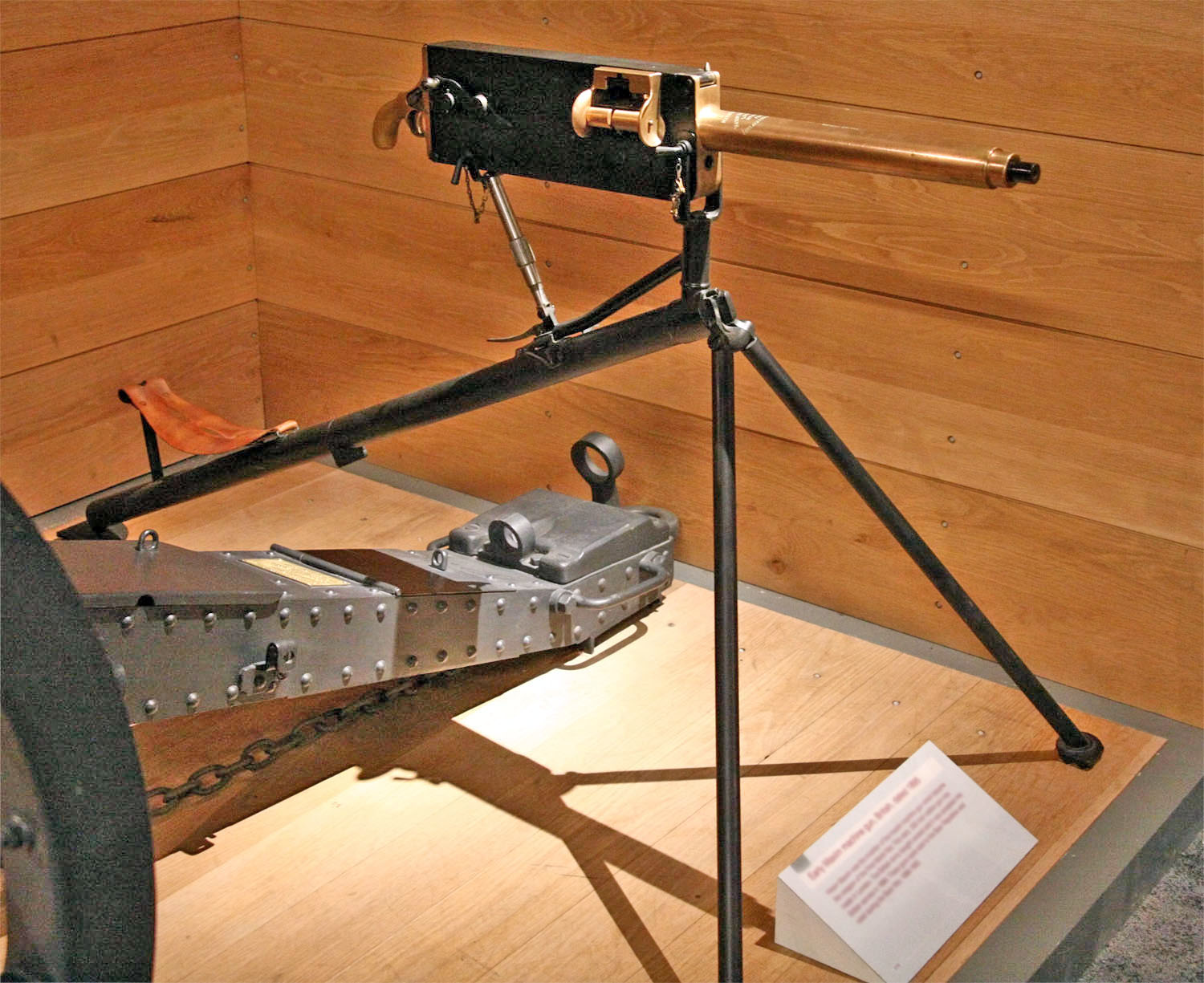
Maxim gun, 1895 vintage

== Maxim gun ==
The First Matabele War was the first wartime use of a Maxim gun by Britain and it proved to have a decisive impact. In less than optimal situations, such as hilly or mountainous terrain or dense vegetation with poor lines of sight, the Maxim gun resulted in little direct impact on enemy deaths. But as a psychological weapon, the Maxim gun was effective. It generated a sense of fear in the Ndebele and made the British South Africa Police seem invincible. In one engagement, for example, 50 company soldiers with four Maxim guns fought off 5,000 Ndebele warriors.

== See also ==
- Second Matabele War

== Notes and references ==
Notes

Journal articles

- "1893 Sequence of Events; The Wilson (Shangani) Patrol" (PDF). Centenary of the Matabele War of 1893. Harare: Mashonaland Branch of the History Society of Zimbabwe. 25–26 September 1993. Archived from the original (PDF) on 30 January 2021.
- Ransford, O. N. (July 1968). "'White Man's Camp', Bulawayo". Rhodesiana (18). Salisbury: The Rhodesiana Society: 13–21.

Bibliography

- Burnham, Frederick Russell (2016). Scouting on Two Continents. Normanby Press. ISBN 978-1-78625-958-5.
- Cary, Robert (1968). A Time to Die. Cape Town: Howard Timmins.
- Ferguson, Niall (April 2004). Empire: the rise and demise of the British world order and the lessons for global power. New York: Basic Books. ISBN 978-0465023295.
- Gale, W. D. (1958). Zambezi Sunrise: How Civilisation Came to Rhodesia and Nyasaland. Cape Town: Howard Timmins.
- Hopkins, Donald R. (September 2002) [1983]. The Greatest Killer: Smallpox in History. Chicago, Illinois: University of Chicago Press. ISBN 978-0-226-35168-1.
- Knight, Ian (July 1989). Queen Victoria's Enemies: Southern Africa. Oxford: Osprey Publishing. ISBN 978-0-85045-901-2.
- Knight-Bruce, George Wyndham (1892). Journals of the Mashonaland Mission 1888 to 1892. Society for the Propagation of the Gospel in Foreign Parts.
- Marshall Hole, Hugh (1926). The Making of Rhodesia. London: Macmillan Publishers.
- Oliver, Roland Anthony (1985). The Cambridge history of Africa. Vol. 6 : From 1870 to 1905. Cambridge: University Press. ISBN 9780512228031.
- Pakenham, Thomas (1991). The Scramble For Africa: White Man's Conquest of the Dark Continent from 1876 to 1912. New York: HarperCollins. ISBN 0-380-71999-1.
- Panton, Kenneth J. (2015). Historical Dictionary of the British Empire. London: Rowman & Littlefield. ISBN 978-0810878013.
- Ranger, Terence O. (September 2010). Bulawayo Burning: The Social History of a Southern African City, 1893–1960. Oxford: James Currey. ISBN 978-1847010209.
