= Ndebele =

Ndebele or AmaNdebele may refer to:

- Northern Ndebele people, an ethnic group native to Zimbabwe
  - Northern Ndebele language
- Southern Ndebele people, a Bantu ethnic group native to Southern Africa
  - Southern Ndebele language
  - Sumayela Ndebele language

== See also ==
- Matabele (disambiguation)
