= Maxim M1895 =

Extra Light Rifle Calibre Maxim
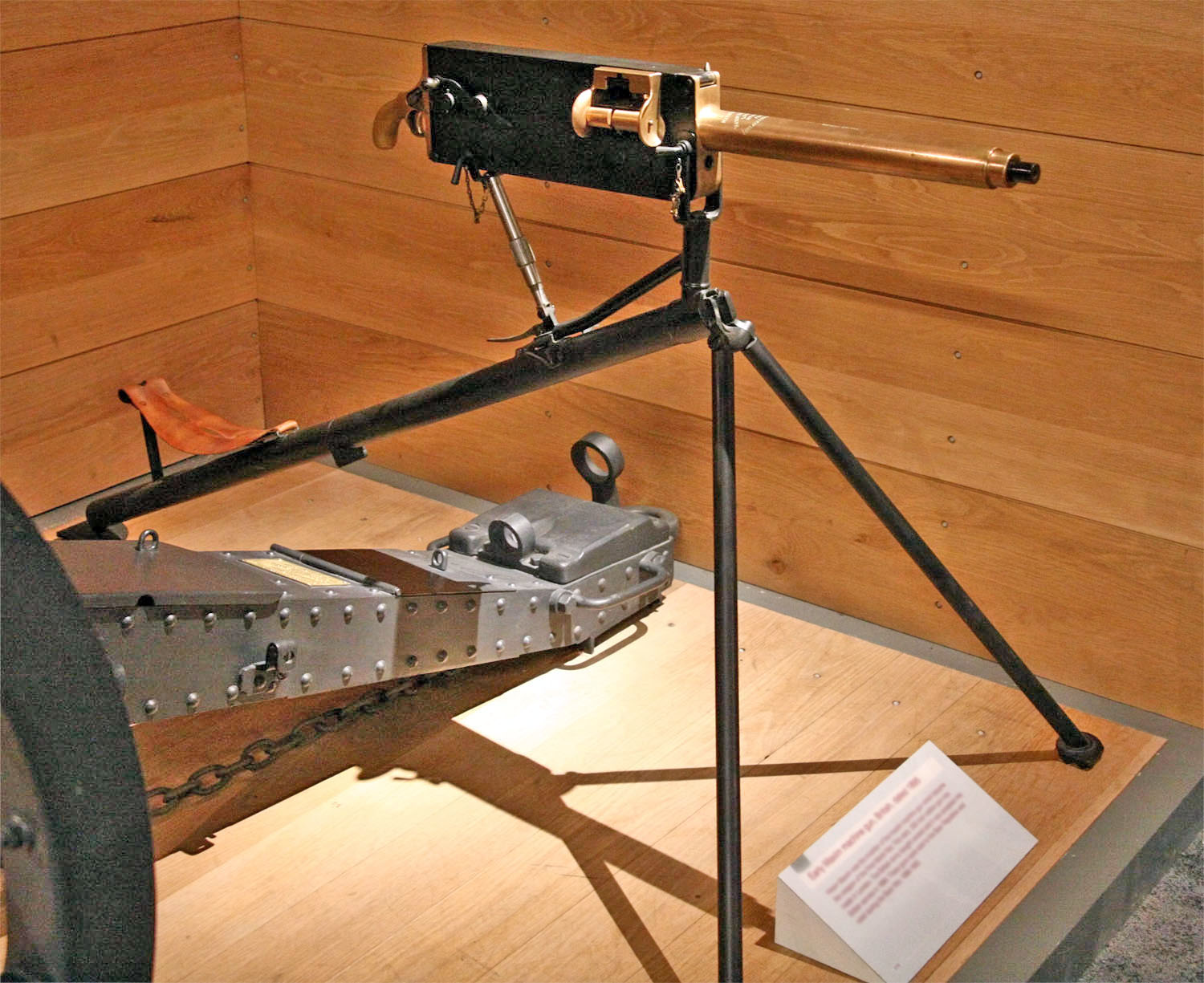
- Air-cooled, Extra Light Maxim M1895.
- Type: Medium machine gun
- Place of origin: United Kingdom

Service history
- In service: 1895–1900
- Wars: Mahdist War; Emin Pasha Relief Expedition; First Matabele War; Fourth Anglo-Ashanti War; Jameson Raid; Second Matabele War; Dervish Resistance

Production history
- Designer: Sir Hiram Stevens Maxim
- Manufacturer: Maxim Gun Company, Vickers
- No. built: 135

Specifications
- Mass: 12.2 kg (27 lb)/20.2 kg (44.5 lb) with tripod
- Crew: 1
- Caliber: .303 British
- Action: Recoil-operated
- Rate of fire: 400 rounds/min
- Muzzle velocity: 744 m/s
- Feed system: 250-round canvas belt
- Sights: Iron sights

Extra Light Rifle Calibre Maxim, designed in 1895, was an early medium machine gun.

== Background ==
=== Maxim heavy machine gun ===
In 1884 American inventor Hiram Maxim designed the first fully automatic weapon in the world - Maxim machine gun. The perfected version of this weapon entered the mass production after 1888, when Hiram Maxim entered into a partnership with Vickers, a British arms manufacturer. Operating on the recoil principle, with water cooling, it was very fast, but somewhat heavy and cumbersome weapon. The weight of the Maxim M1889 gun was some 60 pounds (27 kg), but it had to be mounted on a heavy tripod (some 49 pounds-22 kg itself) to carry its weight and absorb the force of the recoil. With about 8 pounds (1.8 kg) of water that had to be loaded in the cylindrical brass reservoir around the gun barrel (for cooling the barrel), the total weight of an operating Maxim gun was about 117 pounds (53 kg). Such a heavy weapon required a crew of at least four men to carry and assemble on the battlefield, which limited its mobility. In spite of this limitations, the Maxim gun soon became popular due to its extreme firepower (600 rounds a minute, equal to 60 riflemen at the time) and by 1890 Maxim and Vickers company was supplying machine guns to British Empire, Germany, Austria-Hungary, Italy, Switzerland, and Russia.

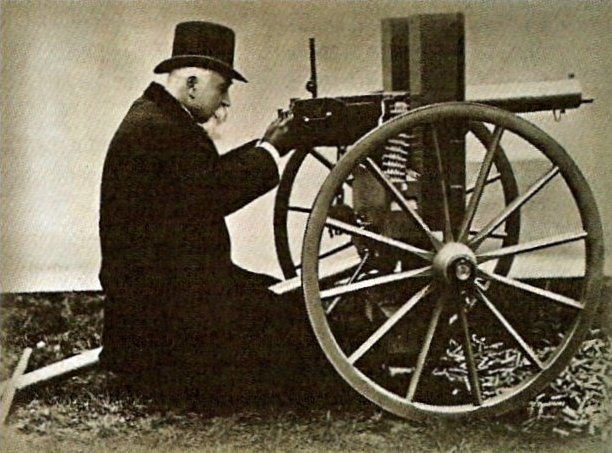
Hiram Maxim firing the first model of his machine gun mounted on an artillery carriage (1884).

=== Colt Model 1895 light machine gun ===
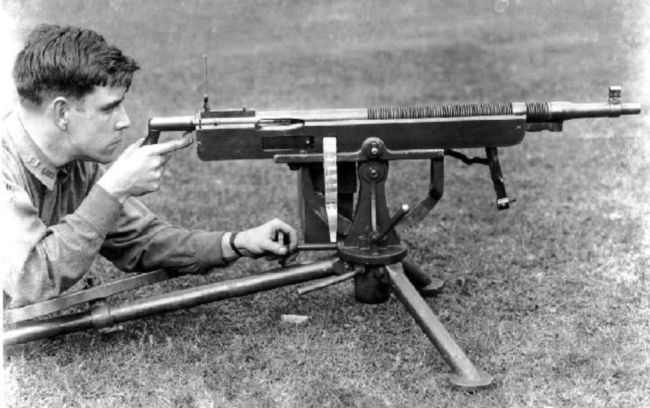
Colt-Browning M1895 light machine gun.

However, in 1890 another American inventor, John Browning, designed much lighter and more portable, gas operated machine gun and offered it to the Colt's Manufacturing Company. The gun itself weighted only 40 pounds (18 kg), but it also required a tripod of the similar weight to be fired. It entered the mass production as the Colt-Browning M1895, and was adopted by the US navy in 1895.

== Extra Light Maxim ==
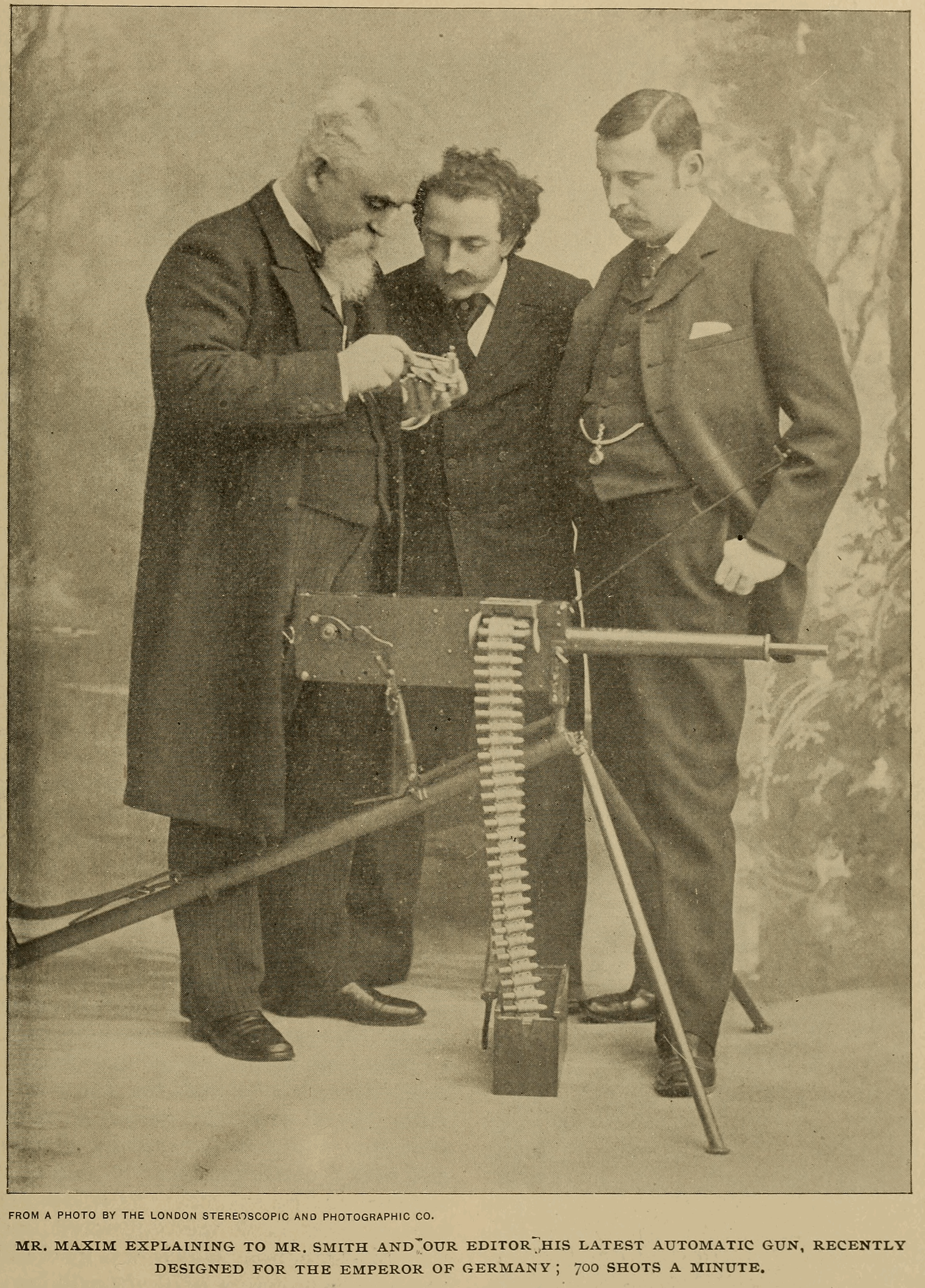
Sir Hiram Maxim showing his Extra Light gun in Germany in April 1895.

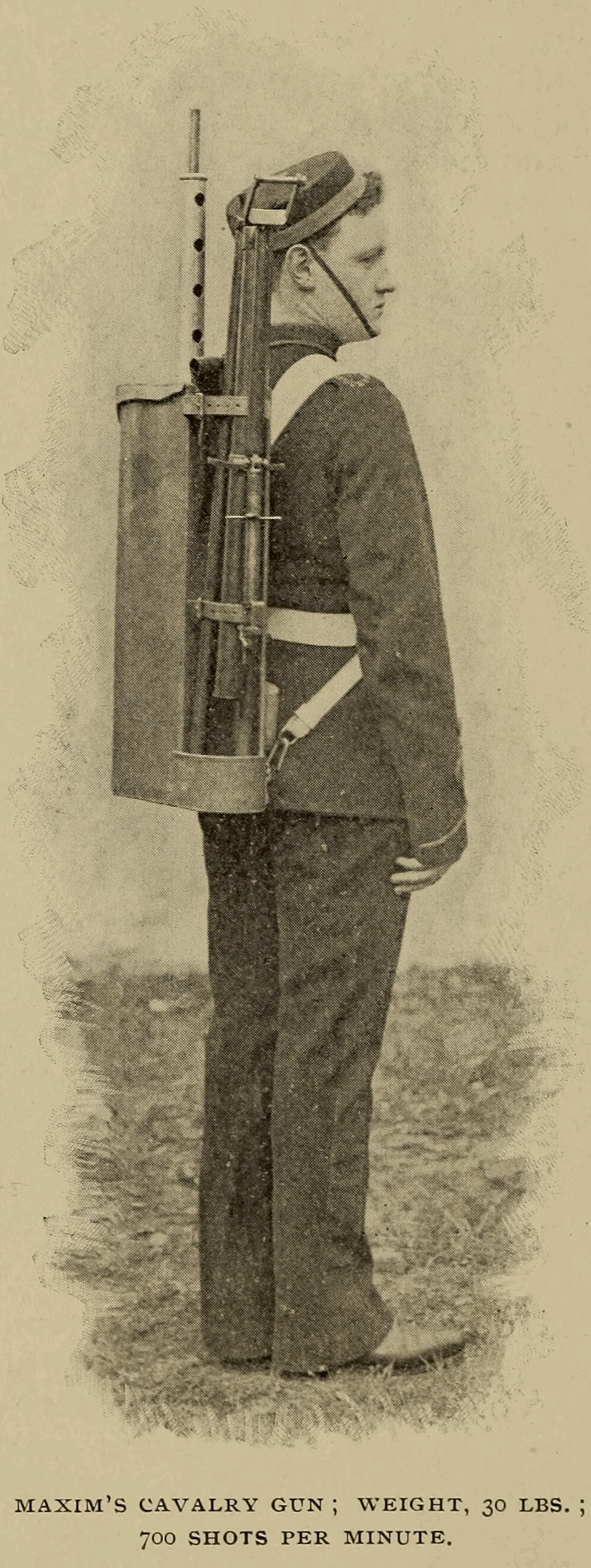
Maxim M1895 cavalry gun, complete with a detached tripod carried on the back of a single soldier. With a mass of only 44.5 pounds (20 kg), it was the only complete machine gun at the time that could be carried by one man.

In 1895, in response to the interest shown in the 40 pounds, air-cooled Colt-Browning M1895 (Potato Digger) in the U.S. machine gun trials, Hiram Maxim introduced his own air-cooled Extra Light gun weighing only 27 pounds (12,2 kg) alone and 44.5 pounds (20.2 kg) complete with tripod. It was the first air-cooled Maxim gun, and the first with the mainspring inside the receiver casing. At the time, it was the lightest machine gun in the world.

Maxim hoped that cavalry units would appreciate the Extra Light gun for “hit and run” raids, for its light weight. Indeed, the U.S. trials Board commented quite favorably on the portability of the Extra Light Maxim. However, as the air-cooling mechanics was not very well understood at the time, the thick brass jacket that covered the barrel had only four cooling holes in its bottom, and the gun overheated very quickly. Maxim himself estimated that no more than 400 rounds could be fired from it at one time, before a pause for cooling had to be made.

=== Reception ===
However, despite an extensive promotional campaign conducted by Hiram Maxim himself, the 1895 Extra Light gun was a commercial failure and only 135 were built, many of these being sold out singly or in pairs for tests in various countries.

== Literature ==
- Goldsmith, Dolf (2002). The Devil's Paintbrushː Sir Hiram Maxim's Gun. Cobourg, Ontario, Canada: Collector Grade Publications. ISBN 0-88935-282-8.
- Willbanks, James H. (2004). Machine gunsː An illustrated history of their impact. Oxford, England: ABC-CLIO. ISBN 1-85109-485-7.

== External Sources ==
- Hiram's Extra Light Maxim Gun
- "Introducing the Extra-Light Maxim: A Revolutionary Lightweight Machine Gun"
