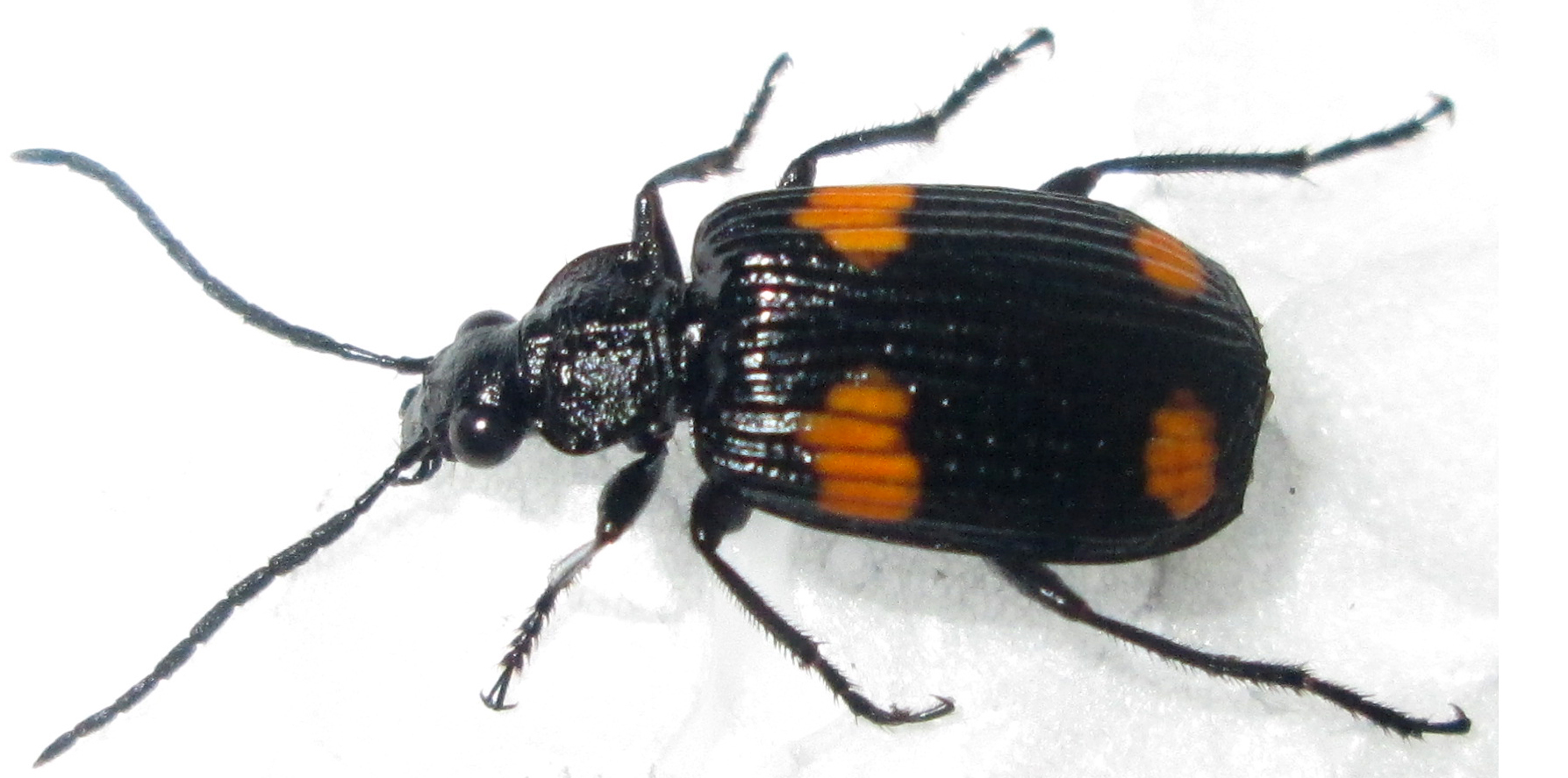
- Matabele miranda, Botswana

Scientific classification
- Kingdom: Animalia
- Phylum: Arthropoda
- Clade: Pancrustacea
- Class: Insecta
- Order: Coleoptera
- Suborder: Adephaga
- Family: Carabidae
- Subfamily: Lebiinae
- Tribe: Lebiini
- Subtribe: Lebiina
- Genus: Matabele; Péringuey, 1896

Synonyms
- Diacoptodera Alluaud, 1932

= Matabele (beetle) =

Genus of beetles

Matabele is a genus of Carabid Beetles in the beetle family Carabidae. There are at least two described species in Matabele.

== Species ==
These two species belong to the genus Matabele:

- Matabele arabica Mateu, 1986 (Saudi Arabia)
- Matabele miranda Péringuey, 1896 (Afrotropics)
