= Bembezi =

- Location within Zimbabwe
- Coordinates: 20°00′S 28°56′E
- Country: Zimbabwe
- Province: Matabeleland North
- Time zone: UTC+2 (CAT)

Bembezi is a small town in Matabeleland North, Zimbabwe and is located about 43 km north-east of Bulawayo.

== History ==
The Battle of Bembezi took place nearby on 1 November 1893.
