= Rhodes (TV series) =

- Also known as: The Life and Legend of Cecil Rhodes
- Genre: Drama
- Written by: Antony Thomas
- Directed by: David Drury
- Starring: Martin Shaw; Frances Barber; Neil Pearson; Philip Godawa; Frantz Dobrowsky; Joe Shaw
- Theme music composer: Alan Parker
- Country of origin: United Kingdom
- Original language: English
- No. of series: 1
- No. of episodes: 8

Production
- Executive producers: Rebecca Eaton; Anthony Thomas; Michael Wearing
- Producers: Scott Meek; Charles Salmon
- Cinematography: Alec Curtis
- Running time: 467 minutes
- Production companies: WGBH Boston; Zenith Entertainment in association with Canadian Broadcasting Corporation and South African Broadcasting Corporation for BBC

Original release
- Network: BBC1
- Release: 15 September – 3 November 1996

Rhodes is an eight-part British television drama series about the life of Cecil Rhodes, a 19th century British adventurer, empire-builder and politician. It starred Martin Shaw as Rhodes, and was written by Antony Thomas. Rhodes received its British television debut on 15 September 1996, and concluded on 3 November. It was produced by Scott Meek and Charles Salmon, and directed by David Drury.

== Background ==
At the time of its production, Rhodes was the most expensive project ever undertaken by a British television broadcaster, costing £10 million to make, and was seen as a huge gamble by the BBC. In addition, development, filming and production took a decade to complete, and the series employed over 10,000 extras. Forming part of BBC1's Autumn 1996 television programming, its opening episode was preceded by a high-profile publicity campaign. However, it quickly began to attract relatively poor viewing figures. Although 7.6 million tuned in for the first episode, by the following week viewing figures had fallen to 4.8 million. The series was also quickly panned by critics.

On 26 September 1996, a report by The Independent's Marianne MacDonald suggested one of the series' biggest issues was that it assumed its viewers would already have a prior knowledge of Cecil Rhodes' life and achievements, something which it turned out many of those watching it did not possess. In response to these concerns, the BBC produced a 32-page booklet to accompany the series that provided some background details about Rhodes, and which could be purchased for £4.99. However, copies of this book would not be available until at least four weeks into the series, by which time MacDonald felt that many viewers would have given up on it.

Following the 2000 adaptation of Gormenghast, Mervyn Peake's series of fantasy novels, which also proved to be unsuccessful with viewers and critics, Rhodes was included in a list of notable British television flops compiled by The Guardian.

== Cast ==
- Martin Shaw as Cecil John Rhodes
- Joe Shaw as Young Cecil Rhodes
- Ken Stott as Barney Barnato
- Frances Barber as Princess Catherine Radziwill
- Neil Pearson as Leander Starr Jameson
- Oliver Cotton as Joseph Chamberlain
- Ron Smerczak as Edward Arthur Maund
- Frantz Dobrowsky as Alfred Beit
- Alex Ferns as John Grimmer
- Jeremy Crutchley as Philip Jourdan
- André Odendaal as Gordon Le Sueur
- Patrick Shai as Christmas
- Tim Dutton as Herbert Rhodes
- David Butler as Charles Rudd
- Paul Slabolepzi as Frederick Selous
- Philip Godawa as John X. Merriman
- Owen Dell as Robert Coryndon
- Nicky Rebelo as Solomon Joel
- Margaret Heale as Queen Victoria
- Rex Garner as Henry Loch
- Washington Xisolo as Lobengula
- Carel Trichardt as Paul Kruger
- Michael Richard as Sidney Shippard
- John Rogers as Sir Richard Southey
- Ian Roberts as Johannes Wilhelm Colenbrander
- Richard Huw as Rochfort Maguire
- Antony Thomas as Henry Labouchère
- Raymond Coulthard as Neville Pickering
- Paul Ditchfield as John Currey
- Gresby Nash as Harry Currey
- Anthony Descombes as Young Harry Currey
- Deon Stewardson as Australian Digger

== Synopsis ==
The series tells the story of Rhodes' life through a series of flashbacks of conversations between him and Princess Catherine Radziwiłł, and also between her and people who knew him. It also shows the story of how she stalked and eventually ruined him. In the serial, Cecil Rhodes is played by Martin Shaw, the younger Cecil Rhodes is played by his son Joe Shaw, and Princess Radziwiłł is played by Frances Barber. In the serial Rhodes is portrayed as ruthless and greedy. The serial also suggests that he was homosexual.

== Criticism ==
Because of the dramatic slide in ratings, Rhodes was quickly deemed to have been a failure, prompting MacDonald to observe that the series was 'in danger of becoming a flop as colossal as its hero's exploits'. It was also quickly rounded on by a number of critics, who were equally as scathing. Writing for The Sunday Times, A. A. Gill suggested it 'started with everything against it and then they made it all worse', while David Aaronovitch of The Independent on Sunday criticized the overuse of background music, observing 'the BBC's Rhodes is a man who cannot take a leak without the assistance of the Berlin Philharmonic'.

However, despite the series' troubles the BBC were hopeful that it would enjoy more success internationally: A spokeswoman for BBC Worldwide said of Rhodes: 'It's obviously very disappointing about the ratings but it doesn't really affect international sales. Overseas broadcasters...tend not to go on what critics say here.'

== Media releases ==
The complete series of Rhodes was released on VHS in 1997. It was subsequently released on DVD by Acorn Media UK on 3 March 2008. A book by Antony Thomas, Rhodes, was published in 1996 by BBC Books (ISBN 978-0-563-38742-8).
