= Henry Currey =

Henry Currey may refer to:

- Henry Currey (architect) (1820–1900), English architect and surveyor
- Henry Latham Currey (1863–1945), Member of the Cape House of Assembly and then of the House of Assembly of South Africa
