= Joe Shaw (actor) =

English actor, director and filmmaker (born 1972)

- Born: Joseph Nicholas Shaw; 15 November 1972 (age 53); Islington, London, England
- Occupations: Actor; director; filmmaker
- Years active: 1996–2010 (as actor); 2010– (as director, filmmaker)
- Father: Martin Shaw

Joseph Nicholas Shaw (born 15 November 1972) is an English former actor, turned director and filmmaker. He began his career as an actor, best known for his roles as Dominic McCallister in Bad Girls and DC Scott Granger in Murder Investigation Team. Since 2010, he has worked as a director and filmmaker.

== Life and career ==
Joseph Nicholas Shaw was born in Islington, London. He is the son of actor Martin Shaw and his wife Jill (née Allen), his siblings are also actors. He trained at the London Academy of Music and Dramatic Art but left in 1996 to play the role of a young Cecil Rhodes in Rhodes. He went on to appear in films such as Kull the Conqueror and The House of Angelo before landing the role of prison officer Dominic McCallister in the ITV drama Bad Girls in 1999 and appeared in two series. He also appeared in Urban Gothic and The Inspector Lynley Mysteries. In 2003, Shaw played DC Scott Granger in the first series of Murder Investigation Team. In the late 2000s, Shaw had roles in Judge John Deed and Casualty but retired from acting in 2010 to become a director.

As a director and filmmaker he has directed TV advertisements for Lego and Next.

== Filmography ==
Year	Title	Role	Notes
1996	Rhodes	Young Cecil Rhodes	Episode: "All the World's Diamonds"
1997	Kull the Conqueror	Dalgar	Film
1997	The House of Angelo	Octavius	Film
1997	Tangier Cop	Eric Burns	Film
1999	Junk	Jerry	Television film
1999–2000	Bad Girls	Dominic McCallister	Main role
2000	Urban Gothic	Joel	Episode: "The One Where"
2003	The Inspector Lynley Mysteries	Theo Shaw	Episode: "Deception on His Mind"
2003	Murder Investigation Team	DC Scott Granger	Regular role
2003	Shoreditch	William Nichols	Film
2007	Judge John Deed	Ian McCartney	2 episodes
2008	Casualty	Pete Hartle	Episode: "Take It Back"
2010	Made in Romania	Sebastian Grove	Film
