= Steel River Blues =

2004 British television drama series

- Title card
- Genre: Drama
- Created by: Patrick Harbinson
- Directed by: Tim Dowd; Graeme Harper
- Starring: Daniel Ainsleigh; Satnam Bhogal; John Bowler; Clare Buckfield; Mark Cameron; Daniel Casey; Charles Dale; Joanne Farrell
- Opening theme: "Steel River Blues" by Chris Rea
- Country of origin: United Kingdom
- Original language: English
- No. of series: 1
- No. of episodes: 7

Production
- Executive producer: Keith Richardson
- Producer: Ken Horn
- Cinematography: Geoff Healey
- Editor: Terry Warwick
- Running time: 60–90 minutes
- Production company: Yorkshire Television

Original release
- Network: ITV
- Release: 1 September – 13 October 2004

Steel River Blues is a British television drama series, created by Patrick Harbinson, that was first broadcast in September 2004 on ITV. Produced by Ken Horn, the series follows the working and private lives of a group of firefighters, known as Blue Watch, who are based in Middlesbrough. Critics were quick to dub the series "Middlesbrough's Burning" or "Teesside's Burning", after the popular fire-fighting drama that preceded it, London's Burning, yet there were very few similarities between the two, apart from them being about the business of firefighting.

Like its predecessor, Steel River Blues was an ensemble drama without any single starring part, though perhaps the best-known actor was Daniel Casey, who was previously a co-star in Midsomer Murders. Other stars included Joanne Farrell, Stuart Graham, Daniel Ainsleigh and Satnam Bhogal. The series title music was an original composition performed by Middlesbrough-born singer-songwriter Chris Rea. The series was filmed in both Teesside and Leeds.

It was announced in January 2005 that the series would not be recommissioned due to low viewing figures. Subsequently, the series has never been released on DVD.

== Cast ==
- Daniel Ainsleigh – Firefighter Jeremy Lloyd
- Satnam Bhogal – Firefighter Sunil Gupta
- Mark Cameron – Firefighter Roger Hibbot
- Daniel Casey – Leading Firefighter Tony Barnes
- Charles Dale – Firefighter George Barnes
- Joanne Farrell – Firefighter Nicky Higgins
- Nitin Kundra – Firefighter Asif Hussain
- Michael Nardone – Firefighter Dave Tanner
- Daniel Ryan – Firefighter Andy Coulson
- Kelly Wenham – Probationary Firefighter Julie Priestley
- John Bowler – Divisional Commander Mick Hammond
- Stuart Graham – Station Officer Bill McGlinchy
- Steven Hillman – Sub Officer Alan Priestley
- Clare Buckfield – LCRO Katy Bell
- Victoria Hawkins – CRO Sandra Harris
- Sarah Preston – Belinda Moss

== Episodes ==
No.	Title	Directed by	Written by	Original release date	UK viewers (millions)
1	"Steel River"	Tim Dowd	Patrick Harbinson	1 September 2004	6.78
Extended episode. New station officer Bill McGlinchy arrives in Teesside and starts to make his mark on Middlesbrough Fire Station's Blue Watch. Control room operator Julie Priestley passes her firefighter training in the hope she can follow in her father's footsteps, but someone is standing in the way of her fulfilling her dream job.
2	"Bloody Fridays"	Tim Dowd	Charlie Fletcher	8 September 2004	4.81
It's Friday night and it's a busy one for Blue Watch. Their first call is to some nuns trapped in a lift, but all is not as it seems. Julie gets more than she bargained for when she goes on the search for a stripper's missing python.
3	"Family Fortunes"	Graeme Harper	Alan Whiting	15 September 2004	4.74
Jeremy brings his troubles to work after finding out his girlfriend has been having an affair. Blue Watch attend an industrial accident and have to think quickly in order to rescue a trapped worker. Unsettling discoveries cause personal and professional problems on the moors.
4	"What Goes Around"	Graeme Harper	Patrick Harbinson	22 September 2004	5.29
The crew are targeted by an act of vandalism, and tragedy strikes when George Barnes has a dramatic experience on his way to an emergency scene. Bill receives visitors from his past.
5	"Blind Man's Buff"	Graeme Harper	Alan Whiting	29 September 2004	N/A
New firefighter Nicky Higgins arrives to replace injured George, and makes quite an impression on her new colleagues. Tony tries to find out who is responsible for his brother's injury. Andy and Dave have personal crises that they must each deal with in their own unique ways.
6	"Flashpoint"	Tim Dowd	Patrick Melanaphy	6 October 2004	4.77
As George struggles to come to terms with his injury, Blue Watch are called to a fire on a packed boat. Nicky faces hostility from Tony and decides to confront him. A harrowing experience at a steel works forces Sunill to face personal demons. But will it cost him his life?
7	"The Long Drop"	Tim Dowd	Charlie Fletcher	13 October 2004	4.88
Bill & Tony call an uneasy truce. George receives bad news and takes drastic action. Will Tony and the rest of Blue Watch save the depressed George? Or will they be too late?

== See also ==
- The Smoke
- Chicago Fire
- Rescue Me
- London's Burning
