= Charles Rudd (cricketer) =

South-African born English cricketer (1873–1950)

Charles John Lockhart Rudd (12 March 1873 – 1 April 1950) was a Cape Colony–born English cricketer who played first-class cricket in one match in 1894 for Cambridge University. He was born in Cape Town, South Africa, and died at Kingston-upon-Thames, Surrey, England.

Rudd was the son of Charles Dunell Rudd, the associate of Cecil Rhodes and an extremely wealthy prospector and entrepreneur whose business fortune had dubiously legal foundations in pre-colonial South Africa. Charles John Lockhart Rudd, known as Jack, was educated at Harrow School and at Trinity College, Cambridge. He had some success in cricket at Harrow as a left-handed tail-end batsman and a left-handed fast bowler, taking seven wickets in the Eton v Harrow match of 1892. But at Cambridge University he was given only a single match, again batted at the tail-end, and failed to take a wicket in his six expensive overs. He did not play again.

Rudd graduated from Cambridge with a Bachelor of Arts degree in 1895; the directory of Cambridge alumni does not record any profession for him.
