= Daniel Ainsleigh =

English actor and acting coach

- Born: 8 February 1976 (age 49); Hexham, Northumberland, England
- Occupation: Actor

Daniel Ainsleigh (born 8 February 1976) is an English actor and acting coach. Born in Hexham, Ainsleigh attended the Webber Douglas Academy of Dramatic Art and has worked extensively in theatre, film and television.

== Filmography ==
=== Film ===
Year	Title	Role	Notes
2000	Quills	Guerin	
2001	Girl from Rio	Police Officer	
2002	Club Le Monde	Steve	

=== Television ===
Year	Title	Role	Notes
1999–2003	Casualty	Jason Rees / Tony	3 episodes
1999–2007	The Bill	Various roles	5 episodes
2000	Peak Practice	Frankie Flynne	Episode: "Hopes and Dreams"
2000	A Christmas Carol	Dave	Television film
2000	The Secret	John Musgrave	2 episodes
2001	Spaced	Billy	Episode: "Mettle"
2001	Buried Treasure	Lee	Television film
2001	Micawber	Irving	Episode: "Micawber Learns the Truth"
2002	Cutting It	Damien	Episode #1.5
2003	Danielle Cable: Eyewitness	Lawyer	Television film
2003, 2006	Holby City	Evan Garling / Jason Rees	2 episodes
2004	Steel River Blues	Jeremy Lloyd	7 episodes
2005	EastEnders	Craig	Episode dated 19 December 2005
2006	Doctors	David Coverly	Episode: "The Real Thing"
2006	Silent Witness	Garth Templar	2 episodes
2006	The Haunted Airman	Pilot Officer	Television film
2006	Heartbeat	Peter Seton	Episode: "Please Please Me"
2012	World Without End	William	3 episodes
