= A Christmas Carol (2000 film) =

TV film directed by Catherine Morshead

- Genre: Crime; Fantasy
- Based on: A Christmas Carol by Charles Dickens
- Written by: Peter Bowker
- Directed by: Catherine Morshead
- Starring: Ross Kemp; Warren Mitchell; Liz Smith; Michael Maloney; Angeline Ball; Ray Fearon; Mina Anwar; Lorraine Ashbourne
- Composer: Simon Lacey
- Country of origin: United Kingdom
- Original language: English

Production
- Executive producers: Laura Mackie; Jo Wright
- Producer: Joshua St. Johnston
- Cinematography: David Higgs
- Editor: Nick McPhee
- Running time: 90 minutes
- Production company: London Weekend Television

Original release
- Network: ITV
- Release: 20 December 2000

A Christmas Carol is a 2000 British crime fantasy television film, written by Peter Bowker, that first broadcast on ITV on 20 December 2000. The film is a modern adaptation of Charles Dickens' 1843 novella of the same name, and stars Ross Kemp in the role of Eddie Scrooge, a cruel and unscrupulous loan shark who brings misery to the residents of a poor housing estate until he is haunted by ghosts who place him in a time loop.

The film was one of a number of projects offered to Kemp as part of his "golden handcuffs" deal with ITV, following his departure from EastEnders. 9.41 million viewers watched the film on its debut Wednesday night broadcast. The film is also regularly repeated on ITV3 during the buildup to Christmas each year. The film has never been released on DVD.

== Synopsis ==
Jacob Marley, a criminal and associate of predatory loan shark Eddie Scrooge, is murdered. On Christmas Eve, Scrooge terrorises his debtors on a local housing estate collecting payments, aided by Bob Cratchit, who works for Scrooge to pay off his own debts. Marley's mother, a charity collector, suspects that Scrooge was involved with her son's death. Scrooge declines a Christmas invitation from his nephew and returns to his home. That evening, Scrooge is visited by the ghost of Marley, who is bound in chains forged by his sins. Marley tells Scrooge to expect three more ghosts. The Ghost of Christmas Past, Scrooge's late father, shows him visions of his past; his troubled upbringing, his entry into crime and meeting his ex-girlfriend Bella, who split from Scrooge because of his criminal lifestyle.

Scrooge rudely dismisses his father and finds it is Christmas Eve again, and is able to predict the events of the day, about which he changes nothing. Marley reappears, this time as the Ghost of Christmas Present, and shows Scrooge the present Christmas, including the festivities of his debtors, who are nonetheless happy. Bob's son Tim spends the day in hospital, bedridden from cystic fibrosis. Two teenagers living rough on the estate die from hypothermia, and they both appear before Scrooge and Marley as ghosts.

Christmas Eve resets again, and Scrooge half-heartedly attempts to change events to impress Bella. Scrooge tries to save the teenagers, but fails to save the sister because the ambulance required a police escort due to local crime. When confronted once again by Marley's ghost, Scrooge confesses to Marley that he is partially responsible for his murder: Marley was operating in the territory of a crook named Stiles. Scrooge arranged a meeting between the two, not knowing Stiles' murderous intentions. Scrooge concedes that he does not enjoy his life and Marley vanishes.

Attempting to escape the haunting, Scrooge meets the Ghost of Christmas Future, a mute boy. The boy takes Scrooge to the near future (revealed to be 2005 by the plate on Scrooge's grave), where Tim dies and the Cratchits split apart in grief. The future Scrooge is impliedly murdered, much to the jubilation of his debtors, and his belongings are flogged. The present Scrooge vows to change his ways if he is allowed to return to the present, which he is.

Waking up on Christmas Eve for the last time, Scrooge saves the teenagers, cancels his debts and anonymously donates to the poor, including the Cratchits. He reveals the identity of Marley's killer and spends Christmas with Dave and his family. Scrooge tells Bella about his hauntings and, despite her disbelief, she takes him back. Years later, Scrooge and Bella are ice-skating with their son Marley, who had previously appeared to Scrooge as the third ghost.

== Cast ==
- Ross Kemp as Edward "Eddie" Scrooge
- Warren Mitchell as James Scrooge, Eddie's Father (the Ghost of Christmas Past)
- Liz Smith as Joyce
- Michael Maloney as Bob Cratchit
- Angeline Ball as Bella
- Ray Fearon as Jacob Marley (the Ghost of Christmas Present)
- Mina Anwar as Julie
- Lorraine Ashbourne as Sue Cratchit
- Daniel Ainsleigh as Dave
- Claudie Blakley as Ellie
- Chloe Howman as Jane
- Bill Thomas as Ted
- Ben Tibber as Tiny Tim Cratchit
- Ben Inigo-Jones as Eddie's Son (the Ghost of Christmas Yet to Come)

== See also ==
- Adaptations of A Christmas Carol
- List of Christmas films
- Groundhog Day, a film with a similar theme of a time loop.
