= Sarah Preston =

English actress

- Born: Middlesbrough, England
- Education: Royal Academy of Dramatic Art
- Occupations: Actor, writer, producer
- Years active: 1994–present

Sarah Preston is an English actress, writer and producer. She is known for her television roles as Karen Newburn in the BBC medical drama Holby City, Amanda Parry in EastEnders, and the recurring Make-up Woman in the BBC comedy Extras. She has also appeared in In Deep, Steel River Blues, Vera, The Last Detective, Where the Heart Is and Doctors. Preston trained at the Royal Academy of Dramatic Art (RADA), graduating with a diploma in acting in 1994, and is the founder of the North East-based television and film production company Bamboo Media Productions.

== Early life and training ==
Preston grew up in the North East of England and began acting on stage at the age of five. Her early experience included productions with Stockton Youth Theatre, where she appeared in Cabaret, Jesus Christ Superstar and Sweet Charity alongside Mark Benton and Marcus Bentley.

She later moved to London to train for three years at the Royal Academy of Dramatic Art (RADA), graduating with a diploma in acting. While at RADA, Preston trained in stage fighting and received the John Barton Prize.

== Acting career ==
One of Preston's early film roles was as Meg in The House of Angelo, in which she also worked as a fight double.

Her first major television role was as Karen Newburn, a ward sister in the BBC medical drama Holby City. Preston appeared as a series regular during the programme's first two series, with storylines including Karen's relationship with her former husband Nick Jordan, played by Michael French.

Her other television roles include appearances in EastEnders, In Deep, Steel River Blues and Extras, as well as guest roles in Vera, The Last Detective, Where the Heart Is and Doctors.

== Writing and production ==
Preston founded Bamboo Media Productions, a North East-based television and film production company focused on developing high-end television and film projects. The company has participated in Creative UK's North East Create Growth Programme.

=== Filmography ===
Year	Title	Role	Notes
1995	The Glass Virgin	Agnes Fairbairn	Series 1, episodes 2 & 3
1995	Pie in the Sky	Receptionist	Episode: "Lemon Twist"
1995	Men of the World	Laura	Episode: "Stolen Kiss"
1997	The House of Angelo	Meg	Film
1999	Tilly Trotter	Mary Bentwood	Series 1, episodes 1 & 2
1999–2000	Holby City	Karen Newburn	24 episodes
2000	Badger	Amanda	Episode: "The Last Flight"
2000	Doctors	Celia Cobb	Episode: "Looking After"
2001	Where the Heart Is	Julia Joyce	Episode: "The Ties That Bind"
2001	Murder in Mind	Sandra	Episode: "Vigilante"
2002	Out Done	Sarah	Short film
2003	In Deep	Katy Gannon	Episodes: "Men & Boys" Parts 1 & 2
2004	Steel River Blues	Belinda Moss	2 episodes
2004	Doctors	Karen Rees	Episode: "Passing By"
2005	Eva	Rachel	Short film
2005	EastEnders	Amanda Parry	8 episodes
2006	Extras	Make-up Woman	3 episodes, series 2
2007	The Last Detective	Kitty Sullivan	Episode: "The Dead Peasants Society"
2011	Vera	Jeannie Long	Episode: "Telling Tales"
2011	Doctors	Beth Wilde	Episode: "Defying Gravity"
2013	Doctors	Yvonne Turnham	Episode: "Falling"
2019	Out of Water	Carol	Short film
2024	Miss or Misses	Paul's Mother	Film
2025	Mirror, Signal, Manoeuvre	Janet	Short film; winner, Best Comedy, Ealing Film Festival 2025

=== Selected stage credits ===
Year	Production	Role	Venue / Company
1991	Teachers	Gail	The Theatre Upstairs, Billingham
1993	Camille	Sophie de Lyonne	Vanbrugh Theatre, London
1994	Phaedra	Aricia	Studio Theatre, London
1994	It's a Girl	Mary	Gielgud Theatre, London
1994	Trojan Women	Helen of Troy	Studio Theatre, London
1994	Our Country's Good	Mary Brenham / Meg Long	Vanbrugh Theatre
2016	Silas Marner	Nancy Lammeter	The Royalty Theatre, Billingham
2018	Gone Silent	The Mother	Finborough Theatre
2019	A Place of Safety	Kate Todd	Hint of Lime Productions, Omnibus Theatre
