= The House of Angelo =

- Directed by: Jim Goddard
- Written by: Peter Woodward
- Produced by: Don Reynolds; Edward Woodward; Peter Woodward
- Starring: Isla Blair; Julian Glover; Paul Freeman; Richard Griffiths
- Cinematography: John Handler
- Edited by: John Gow
- Music by: Ray Russell
- Production companies: British Broadcasting Corporation; Tripal Productions
- Release date: 1997
- Running time: 90 minutes
- Country: United Kingdom
- Language: English

The House of Angelo is a 1997 British historical drama film directed by Jim Goddard and starring Edward Woodward, Peter Woodward and Sylvia Syms.

== Plot ==
In eighteenth century London, the celebrated Angelo family of fencing instructors are employed to protect a visiting Ambassador from French assassins.

== Cast ==
- Edward Woodward as Dominic Angelo
- Peter Woodward as Harry Angelo
- Sylvia Syms as Alice Angelo
- Isla Blair as Peg Wallington
- Anthony Valentine as Lord Travers
- Rudolph Walker as Somers
- Julian Glover as Sir Robert Willoughby
- Patrick Toomey as Mr. Clare
- Sarah Preston as Meg
- David Robb as Lord Vanbrugh
- Joe Shaw as Octavius
- Sarah Woodward as Elisabeth Angelo
- Tim Woodward as William Angelo
- Blair Plant as Foster
- Mark Delafield as Sir James
- Anne-Marie Marriott as Maria
- Qarie Marshall as Swordsman
- Mark Byron as Swordsman
