= Made in Romania =

- Directed by: Guy J. Louthan
- Written by: Guy J. Louthan and Neil Monaghan
- Produced by: Guy J. Louthan
- Starring: Jennifer Tilly, Jason Flemyng, Elizabeth Hurley, and Joe Shaw
- Cinematography: Gabriel Kosuth
- Edited by: Mirela Murisan
- Music by: Trevor Gilchrist
- Release date: 28 December 2010
- Running time: 95 minutes
- Country: United Kingdom
- Language: English

Made in Romania is the first film directed by producer Guy J. Louthan. It is a comedy film featuring Jennifer Tilly, Jason Flemyng, and Elizabeth Hurley as themselves in a mockumentary about an American/British film crew in Romania making a movie based on a Victorian novel.
