= John Blades Currey =

South African politician

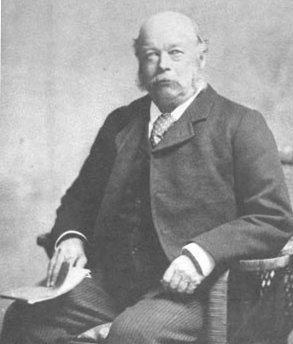
- John Blades Currey

Colonial Secretary of Griqualand West
- In office ?

Personal details
- Born: 1829
- Died: 1904 (aged 74–75)
- Children: Henry Latham Currey

John Blades "JB" Currey (1829–1904) was Colonial Secretary to the Government of Griqualand West and an influential businessman and politician of the Cape Colony.

Currey arrived in Southern African in 1850. He tried a range of professions before joining the Cape Civil Service.

He later became Colonial Secretary to the colony of Griqualand West, and named the town of Kimberley (previously "New Rush"). He was largely blamed for the diggers rebellion in Griqualand West in 1875 ("Black Flag Rebellion"), and was consequently dismissed.

Currey's eldest son, Henry Latham Currey became Secretary to Cecil Rhodes and later a politician who sat in the House of Assembly of South Africa.
