= Charles Rudd =

British businessman (1844–1916)

Charles D. Rudd
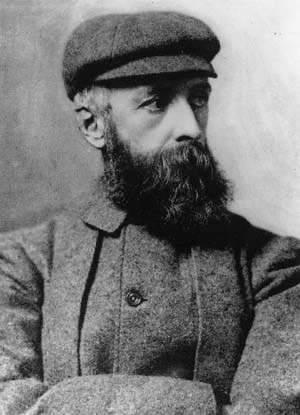
- Portrait photo of Rudd by an unknown photographer From the National Archives of Zimbabwe
- Born: 22 October 1844; Hanworth Hall, Norfolk
- Died: 16 November 1916 (aged 72); London
- Resting place: Acharacle, Argyll
- Known for: Rudd Concession; business associate of Cecil Rhodes

Charles Dunell Rudd (22 October 1844 – 15 November 1916) was the main business associate of Cecil Rhodes.

== Early life ==
He was born at Hamworth Hall, Norfolk, the son of Henry Rudd (1809–1884) and his first wife Mary Stanbridge. His family had been in the shipbuilding and paint businesses.

Rudd studied at Harrow School (1857–1862) and then entered Trinity College, Cambridge in 1863, where he excelled in playing rackets. He left for Cape Colony in 1865 before completing his degree, according to himself under medical advice. There he hunted with the likes of John Dunn and endeavored in various business enterprises. In the early 1870s, he worked for his brother Thomas' (1831–1902) Port Elizabeth-based trading firm.

== Partnership with Cecil Rhodes ==
In 1872/3 Rudd and Rhodes became friends and partners, working diamond claims in Kimberley, dealing in diamonds and operating pumping and ice-making machinery, amongst many other odds and ends. Between 1873 and 1881, while Rhodes intermittently attended college in England, Rudd managed their interests. By 1880 they had become rich and, with others, formed the De Beers Mining Company. Rudd was one of the directors and also held large interests in the main machinery supplier for the mining fields.

== The Rudd Concession ==
In 1887 Rudd's interests had shifted to gold, the previous year discovered at the Witwatersrand. With Rhodes and him as directors, and his brother Thomas as chairman, they registered Gold Fields of South Africa Ltd in early 1887. The company was structured to enormously favor Rudd and Rhodes, with its London board unaware of most of their activities in southern Africa. On 30 October 1888 Rudd secured an agreement to the mineral rights of Matabeleland and Mashonaland from Lobengula, the King of Matabeleland. The agreement became known as the Rudd Concession. Matabeleland and Mashonaland form the bulk of what is now known as Zimbabwe.

Rhodes and Rudd had duped the British government and the investing public into believing that the concession was vested in the public company and made millions of pounds when the British South Africa Company bought the concession. Rudd had disagreements with Rhodes, in 1895 proclaiming that he would no longer work with Rhodes, and perhaps was unaware of the Gold Fields' conspiracy which culminated in the disastrous Jameson raid. Still, Rudd remained a friend of Rhodes and a director of Gold Fields until 1902, after which he retired to Scotland, "enjoying the life of an Edwardian plutocrat". In 1896, he bought the Ardnamurchan estate in Argyll, where he built two "houses", one of which, Glenborrodale Castle, was just for his guests. He died in 1916 after an unsuccessful prostate operation in a nursing home in London.

Rudd took an interest in natural history, collected specimens and sponsored a collection exploration (the "Rudd exploration") of the south African region by Captain Claude H. B. Grant who named two birds after his sponsor, Rudd’s Lark and Rudd’s Apalis.

== Family ==
In the late 1860s in South Africa, Rudd married his first wife, Frances Georgina "Fanny" Leighton Chiappini (born 1846). Her great aunt was Maria Stella, Lady Newborough who claimed that she was not a member of the Chiappini family but had been exchanged at birth for a boy who became King Louis Philippe. Rudd and Fanny had a daughter, Evelyn, and three sons: Henry Percy, known as Percy; Franklyn Martin; and Charles John Lockhart, known as Jack. Percy's son, Bevil Rudd was an Olympic champion 400-meter runner. Frances died in 1896 of influenza or tuberculosis, and in 1898 Rudd married 24-year-old Corrie Maria Wallace, the daughter of his partner in the machinery company in Kimberley, with whom he had three more children.
