= Henry Latham Currey =

British-South African politician

House of Assembly of South Africa
- In office 1910-1915

Cape House of Assembly for George, Western Cape
- In office 1902-1910

Personal details
- Born: 1863
- Died: 1945 (aged 81–82)
- Spouse: Ethelreda Fairbridge (d. 1941)
- Children: 5
- Parent: John Blades Currey (father)
- Relatives: Charles Fairbridge (father-in-law)

Henry Latham Currey (1863 – 1945), also known as Harry Currey was a British politician in the Cape Colony.

== Biography ==
Currey was the son of John Blades Currey and Mary Margaret Christian, daughter of Ewan Christian. He was educated at The King's School, Canterbury and went then to Winchester College.

Currey joined the Cape Civil Service in 1880, where he worked for six years. He became private secretary to John X. Merriman in 1883 and then after one year to Cecil Rhodes, both personal friends of his father. In 1887, Rhodes made him additionally secretary of the Consolidated Gold Fields of South Africa Ltd., a post he held until 1894, when they split over Currey's engagement. Despite however the rift between them, Rhodes's friendship to the father did not change.

In 1897, Currey was called to the bar by the Inner Temple. He was elected to the Cape House of Assembly for George, Western Cape in 1902, sitting until 1910; the last two years as Minister without Portfolio in Merriman's government. Following the formation of the Union of South Africa, he was returned to the House of Assembly of South Africa until 1915.

He married Ethelreda Fairbridge, daughter of Charles Aken Fairbridge at St Paul's Church in Rondebosch and had by her three sons and two daughters. Currey's wife died in 1941 and he survived her for four years, dying in Kenilworth, Cape Town.
