= Public holidays in Rhodesia =

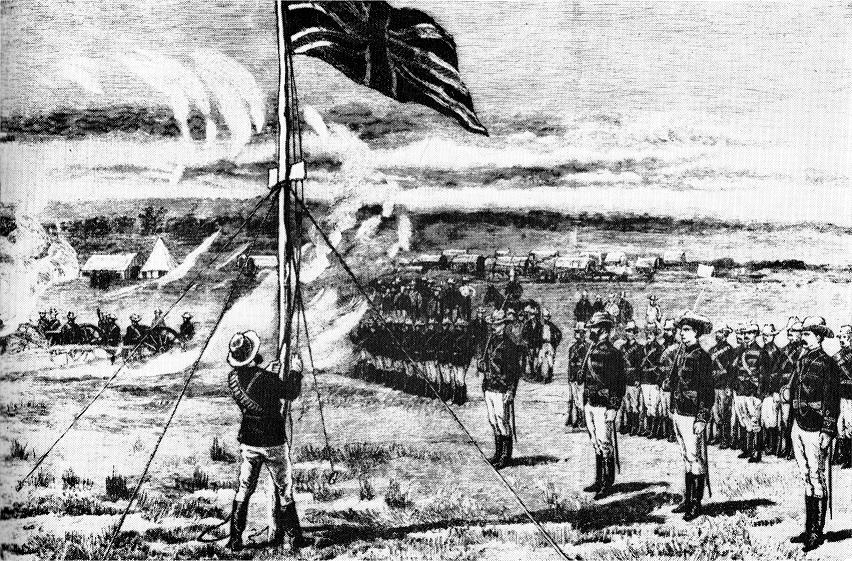
Lieutenant Edward Tyndale-Biscoe hoists the Union Jack on the kopje overlooking Fort Salisbury on the morning of 13 September 1890. The day of the column's arrival, 12 September, was a national holiday between 1920 and 1979.

Public holidays in Rhodesia, a historical region in southern Africa equivalent to today's Zimbabwe and Zambia—formerly Southern and Northern Rhodesia, respectively—were largely based around milestones in the region's short history. (Note: Rhodesia was demarcated and named under Company rule, which lasted from the 1890s to the 1920s. Northern Rhodesia was a British protectorate from 1924 to 1964, when it became independent as Zambia. Southern Rhodesia was, in British eyes, a self-governing colony from 1923 to 1980; between 1965 and 1979 it was an unrecognised state called Rhodesia (the Republic of Rhodesia from 1970), and latterly Zimbabwe Rhodesia. It became Zimbabwe in 1980.) Annual holidays marked various aspects of the arrival of white people during the 1880s and 1890s, as well as the respective unilateral declarations of independence (1965) and of republican government (1970). On these days, most businesses and non-essential services closed. A number of Christian holidays were also observed according to custom, in the traditional British manner, and referred to in official documents by name—Christmas Day, for example, or Easter Monday.

Rhodesian non-work days were first defined in 1895, by The Bills of Exchange Regulations passed by Leander Starr Jameson, the second administrator of the territory appointed by the British South Africa Company. Holidays were instituted along traditional British lines, with some others created exclusively for Rhodesia: Shangani Day, on 4 December, marked the anniversary of the Shangani Patrol being killed in battle, while Rhodes's Day and Founders' Day—respectively commemorating Company chief Cecil Rhodes and his contemporaries—were held consecutively, starting on the first or second Monday of each July, to create the annual four-day "Rhodes and Founders' weekend". Shangani Day was replaced as a public holiday by Occupation Day in 1920, but continued to be unofficially marked thereafter. Occupation Day, held on 12 September each year, marked the anniversary of the arrival of the Pioneer Column at Fort Salisbury in 1890, and their raising of the Union Jack on the kopje overlooking the site. It was renamed Pioneers' Day in 1961.

Southern Rhodesia effectively became the entirety of Rhodesia in 1964 when Northern Rhodesia became independent as Zambia. After Southern Rhodesia's colonial government unilaterally declared independence from Britain on 11 November 1965, the anniversary became celebrated as Independence Day. The penultimate Monday in October was designated Republic Day in 1970 following the adoption of a republican system of government. All of these holidays were celebrated until 1979, when Rhodesia reconstituted itself under majority rule as the unrecognised state of Zimbabwe Rhodesia. The country's national holidays were replaced soon after with alternatives intended to be more inclusive: President's Day, Unity Day and Ancestors' Day. These were in turn superseded in April 1980, when the country became the recognised state of Zimbabwe. The modern Zimbabwean holiday calendar differs radically from that of Rhodesia, but retains every one of the traditional holidays defined by name in the 1895 Bills of Exchange Regulations, with the exception of Whit Monday.

== Rhodesian holidays ==
Key

- The Rhodesian flag (1968–79) appears beside the names of those national holidays exclusive to Rhodesia.
- "Years observed" refers to years when the holiday was official as a non-work day; traditional holidays such as Christmas were observed by Rhodesians before 1895, but no legal framework for public holidays had yet been enacted.

Name	Date	Years observed	Notes
New Year's Day	1 January	1895–1979	Statutory public holiday, defined by name in The Bills of Exchange Regulations, 1895
Good Friday	Moveable feast	1895–1979	Statutory public holiday, defined by name in The Bills of Exchange Regulations, 1895
Holy Saturday	Moveable feast	1895–1979	Statutory public holiday, defined by name in The Bills of Exchange Regulations, 1895
Easter Monday	Moveable feast	1895–1979	Statutory public holiday, defined by name in The Bills of Exchange Regulations, 1895
Whit Monday	Moveable feast	1895–1979	Statutory public holiday, defined by name in The Bills of Exchange Regulations, 1895
(Rhodesia) Rhodes Day	First or second Monday in July	1895–1979	One of the original Rhodesian holidays designated by The Bills of Exchange Regulations, 1895. Commemorated Cecil Rhodes' birthday (5 July 1853).
(Rhodesia) Founders' Day	The day after Rhodes Day	1895–1979	One of the original Rhodesian holidays designated by The Bills of Exchange Regulations, 1895. Commemorated founders of white rule in the region other than Rhodes; deliberately placed directly following Rhodes Day to create what became commonly known as the annual four-day "Rhodes and Founders' weekend".
(Rhodesia) Pioneers' Day	12 September	1920–1979	Created as Occupation Day by the Bank Holiday Amendment Ordnance, 1920, in place of Shangani Day. Renamed Pioneers' Day by the Bills of Exchange Amendment, 1961. Commemorated the anniversary of the arrival of the Pioneer Column at the site of Fort Salisbury in 1890, and their raising of the Union Jack on Salisbury Kopje, thereby marking the foundation of the city.
(Rhodesia) Republic Day	Second-to-last Monday in October	1970–1979	Commemorated the declaration of a republic on 2 March 1970. The government initially considered holding Republic Day on 11 November in place of Independence Day, but eventually settled on the second-to-last Monday in October. The date deliberately coincided with that month's mid-term school weekend (during which boarders returned home) as it had previously been the only one not extended by a public holiday.
(Rhodesia) Independence Day	11 November	1966–1979	Commemorated the anniversary of the Unilateral Declaration of Independence in 1965. Coincided with Armistice Day, the anniversary of the 1918 Armistice with Germany at the end of the First World War, which had been marked since 1919, but not as a public holiday.
(Rhodesia) Shangani Day	4 December	1895–1920	One of the original Rhodesian holidays designated by The Bills of Exchange Regulations, 1895. Replaced as a public holiday with Occupation Day (later Pioneers' Day) in the Bank Holiday Amendment Ordnance, 1920, but still unofficially marked thereafter. Commemorated the anniversary of the Shangani Patrol's annihilation in 1893.
Day of the Vow	16 December	1938–1940	A South African holiday celebrating the Voortrekkers' victory in the Battle of Blood River. The Southern Rhodesian government recognised it for some years due to requests by the Afrikaans Cultural Union of Rhodesia, an Afrikaner cultural organisation.
Christmas Day	25 December	1895–1979	Statutory public holiday, defined by name in The Bills of Exchange Regulations, 1895.
Boxing Day	26 or 27 December	1895–1979	Statutory public holiday, defined by name in The Bills of Exchange Regulations, 1895. Generally the day after Christmas, but celebrated on 27 December where 26 December was a Sunday.

== Notes and references ==
Footnote

Online sources

- "Zimbabwe's holidays". zim.gov.zw. Harare: Ministry of Media, Information and Publicity, Government of Zimbabwe.

Newspaper articles

- "Rhodesia's First Day as a Republic Passes Quietly". The New York Times. 3 March 1970.
- "Rhodesia's Quiet Republic Day". The Glasgow Herald. 20 October 1970.

Bibliography

- Fisher, J L (2010). Pioneers, settlers, aliens, exiles: the decolonisation of white identity in Zimbabwe. Canberra: ANU E Press. ISBN 978-1-921666-14-8.
- McWhirter, Norris; McWhirter, Ross (1969). Dunlop Illustrated Encyclopedia of Facts. New York: Doubleday. p. 766.
- Wilson, N H; Taylor, Guy A, eds. (1935). "The Southern Rhodesia Native Affairs Department annual. Issues 13–18". Salisbury: Southern Rhodesia Native Affairs Department: 164–168.
- Wood, J R T (June 2005). So far and no further! Rhodesia's bid for independence during the retreat from empire 1959–1965. Victoria, British Columbia: Trafford Publishing. ISBN 978-1-4120-4952-8.
- "Bills of Exchange Amendment". The Statute Law of Southern Rhodesia: Acts of Parliament from 1st January to 31st December 1961. Salisbury: Argus Printing and Publishing Company: 11–13. 1962.
- "Enactment of New Constitution Bill and Related Legislation". Keesing's Record of World Events. XVII. Cambridge: Keesing's: 23,810. February 1970.
- "Public Holidays". Rhodesia Calls. Salisbury: Rhodesia National Tourist Board: 48, 91. November–December 1972.
- "Southern Rhodesia: Bank Holidays or Non-Business Days". Board of Trade Journal. XLII. London: Her Majesty's Stationery Office: 609. 1903.

== See also ==
- Public holidays in Zimbabwe
