= Flag of the British South Africa Company =

Flag used by the British South Africa Company and Rhodesia under company rule

The flag of the British South Africa Company

The flag of the British South Africa Company was the flag used by the British South Africa Company (BSAC) and Rhodesia under company rule. It was adopted in 1892 and was used until 1923 when the south of Rhodesia voted to become Southern Rhodesia and the north was surrendered to the Colonial Office to become Northern Rhodesia. The flag remained as the company's commercial flag until 1965. The flag consisted of a British Union Flag with the company's logo of a lion and tusk on a white circle in the centre with "B.S.A.C." underneath it.

== History ==
The British South Africa Company headed by Cecil Rhodes received a royal charter from Queen Victoria to create a new British colony in Africa. The Pioneer Column of the BSAC set out and founded Salisbury in 1890. The BSAC flag they had ordered to be made did not reach South Africa from England in time before the column set off. As a result, the Union Flag was raised instead, although it had been suggested that they use a white flag with the letters "BSACo" on it. The BSAC flag eventually arrived in the newly established Rhodesia in 1892 and was first raised over Fort Salisbury. In 1893, it was raised over Bulawayo, following the company's conquest of the Matabeleland.

In 1922, Rhodesian voters voted in the Southern Rhodesian government referendum for responsible government independent of the BSAC ahead of joining the Union of South Africa. Remaining under BSAC control was considered but was eventually not included in the final ballot. As such, the BSAC flag was lowered on 29 September 1923 by the British South Africa Police when the colony's new status as Southern Rhodesia came into being with the Union Flag becoming the only official flag. However, it is speculated that it was retained by the Governor of Southern Rhodesia as the governor's flag until around 1931. The same happened in what would become Northern Rhodesia where the BSAC surrendered its role in the colony to the Colonial Office via an order in council from His Majesty's Privy Council. Despite the flag losing its status as a colonial flag, the BSAC flag continued to be used by the British South Africa Company as their private company flag and they would fly it over their offices in London and in the Rhodesias. This situation continued until 1965 when the British South Africa Company merged with the Anglo-American Corporation.

== Anomalies ==
Red Ensign (left), Blue Ensign (centre), Zambian red ring version (right)

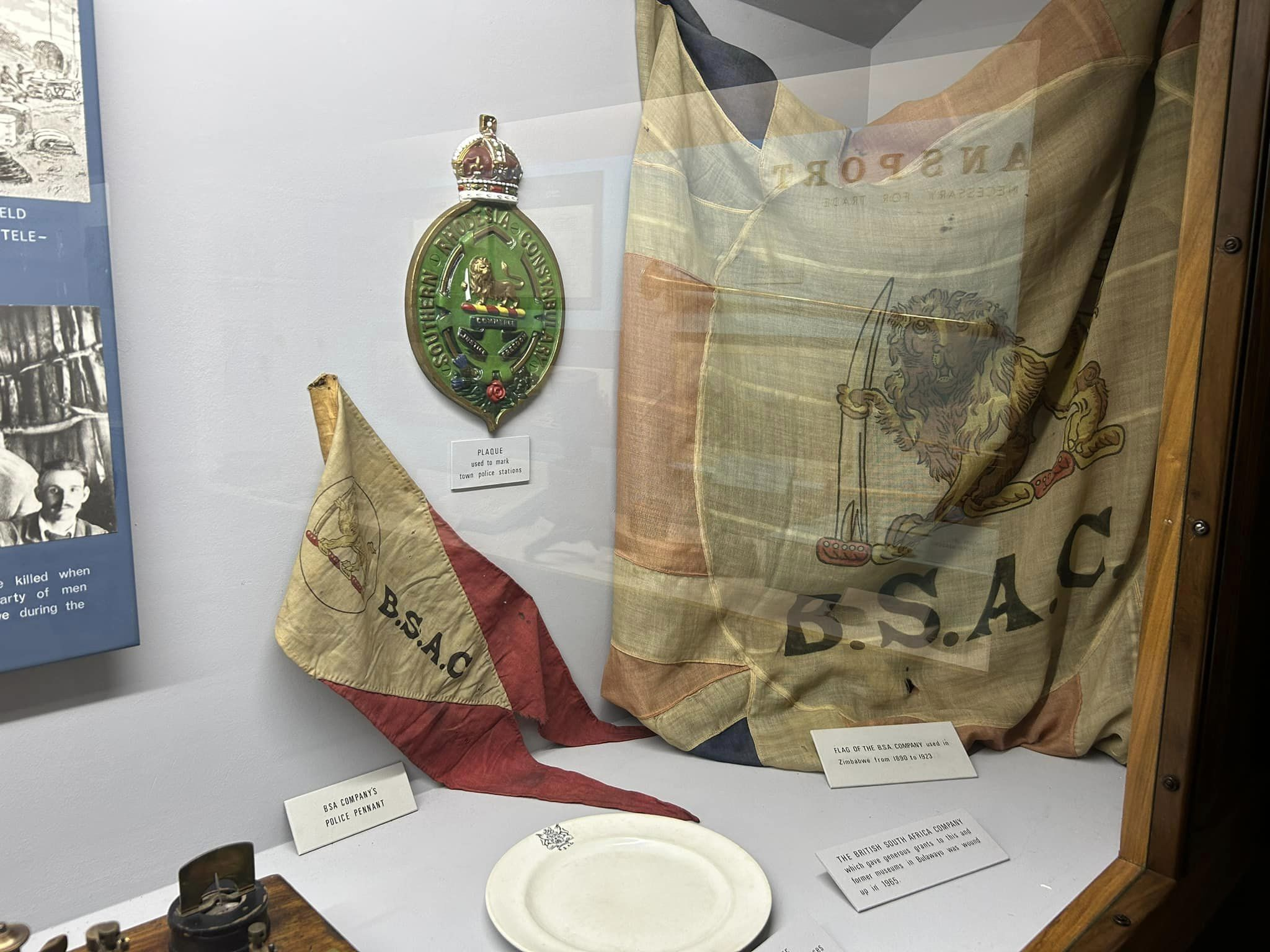
The BSAC flag in the Natural History Museum in Bulawayo

As the British South Africa Company flag had no formal description or definition in the Royal charter, the design of the flag is not standardised. The most common discussion was if there was a red ring around the white disk. Versions of the flag held by the National Archives of Zimbabwe (including the final flag that flew over the Magistrates Court in Bulawayo) do not have the ring on it. But versions held by the British National Army Museum and Livingstone Museum in Zambia do. It was reported that the version with a red ring was used since 1889, and the version without a red ring began to be used in 1893. There were also discussions as to if the flag had red or Blue Ensigns based upon it. Though ensigns based on the flag do appear on flag charts, it is speculated they were never used as Rhodesia did not border the sea.
