= James Darling =

James Darling may refer to:

- James Darling (publisher) (1797–1862), Scottish bookseller, publisher and bibliographer
- James Darling (priest) (1868–1938), Archdeacon of Suffolk
- James Andrew Darling (1891–1979), Scottish-born farmer and political figure in Saskatchewan, Canada
- James Ralph Darling (1899–1995), English-born educator in Australia
- James Darling (American football) (born 1974), American football linebacker
- James ffolliott Darling, Irish trooper and naturalist.
- James Darling (artist) (fl. 2000s), Australian artist, on the board of Ace Open in Adelaide, South Australia
