= British South Africa Company Medal =

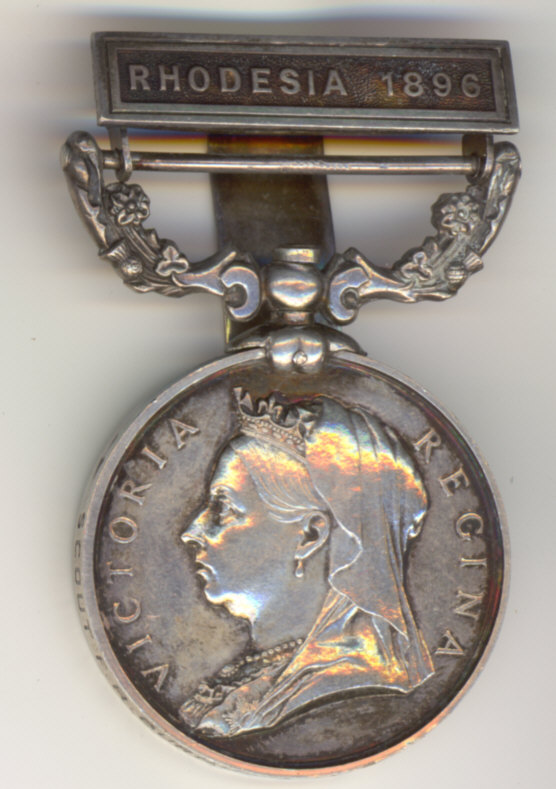
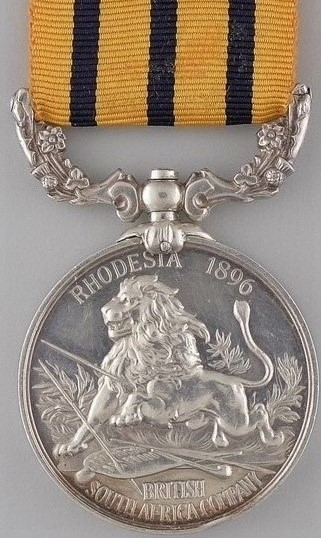
- Medal: Obverse, and reverse for Rhodesia 1896.
- Type: Medal
- Awarded for: Service in the Matabele Wars
- Description: Circular silver medal, 36 mm in diameter.
- Presented by: the British South Africa Company
- Campaigns: First Matabele War; Second Matabele War; Pioneer Column
- Clasps: Matabeleland 1893, Rhodesia 1896, Mashonaland 1897, Mashonaland 1890
- Established: 1896, 1897, 1927
- Ribbon bar

The British South Africa Company Medal (1890–97). In 1896, Queen Victoria sanctioned the issue by the British South Africa Company of a medal to troops who had been engaged in the First Matabele War. In 1897, the award was extended to those engaged in the two campaigns of the Second Matabele War, namely Rhodesia (1896) and Mashonaland (1897). The three medals are the same except for name of the campaign for which the medal was issued, inscribed on the reverse.

In 1927, the government of Southern Rhodesia re-issued the medal and instituted a new clasp, to commemorate the Pioneer Column that operated within Mashonaland in 1890. Those previously awarded the medal were required to exchange it for the new version.

The majority of awards were to colonial and locally raised troops, rather than members of the regular British Army.

== Description ==
The medal is circular, made of silver and 36 millimetres (1.4 in) in diameter. It was manufactured by Heaton and Company of Birmingham.

The obverse depicts a left facing effigy of Queen Victoria wearing a diadem and veil. Around the edge is the inscription Victoria Regina.

The reverse, designed by Richard Caton Woodville Jr, depicts a charging lion, wounded in the chest with an assegai. In the foreground are native weapons and a shield, in the background is a mimosa bush, and below the scene the inscription: BRITISH SOUTH AFRICA COMPANY. The recipient's first eligible campaign is inscribed at the top on all versions of the medal except the 1927 issue.

The medal is mounted on an ornate swivelling suspension bar decorated with shamrocks, thistles and roses. The medal hangs from a 35 millimetres (1.4 in) wide ribbon of watered silk in golden yellow with three dark blue stripes.

They were named to the recipient using a number of different engraved and impressed styles, depending on when the medal was issued.

== Clasps ==
The recipient's first eligible campaign is inscribed on the reverse, either MATABELELAND 1893, RHODESIA 1896 or MASHONALAND 1897, with any subsequent campaign indicated by an appropriate clasp. The one exception is the medal for Mashonaland 1890, issued in 1927, where the reverse bears no details of the campaign, with all eligible campaigns represented by a clasp.

The four clasps issued were:

1. Matabeleland 1893 (Only awarded with the 1927 medal. Originally recipients received the medal without clasp, with the campaign inscribed on the reverse)
2. Rhodesia 1896
3. Mashonaland 1897
4. Mashonaland 1890 (Awarded in 1927)

Four men were entitled to the medal with all four bars, although only one was issued. Twelve medals were awarded with three bars.

== Notable recipients ==
- Robert Baden-Powell - service in: Rhodesia (1896)
- Frederick Russell Burnham - service in: Matabeleland (1893); Rhodesia (1896)
- James ffolliott Darling
- Col. Frank Rhodes
- Frederick Selous - service in: Mashonaland (1890); Matabeleland (1893); Rhodesia (1896)
