= Pioneers' Day =

Former public holiday in Rhodesia

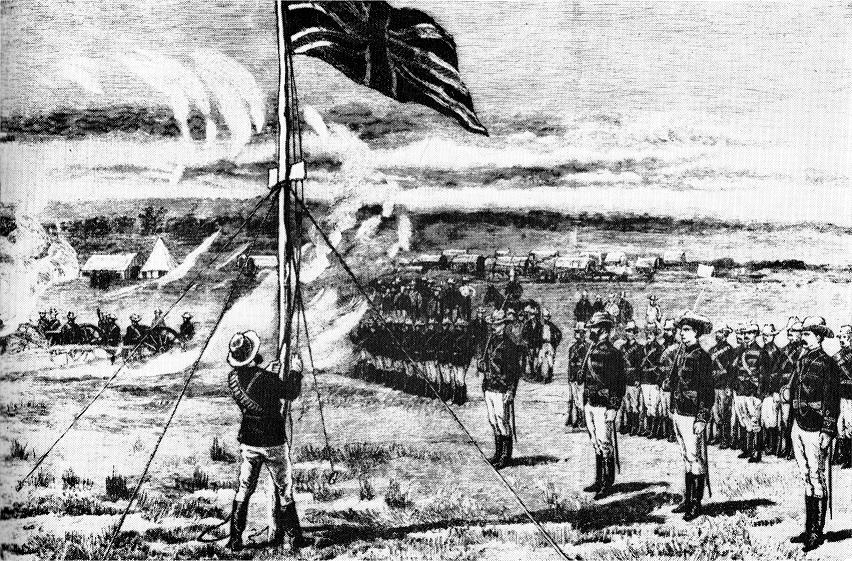
- The flag being raised at Fort Salisbury in 1890
- Observed by: Rhodesia
- Significance: Commemorates the Pioneer Column that founded Rhodesia
- Observances: Flag raising in Salisbury, prayer service, military parades
- Date: 12 September
- Next time: 12 September 2025
- Frequency: Annual
- First time: 1920
- Last time: 1979

Pioneers' Day or Pioneer Day was a public holiday in Rhodesia. The day was created to commemorate the Pioneer Column led by Cecil Rhodes and the British South Africa Company on 12 September 1890. It was originally called Occupation Day when established in 1920 but was renamed as Pioneers' Day in 1961. The day was abolished as a public holiday following Rhodesia becoming Zimbabwe in 1980.

== Background ==
The Pioneer Column was part of a plan by Rhodes and the BSAC to settle the Mashonaland. On 12 September 1890, the settlers raised the Union Jack over Fort Salisbury (later shortened to Salisbury) to announce the start of Company rule in Rhodesia. The day was formulated as a public holiday in 1920 under the Bank Holiday Amendment Ordinance as Occupation Day where it was intended to replace Shangani Day. In 1961, it was renamed as Pioneers' Day. The commemoration continued during Rhodesia's unrecognised unilateral independence but following the establishment of Zimbabwe, as part of a Robert Mugabe led campaign to Africanise the country, the holiday was abolished.

== Celebrations ==
The focal point of the celebrations was the re-enactment of the raising of the Union Jack at Cecil Square in Salisbury. The ceremony would be complemented by military parades and a Christian service of thanksgiving. This would be repeated yearly with the original pioneers and their descendants usually being present alongside the Prime Minister of Rhodesia. Following Rhodesia's Unilateral Declaration of Independence in 1965, in 1968 it was announced that there would be a new flag of Rhodesia created. Initially it was unknown if this would replace the Union Jack during Pioneers' Day celebrations and the Pioneer and Early Settlers Society petitioned Prime Minister Ian Smith to ensure that the Union Jack continued to be raised. It was agreed that the Union Jack would continue to be the flag raised during the ceremonies in order to honour the pioneers. The flag would traditionally be raised by a descendant of a pioneer who served in either the Rhodesian Security Forces or in the British South Africa Police.
