= James ffolliott Darling =

Irish trooper and naturalist

James Johnston ffolliott Darling (December 1859 – April 1929) was an Irish trooper and naturalist.

== Early life ==
James ffolliott Darling was born in December 1859 in Blackrock, Dublin. His father was John Singleton Darling of Clonakilty, Manager of the National Bank of Ireland. James Darling studied to become a physician, though he failed his final examinations while studying at Trinity College Dublin.

== Career ==
Darling emigrated to South Africa, serving in the Cape Mounted Riflemen from 1883 to 1886, after which he was a pharmacist in Kimberley, Northern Cape. Next, he became an assayer in Johannesburg. He was granted a farm in Mutare in 1891, which was called Darlington Farm. From 1895 – 1896, he was a miner at claims along the Mazowe River. He was a lieutenant in the Salisbury Field Force, through which he participated in the Mazowe Patrol.

== Later life and death ==
After his retirement, he returned to Ireland and became a gentleman farmer. He became a member of the Dublin Zoological Society and the London Zoological Society, and was involved in the Shannon hydroelectric scheme. He died at "Hoop Hill", his residence in Lurgan, in April 1929 at the age of 69.

== Personal life ==
Darling was married to Hilda Maxwell, and the couple had two sons. After his death, she married the entomologist Guy Anstruther Knox Marshall in 1933.

== Honors and awards ==
Darling was awarded the British South Africa Company Medal with two clasps: Mashonaland 1890 and Rhodesia 1896. He was also awarded a medal for the Diamond Jubilee of Queen Victoria in 1897. He received the Jubilee Medal as one of twelve former members of the Pioneer Column chosen out of 200 applicants to participate in the Queen's parade.

Darling was also a naturalist and a scientific collector. He had several species named after him, including Darling's horseshoe bat (Rhinolophus darlingi), the Mashona mole-rat (Fukomys darlingi), the frog Amnirana darlingi, and the spider Solpugyla darlingii.
