= Darling's horseshoe bat =

Conservation status
- Least Concern (IUCN 3.1)

Scientific classification
- Kingdom: Animalia
- Phylum: Chordata
- Class: Mammalia
- Order: Chiroptera
- Family: Rhinolophidae
- Genus: Rhinolophus
- Species: R. darlingi

Binomial name
- Rhinolophus darlingi K. Andersen, 1905
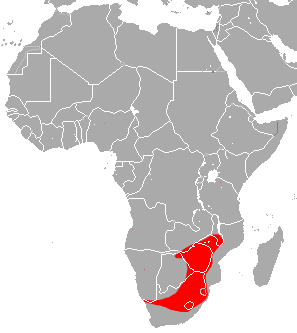
- Darling's horseshoe bat range

Species of bat

Darling's horseshoe bat (Rhinolophus darlingi) is a species of bat in the family Rhinolophidae found in Africa. Its natural habitats are dry savanna, caves and other subterranean habitats.

== Taxonomy ==
Darling's horseshoe bat was described as a new species in 1905 by Danish mammalogist Knud Andersen. The holotype had been collected in the village of Mazowe in Zimbabwe by James ffolliott Darling, who is the eponym for its species name "darlingi".

== Description ==
Darling's horseshoe bat is considered medium-sized for an African horseshoe bat, with a forearm length of 42–51 mm (1.7–2.0 in) and weights of 6–13 g (0.21–0.46 oz). It has soft, fluffy fur. The coloration on its back is gray or grayish-brown, while its belly is pale gray. It has a low aspect ratio and very low wing loading, meaning that its flight speed is likely slow but highly maneuverable.

== Range and habitat ==
Darling's horseshoe bat is widely distributed in southern Africa, where it has been documented in Angola, Botswana, Burundi, Democratic Republic of the Congo, Eswatini, Kenya, Malawi, Mozambique, Namibia, South Africa, Tanzania, Zambia, and Zimbabwe. It might also be found in Lesotho and Nigeria. It is mostly associated with savanna habitats. It roosts in caves, rocky outcrops, mines, and human structures.
