= Company rule in Rhodesia =

Rule of the British South Africa Company in Rhodesia (1888–1964)

Rhodesia
- 1890–1924
- Company flag Company coat of arms
- Motto: "Justice, Commerce, Freedom"
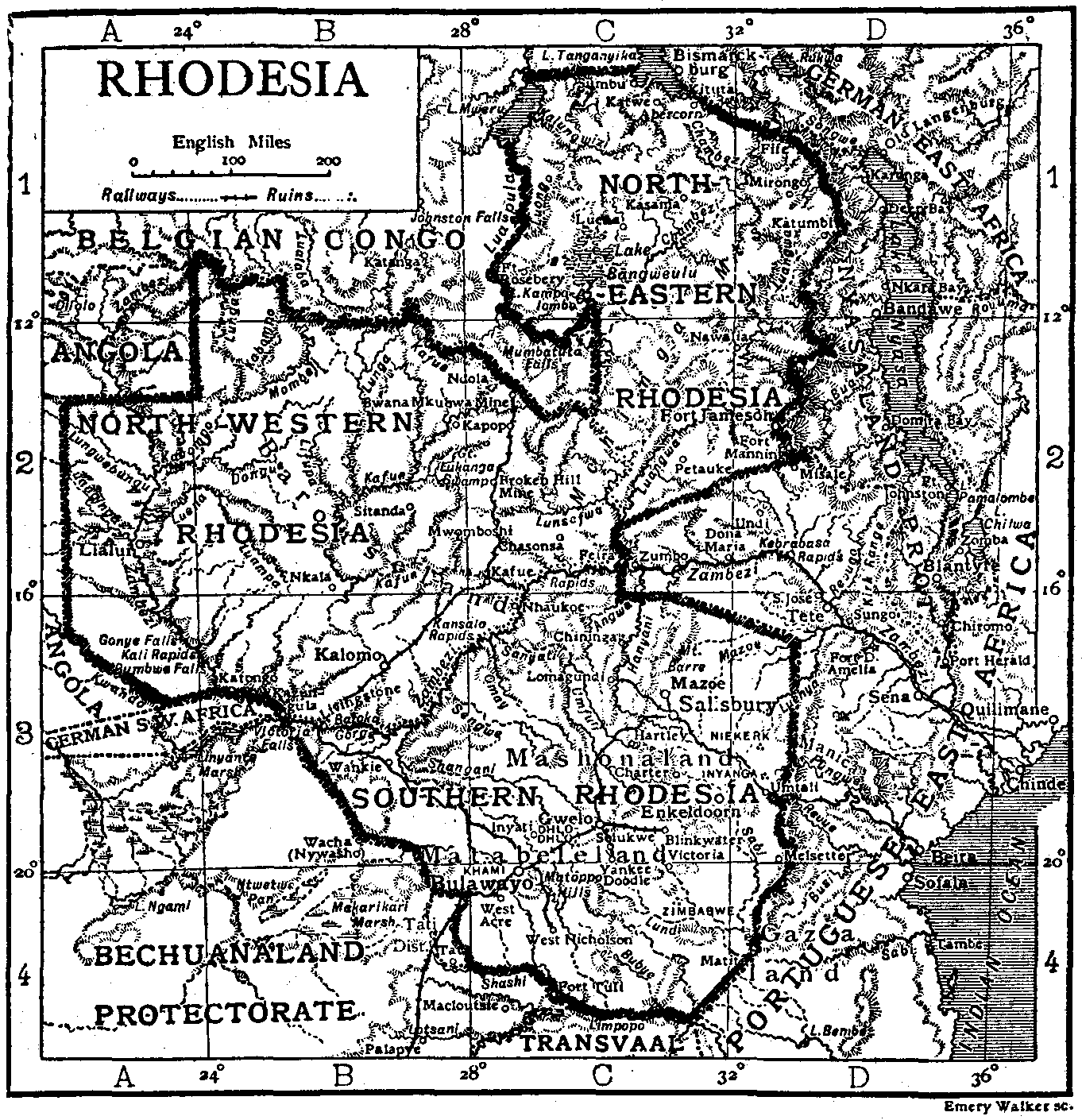
- Rhodesia under Company rule in the 1911 Encyclopædia Britannica
- Status: Chartered territory of the British South Africa Company
- Capital: Salisbury
- Common languages: English (official); Shona, Northern Ndebele, Bemba and Chewa widely spoken
- Historical era: New Imperialism
  - Chartered: 1888
  - Pioneer Column; start of Company rule: 1890
  - Named "Rhodesia": 1895
  - Responsible government for Southern Rhodesia: 1923
  - Direct British rule for Northern Rhodesia: 1924
- Currency: Pound sterling
Preceded by	Succeeded by
Mthwakazi	Northern Rhodesia; Southern Rhodesia
- Today part of: Zambia^{1}; Zimbabwe^{2}
- ^{1}Northern Rhodesia became Zambia in 1964.; ^{2}Southern Rhodesia began to call itself Rhodesia in 1964, then Zimbabwe Rhodesia in 1979. It has been Zimbabwe since 1980.

The British South Africa Company's administration of what became Rhodesia was chartered in 1889 by Queen Victoria of the United Kingdom, and began with the Pioneer Column's march north-east to Mashonaland in 1890. Empowered by its charter to acquire, govern and develop the area north of the Transvaal in southern Africa, the Company, headed by Cecil Rhodes, raised its own armed forces and carved out a huge bloc of territory through treaties, concessions and occasional military action, most prominently overcoming the Matabele army in the First and Second Matabele Wars of the 1890s. (Note: The Ndebele people's term for themselves in their own language is amaNdebele (the prefix ama- indicating the plural form of the singular Ndebele), whence comes the English term "Matabele". Their language is called isiNdebele, generally rendered "Sindebele" in English. For clarity, consistency and ease of reading, this article uses the term "Matabele" to refer to the people, and calls their language "Sindebele".) By the turn of the century, Rhodes's Company held a vast, land-locked country, bisected by the Zambezi river. It officially named this land Rhodesia in 1895, and ran it until the early 1920s.

The area south of the Zambezi became Southern Rhodesia, while that to the north became North-Western and North-Eastern Rhodesia, which were joined in 1911 to form Northern Rhodesia. Within Northern Rhodesia, there was a separate Kingdom called Barotseland which later became a British protectorate alongside other territories under the British sphere of influence. Each territory was administered separately, with an administrator heading each territorial legislature. In Southern Rhodesia, which attracted the most white immigrants and developed fastest, a legislative council was established in 1898. This comprised a blend of Company-nominated officials and elected members, with the numbers of each fluctuating over time.

Partially motivated by Rhodes's dream of a Cape to Cairo Railway, railway and telegraph lines were laid across previously barren Rhodesia with great speed, linking South Africa to the Belgian Congo's southern Katanga province by 1910. The British South Africa Police, responsible for law enforcement in Southern Rhodesia, was established in 1896. A number of police forces north of the river amalgamated to form the Northern Rhodesia Police in 1911. Northern and Southern Rhodesians fought alongside the British in the Second Boer War and the First World War; about 40% of Southern Rhodesian white men fought in the latter, mostly on the Western Front in Europe. Black soldiers served in East Africa with the Rhodesia Native Regiment.

As the number of elected members in the Legislative Council rose, power in Southern Rhodesia gradually transferred from complete Company rule to effective self-government by the growing number of white settlers. In a 1922 referendum, Southern Rhodesians chose responsible government within the British Empire over incorporation into the Union of South Africa. The Company's charter was duly revoked by Whitehall in 1923, and Southern Rhodesia became a self-governing colony of Britain in October that year. Northern Rhodesia became a directly-run British protectorate in April 1924.

== Origins ==
=== Rhodes' dream ===
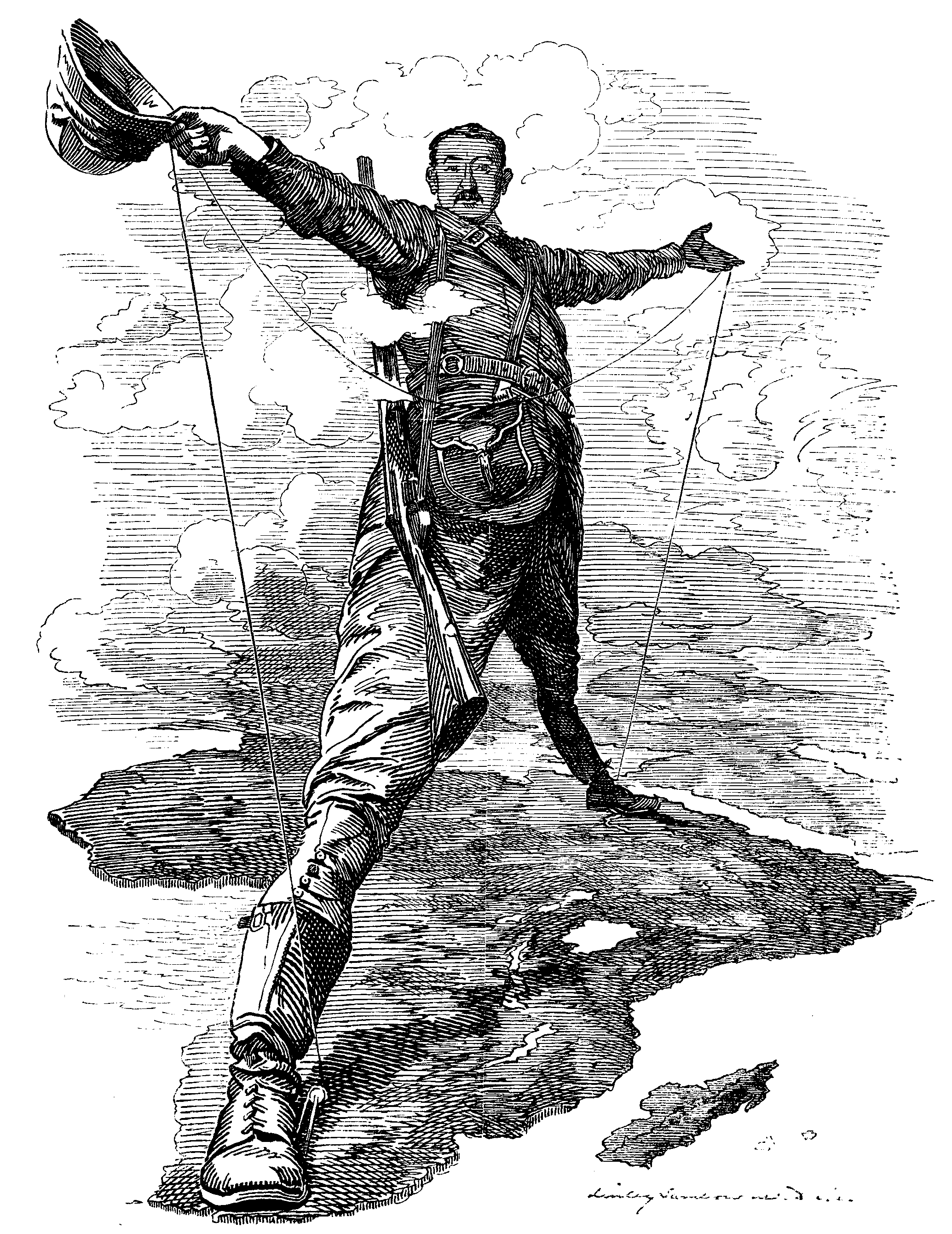
"The Rhodes Colossus", a figurative 1892 depiction of Cecil Rhodes as a giant astride Africa, connecting the Cape and Cairo by telegraph

Amid the Scramble for Africa during the 1880s, the South African-based businessman and politician Cecil Rhodes envisioned the annexation to the British Empire of a bloc of territory connecting the Cape of Good Hope and Cairo—respectively at the southern and northern tips of Africa—and the concurrent construction of a line of rail linking the two. On geopolitical maps, British territories were generally marked in red or pink, so this concept became known as the "Cape to Cairo red line". In the immediate vicinity of the Cape, this ambition was challenged by the presence of independent states to the north-east of Britain's Cape Colony: there were several Boer Republics, and to the north of these was the Kingdom of Matabeleland, ruled by Lobengula. (Note: In 1890, Lobengula's kingdom was about half a century old. The Matabele had previously made up part of the Zulu Kingdom; Mzilikazi, Lobengula's father, had exiled with his followers by King Shaka around 1823. They initially settled in the Transvaal, becoming known as the Ndebele or Matabele. The arrival of Afrikaners to the area in 1836 precipitated a conflict that saw the Matabele migrate further north in 1838. They established themselves across the Limpopo River, in what henceforth became called Matabeleland. Zulu customs and military traditions endured among the Matabele, as did the Zulu language, which evolved into Sindebele. Lobengula once told an English visitor that "The proper name for my people is Zulu.") Having secured the Rudd Concession on mining rights from Lobengula in October 1888, Rhodes and his British South Africa Company were granted a Royal Charter by Queen Victoria in October 1889. The Company was empowered under this charter to trade with local rulers, form banks, own and manage land and to raise and run a police force. In return for these rights, the Company would govern and develop any territory it acquired, while respecting laws enacted by extant African rulers, and upholding free trade within its borders.

=== North to the Zambezi; territorial rivalry with Portugal ===
The projected Company sphere was initially Matabeleland and its immediate neighbours between the Limpopo River and the Zambezi. Portugal's colonies in Angola and Mozambique, coastal territories respectively to the west and east of this general area, were over three centuries old, and Lisbon's alliance with Britain formally dated back to the 1386 Treaty of Windsor. However, the exceedingly lethargic pace of local Portuguese colonisation and development was such that even in the 1880s, Portugal's dominions in Mozambique comprised only a few scattered ports, harbours and plantations, all of which were administered from the island of Mozambique, just north of the Mozambique Channel. Angola differed little, with gigantic tracts of hinterland coming under the largely nominal purview of Portugal's modest colony on the coast.

Rhodes quietly planned to annex some of Mozambique into the Company domain so he could establish a major port at the mouth of the Pungwe River. He thought this might make an ideal sea outlet for his proposed settlement in Mashonaland, the area directly to Matabeleland's north-east where Lobengula held dominion over many Mashona chiefs. Rhodes believed that the Portuguese claim to Mozambique was tenuous enough that he could win much of it without provoking major ire: "the occupation of the Portuguese even along the coast line is in most places merely a paper one," he wrote to Whitehall in late 1889, "and if this has not been recognised by international agreement I think it might be left open." But contrary to Rhodes's opinion, general consensus at the Berlin Conference of 1884–85 had made Portugal's hold over the Mozambican coastline very secure. The Portuguese had expanded inland during the late 1880s, creating Manicaland in the eastern Mashona country. They founded Beira, a port on Rhodes's proposed Pungwe site, in 1890. Portugal issued the so-called "Pink Map" around this time, laying claim to the very corridor of land between Angola and Mozambique that Rhodes desired. The British government issued a firm ultimatum against the Portuguese claims in January 1890; Lisbon swiftly acquiesced and left the area open for the Company's drive north.

== Territorial expansion and consolidation ==
=== Pioneer Column ===
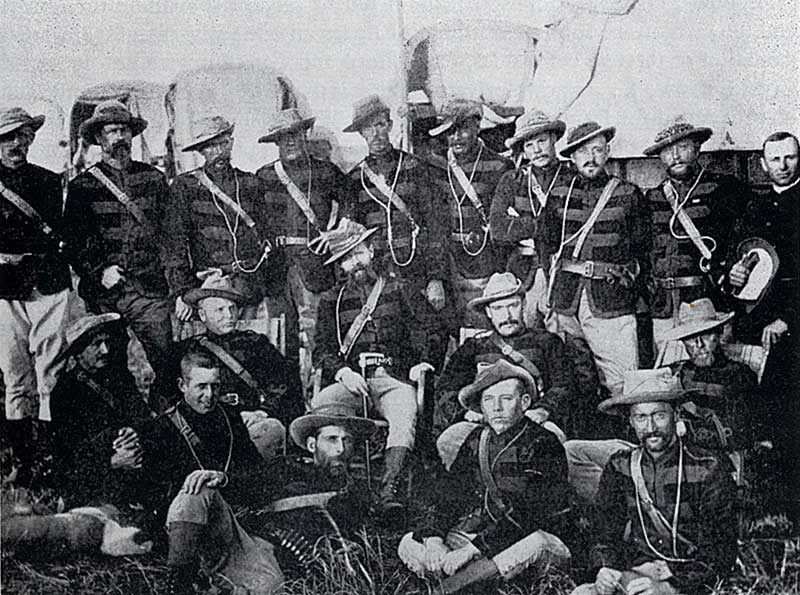
Officers of the Pioneer Column. The column was mostly South African and spanned almost all corners of society.

The Pioneer Column, initially comprising about 100 volunteers referred to as "pioneers", was raised by the Company during 1890. Led by Major Frank Johnson, a 23-year-old adventurer, the column was designed by the Company to be the instrument by which it would not only acquire Mashonaland, but also begin its development. Men from a wide variety of backgrounds therefore filled its ranks; according to one member, "prospectors predominate, but nearly every trade and profession under the sun is represented ... one troop is called the gentlemanly troop because the majority in it are brokers". Most of the pioneers self-identified as South African rather than British, and many of them were Afrikaners. At Rhodes's insistence, several sons of the Cape Colony's leading families were also included. Each pioneer was promised 3,000 acres (12 km^{2}) of land and 15 mining claims in return for his service.

Lobengula gave his approval to the ostensibly non-military expedition, but many of his izinDuna (advisors) were fiercely against it, seeing it as an appropriation of Matabele territory. Wary that one or more of these izinDuna might turn rogue and attack the pioneers, the Company gradually enlarged the escorting detachment of British South Africa Company's Police until it numbered 500 men, headed by Lieutenant-Colonel Edward Pennefather, an officer seconded from the British Army. To Johnson's chagrin, the Imperial officer was also given ultimate command of the column.

The column was to move roughly east from Macloutsie, a small camp near the border of Matabeleland and Bechuanaland, and then march north to its destination. It would build a road as it went, founding minor forts along the way, and establish a major town in Mashonaland, whereupon the pioneers would be released to farm, prospect and trade. Frederick Courteney Selous, a famed hunter with intimate knowledge of Mashonaland, was made the column's "intelligence officer". He chose as its intended destination an open patch of veld he had discovered during his travels, which he called Mount Hampden. The proposed site was about 650 kilometres (400 mi) to the north-east of Macloutsie. The column departed on 28 June 1890, and on 11 July crossed the Tuli River into Matabeleland. Its first settlement, Fort Tuli, was inaugurated near the riverbank. Though Johnson was nominally in command of the pioneers, he was generally seen as untried and green when contrasted with the experienced, respected authority of Selous. According to most contemporary accounts, Selous was effectively in control. The officers were outwardly harmonious, but Johnson was privately troubled by pangs of jealousy.

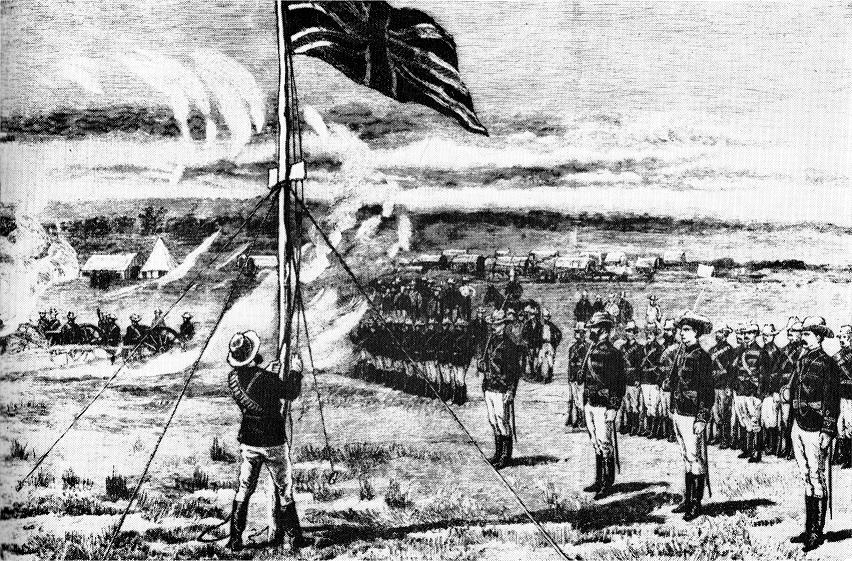
The Union Jack was raised over Fort Salisbury on 13 September 1890.

The column was initially accompanied by about 200 Ngwato provided by the Tswana chief Khama, who had firmly aligned his country with Britain. The Ngwato provided much assistance in building the new road, but animosity soon developed between them and the whites, principally because the latter were not used to treating blacks as equals. By mutual consent, the Ngwato returned home. As the column continued its march north, Selous split off with a small section and headed east to challenge the Portuguese in Manicaland. Pennefather and Johnson continued at the head of the main force and founded Fort Victoria, Fort Charter, and, on 12 September, Fort Salisbury.

The site of Salisbury was a naturally flat and marshy meadow, bounded by a rough kopje. The pioneers were about 15 kilometres (9.3 mi) short of Mount Hampden, but Pennefather climbed the kopje, surveyed the open veld and insisted that it was "magnificent", so they need go no further. He reported back to Rhodes in triumphant tones: "Site selected ... All well. Magnificent country. Natives pleased to see us". On the morning of 13 September 1890, about 10:00, the officers and men of the Pioneer Column paraded atop the kopje before an improvised flagstaff. With the column standing to attention, Lieutenant Edward Tyndale-Biscoe hoisted the Union Jack, a 21-gun salute was fired, and three cheers were given for the Queen. Work then began on the fort, which was completed by the end of September. The Pioneer Column was then disbanded.

=== Eastern skirmishes with Portugal ===
Instructed by Rhodes to hurry east, Selous met with the Manica chief, Mtassa, on 14 September 1890, and agreed with him a concession whereby Mtassa promised not to ally with any other foreign power, and granted the Company exclusive rights to mine within his territory, as well as to build railways, bridges, canals and other projects typical of colonial settlement. In return, the Company gave Mtassa rifles and other equipment (worth £100 in total), and a promise of protection against attacks by the Portuguese or the neighbouring Shangaan (or Tsonga) people. Portugal despatched a small force to militarily overwhelm Mtassa and reclaim the area in early November 1890.

Captain Patrick Forbes rode to Mtassa's aid from Salisbury, quickly routed the Portuguese, and thereupon advanced all the way to Beira, securing further concessions from local chiefs along the way to build a railroad. Tense negotiations between Britain and Portugal followed, finally concluding with a treaty signed in Lisbon on 11 June 1891: prominent among the numerous territorial revisions was the integration of Manicaland into the Company domain as part of Mashonaland. Britain concurrently recognised Portugal's authority over the entire Mozambican coast, putting an end to Rhodes's designs for a Company port on the Mozambique Channel.

=== North to Katanga ===
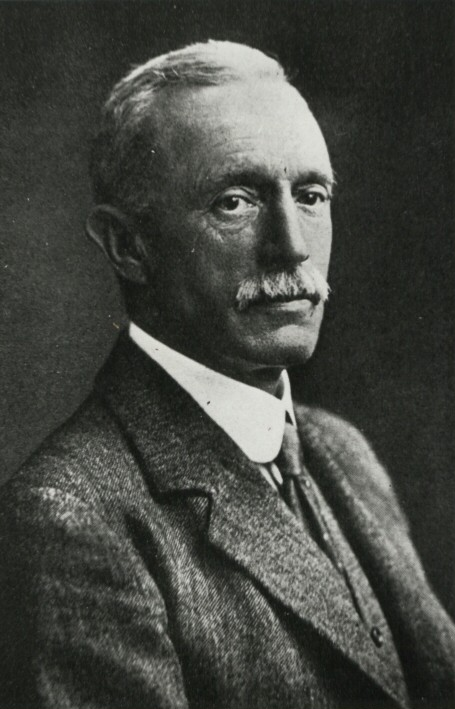
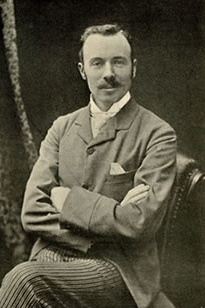
Alfred Sharpe (left) and Joseph Thomson (right) attempted to bring Katanga into the Company sphere, but were thwarted by agents of King Leopold II of the Belgians. Rhodes's drive north was thereby halted.

Representatives of the Company crossed the Zambezi to venture even further north. The Shire Highlands of Nyasaland, far to the north-east on the banks of Lake Nyasa, had been settled by a modest number of British missionaries for about a decade, and in Barotseland, to the north-west, King Lewanika hosted François Coillard of the Paris Evangelical Missionary Society. Rhodes sent Elliot Lochner north to negotiate with Lewanika in late 1889, and in June 1890 the king signed the Lochner Concession, which gave the Company rights to mine, trade and build railways in Barotseland in return for British protection over his domain from external threats, and a British resident in Lewandika's court at Lealui. The British government thereupon chartered the Company to defend Barotseland, as well as all country to the east as far as Nyasaland, and to the north as far as Lake Tanganyika and Katanga.

A country where resources were scarce and tropical disease was rampant, Barotseland offered comparatively few economic opportunities for the Company and little incentive for white immigration. The main objective of Lochner's expedition was all along to clear a path towards Katanga, a mineral-rich area further north, where Msiri ruled the Yeke Kingdom. Katanga was also coveted by the owner of the Congo Free State, King Leopold II of the Belgians, whose representatives Rhodes hoped to beat there. "I want you to get Msiri's," Rhodes told one of his agents, Joseph Thomson; "I mean Katanga ... You must go and get Katanga."

The efforts of Thomson and Alfred Sharpe to secure a Company concession over the area were furiously rebuffed by Msiri in late 1890, and ultimately foiled by the 1891–92 Stairs Expedition—a multinational force in Leopold's service, led by a Canadian British Army officer, Captain William Grant Stairs—which violently clashed with the obstreperous Msiri, and eventually shot him dead when an attempt to arrest him turned into a firefight. Msiri had been in the habit of displaying the heads of his enemies atop poles outside his boma (enclosure), and the expedition's men hoisted his own head alongside them in an attempt to strike fear into the locals. The country promptly capitulated to the Free State, ending the Company's expansion north.

The Company did little to fulfil Britain's obligations to Lewandika; having failed in Katanga, its hierarchy saw Barotseland as an unworkable inconvenience that might later be exchanged with Portugal. Whitehall, by contrast, regarded Lewandika's domain as an important buffer against further Portuguese claims inland. Neither the Company nor the British government proved eager to take practical responsibility for the Barotse; in 1894, while informing Britain of his willingness to administer on Whitehall's behalf north of the Zambezi, Rhodes stressed that he would not take Barotseland. The promised British resident at Lealui remained conspicuously absent, despite Lewandika's repeated enquiries, until the appointment by Rhodes of Robert Thorne Coryndon in 1897.

=== Matabele Wars; the First Chimurenga ===
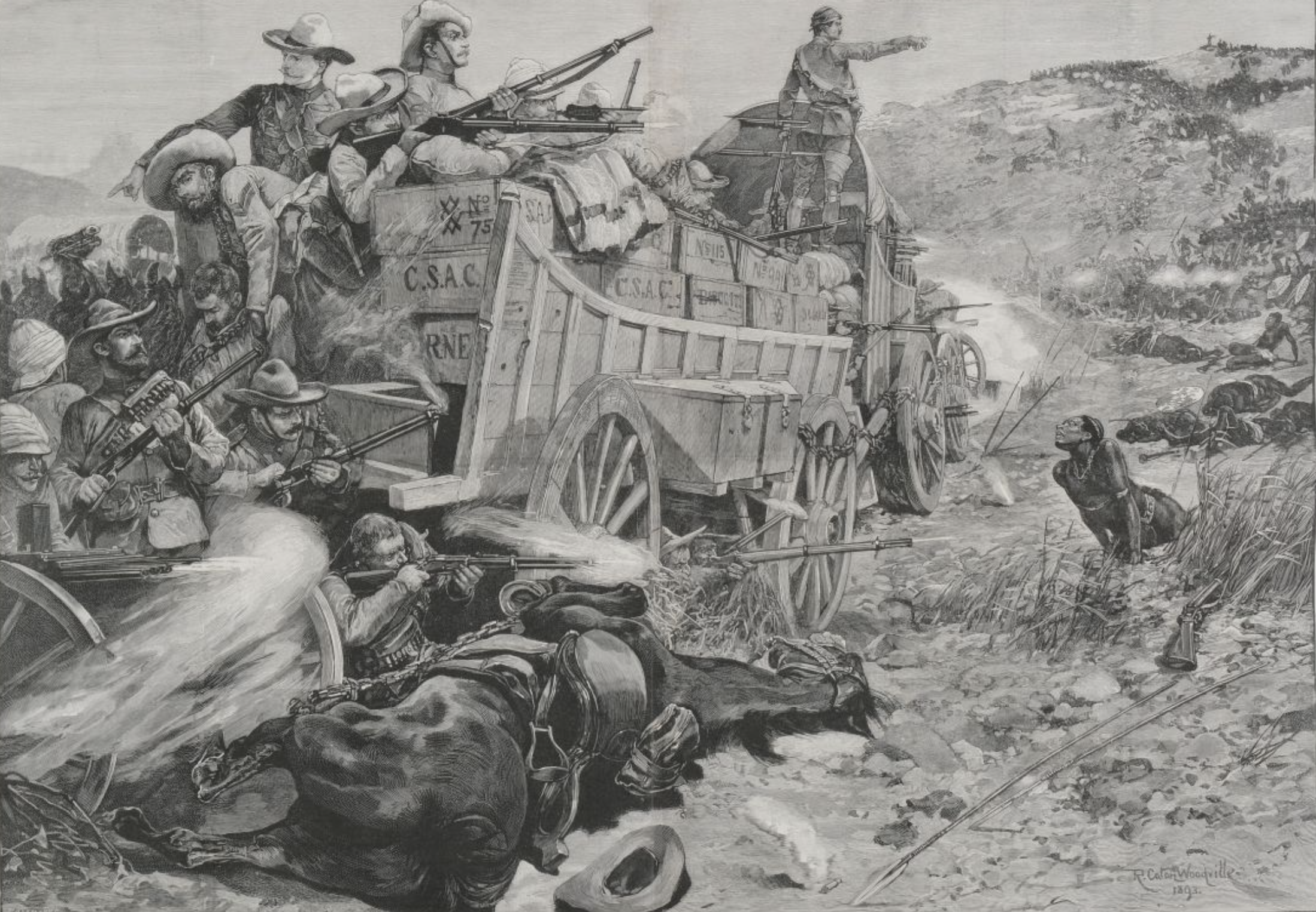
At the Battle of the Shangani on 25 October 1893, 700 Company soldiers with five Maxim machine guns defeated 3,500 Matabele warriors.

Though the Company made good on most of the pledges it had made to local leaders in Matabeleland, the assent of Lobengula and other less prominent figures, particularly regarding mining rights, was often evaded, misrepresented or simply ignored. Company officials also demanded that Lobengula cease the habitual raids on Mashona villages by Matabele impis (regiments). Enraged by what he perceived as slights against his authority, Lobengula made war on Mashonaland in 1893. Matabele warriors began the wholesale slaughter of Mashonas near Fort Victoria in July that year. The Company organised an indaba (tribal conference) to try to end the conflict, but this failed. The First Matabele War had begun.

The Company moved on Lobengula during October and early November 1893, and used the inexorable firepower of its Maxim machine guns to crush attacks by the far larger Matabele army as it rode south-west. As the whites approached his royal town at Bulawayo, Lobengula fled, torching it as he went. (Note: This was in keeping with tribal custom; the royal towns of Matabele kings were never intended to be permanent. The capital moved whenever a king died, or as soon as local sources of water and food were exhausted. The old royal town was always burned when this happened to prevent the medicines kept there from falling into the hands of witches. The Bulawayo burned on 3 November 1893 was the second of Lobengula's royal towns; the first, also called Bulawayo, was founded in 1870 and destroyed in 1881. The name "Bulawayo" dated back even further; Lobengula's father, Mzilikazi, took it from the Zulu capital of the 1820s.) Company troops were despatched to bring him back, and the resultant pursuit north ended with the ambush and annihilation of the 34-man Shangani Patrol by the remnants of Lobengula's army on 4 December 1893. The king died from smallpox while on his way north in January 1894, and his izinDuna made peace with the Company soon after. Bulawayo was rebuilt as a Company-run city atop the ruins of the former Matabele capital. Rhodes subsequently funded education for three of Lobengula's sons.

The Matabele rose again in 1896 at the behest of Mlimo, a spiritualist leader who was revered as a god by much of the local populace. The botched Jameson Raid on the Transvaal at the end of 1895 had severely depleted the Company's garrison in Matabeleland, and the settlers in Bulawayo had little to defend themselves with. Mlimo convinced his followers that the white man was responsible for all their ills—hut tax, forced work, locusts, rinderpest, drought and so on—and that he and other tribal prophets could ensure the success of a massed rebellion by turning the settlers' bullets into water. This uprising, called the Second Matabele War or the First Chimurenga (liberation war), began in March 1896. Over the following three months the Matabele killed hundreds of isolated settlers and their families, but Bulawayo itself held out. When the Company mustered reinforcements from South Africa, the Matabele retreated into the Matopos Hills; here Frederick Russell Burnham, an American scout long in Company service, discovered and killed Mlimo in June 1896.

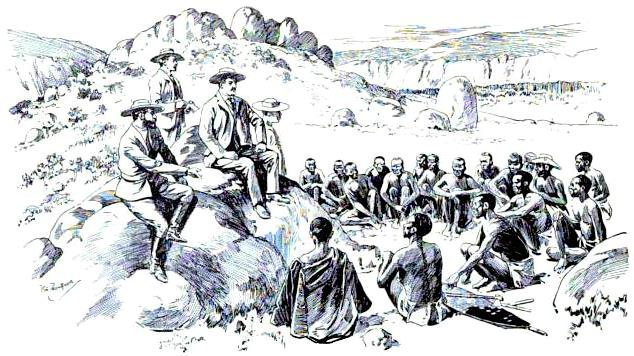
Rhodes and the Matabele izinDuna make peace in the Matopos Hills, as depicted by Robert Baden-Powell, 1896.

Starting in August 1896, Rhodes personally played a key role in ending the Matabele insurgency. With one of the widows of Mzilikazi (Lobengula's father) acting as a go-between, the Company and the rebel izinDuna arranged an indaba for 21 August: the izinDuna agreed to meet Rhodes and three companions in the Matopos Hills. (Note: Rhodes chose to accompany him Johannes Colenbrander, who acted as an interpreter, a reporter from The Times of London and a personal friend.) At this meeting, the insurgents vehemently protested against their prior treatment under Company rule, prompting Rhodes to walk away from the other whites and to sit among the Matabele instead, apparently intending to symbolically demonstrate empathy and a spirit of reconciliation. He told the Matabele that he was on their side, and that he would personally ensure the non-recurrence of any abuses. The izinDuna would be fully restored to the status they had held under Lobengula, he said, and there would be no retribution against those who had taken part in the Chimurenga. After four hours, it was agreed to continue the talks. Bitterness endured among some of the rebels, but three further indabas progressed well, and the Matabele rising ended amicably in October 1896.

Around the same time, Mashona svikiro (spiritualist prophets), most prominently Mukwati, Kaguvi and Nehanda Nyakasikana, instigated their own Chimurenga in Mashonaland. The Company forcibly put down this uprising during 1897, and afterwards took significant steps to demilitarise the tribal population and improve relations with the local chiefs. Small pockets of Mashona unrest continued sporadically until 1903, but peace endured in Matabeleland. Including both theatres, the Chimurenga has been estimated to have taken around 8,450 lives; roughly 8,000 blacks died, and about 450 whites, of whom 372 were locally based settlers. The rest were soldiers in Company or British service from outside Rhodesia.

== Administration ==
=== The name "Rhodesia" ===
The Company initially referred to each territory it acquired by its respective name—Mashonaland, Matabeleland and so on—but there was no official term for them collectively. Rhodes preferred the name "Zambesia" while Leander Starr Jameson proposed "Charterland". Many of the first settlers instead called their new home "Rhodesia", after Rhodes; this was common enough usage by 1891 for it to be used in newspapers. In 1892 it was used in the name of Salisbury's first newspaper, The Rhodesia Herald. The Company officially adopted the name Rhodesia in 1895, and three years later the UK government followed suit. "It is not clear why the name should have been pronounced with the emphasis on the second rather than the first syllable," the late historian Robert Blake commented, "but this appears to have been the custom from the beginning and it never changed."

=== Administrative divisions and centres ===
Matabeleland and Mashonaland, both of which lay south of the Zambezi, were officially referred to collectively as "Southern Rhodesia" from 1898, and formally united under that name in 1901. Meanwhile, the areas to the river's north became North-Western and North-Eastern Rhodesia, which were governed separately, and amalgamated in 1911 to form Northern Rhodesia.

The overall centre of Company administration was Salisbury, which was also the Southern Rhodesian capital. The administrative centre in North-Eastern Rhodesia was Fort Jameson, while in North-Western Rhodesia the capital was Kalomo initially, and Livingstone from 1907. Livingstone became the capital of Northern Rhodesia when the two northern territories joined in 1911, and remained so at the end of Company rule.

=== Administrative posts, politics and legislature ===
The head of government in each territory under Company rule was in effect a regional administrator appointed by the Company. In Southern Rhodesia, a ten-man Legislative Council first sat in 1899, originally made up of the administrator himself, five other members nominated by the Company, and four elected by registered voters. The number of elected members rose gradually under Company rule until they numbered 13 in 1920, sitting alongside the administrator and six other Company officials in the 20-member Legislative Council. The Company's Royal Charter was originally due to run out in October 1914, but it was renewed for a further ten years in 1915.

In Northern Rhodesia, administration was entirely undertaken by the Company until 1917, when an Advisory Council was introduced, comprising five elected members. This council did little to lighten the Company's administrative burden north of the river, but endured until the end of Company rule.

== Development ==
=== Railways and the telegraph ===
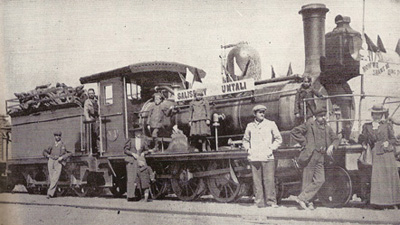
The railroad from Salisbury to Umtali—ultimately bound for Beira on the Mozambican coast—opened in 1899.

Chief among the endeavours pursued by the Company during its early years were the construction of railroads and telegraph wires across the territory it governed. These respective arteries of transport and communication, vital both for the successful development of the new country and for the realisation of Rhodes's Cape to Cairo dream, were laid across the previously bare Rhodesian landscape with great speed. Strategically planned, the railways were not intended or expected to turn a profit during their early years; their construction was largely subsidised by the Company. The telegraph line from Mafeking in South Africa reached Salisbury—one third of the way from Cape Town to Cairo—in February 1892. Just under six years later, in December 1897, the Bechuanaland railway from Vryburg reached Bulawayo, making it possible to travel between the Cape and Rhodesia by train.

A narrow gauge railway towards Salisbury from the Mozambican port of Beira was begun by the Portuguese in 1892, and reached the Rhodesian border at Umtali after six years. Umtali and Salisbury were linked in 1899, on a different track gauge; the gauges between Beira and Salisbury were regularised the following year. The Second Boer War then restricted the further extension of the line from Vryburg, but the completion of the Beira–Salisbury railway allowed the importation of materials. Salisbury was connected to Bulawayo and the Cape in 1902. The Vryburg–Bulawayo railway was meanwhile extended up to the Zambezi, and across when the Victoria Falls Bridge opened in 1905. Continuing through North-Western Rhodesia, the railway reached Élisabethville in Katanga—by this time part of the Belgian Congo—in 1910.

=== Agriculture and land distribution: the rise of Rhodesian tobacco ===
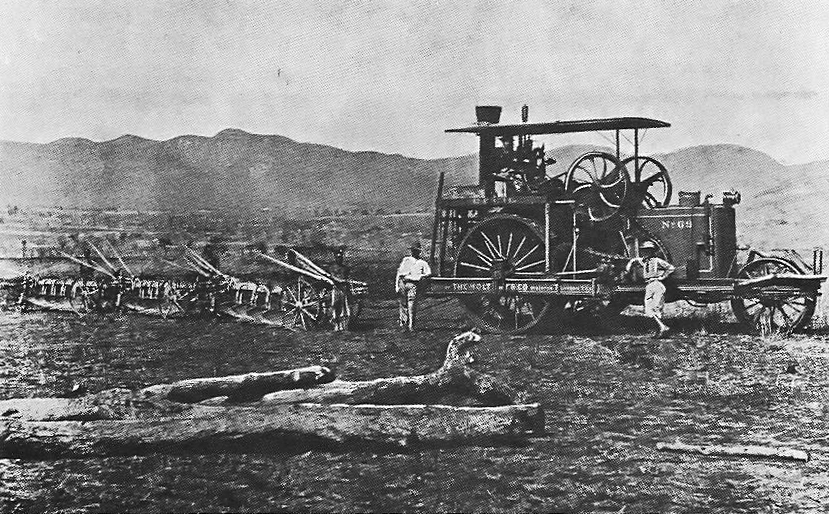
White farming on the Pioneer Citrus Estate, near Umtali, in the 1910s

The Company originally hoped that gold prospecting between the Limpopo and Zambezi rivers would reveal mineral deposits comparable to those of the South African Rand, and indeed acquired its charter in part because its founders convinced Whitehall that a "second Rand" would be found and exploited in what would become Southern Rhodesia, thereby providing more than enough capital to develop the territory without help from London. Though much gold was discovered during the 1890s, these grand expectations were not met. The Company resolved after about a decade that it could not financially sustain its domain through gold mining alone, and therefore shifted its priority to the development of white agriculture.

To maximise the potential of new, white-run farms, the Company launched a wide-scale land settlement programme for white settlers. As part of this drive it reorganised the geographical distribution of native reserve areas, moving the reserves and often reducing them in size where the land was of particularly high quality. To ensure that the white farmers would retain the reliable access to markets that the nascent railway network provided, tribal reserve boundaries in various relevant places were redrawn by the Company to place the railway lines outside. The new hut taxes concurrently compelled black peasants to find paid work, which could be found in the new agricultural industry, though most tribesmen were reluctant to abandon their traditional lifestyles in favour of the capitalist labour market. Managers at farms and mines often had great trouble sourcing sufficient manpower.

Tobacco, initially just one of several crops earmarked for wholesale production, soon emerged as Southern Rhodesia's most prominent agricultural product, though its early development was far from stable: aside from the climactic uncertainties of the unfamiliar country and the mercurial quality of the product, the early industry was cursed by a debilitating boom and bust cycle that continued well into the 1920s. All the same, tobacco endured as the territory's staple crop, while the growers came to dominate Southern Rhodesian politics, holding a majority in the Legislative Council from 1911. Holding considerable political and economic power up to the end of Company rule in 1923, the Southern Rhodesian tobacco industry retained its prominent position for decades afterwards.

=== Immigration and economic performance ===
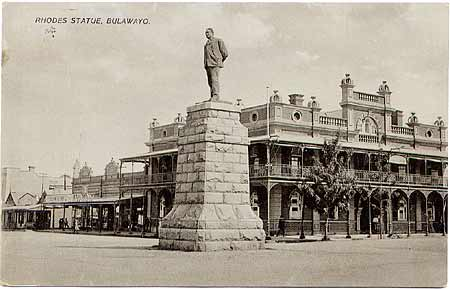
Statue of Rhodes in Bulawayo, 1920s

White immigration to the Company realm was initially modest, but intensified during the 1900s and early-1910s, particularly south of the Zambezi. The economic slump in the Cape following the Second Boer War motivated many White South Africans to move to Southern Rhodesia, and from about 1907 the Company's land settlement programme encouraged more immigrants to stay for good. The Southern Rhodesian mining and farming industries advanced considerably during this period; Southern Rhodesia's annual gold output grew in worth from £610,389 in 1901 to £2,526,007 in 1908. The territory first balanced revenue and expenditure in 1912. There were 12,586 Whites in Southern Rhodesia in 1904, and 23,606 in 1911; in 1927, four years after the end of Company rule, the Black and White populations in Southern Rhodesia were respectively 922,000 and 38,200.

The White population north of the river was far smaller, with only about 3,000 settlers spread across the 300,000 square miles (780,000 km^{2}) of Northern Rhodesia. In the same area, there were roughly 1,000,000 Black people. The Whites in Northern Rhodesia were primarily concentrated in the far west, along the railway line between Bulawayo and Élisabethville in the Belgian Congo. A community of about 250 lived in the vicinity of Fort Jameson near the eastern border. In between were vast swathes of largely uninhabited bush, which lacked roads, railways and telegraph lines, making communication between the two White communities very difficult. The amalgamation of North-Western and North-Eastern Rhodesia in 1911 did little to improve the situation. Northern Rhodesia suffered as the result of its artificial nature—the country was not homogeneous in terms of population, history or geography—and unlike Southern Rhodesia, it never turned a profit or became self-supporting. During 1921 alone, the Company's administration of Northern Rhodesia lost it more than £1,250,000.

== Military and police ==
=== Evolution of the Southern Rhodesian police ===
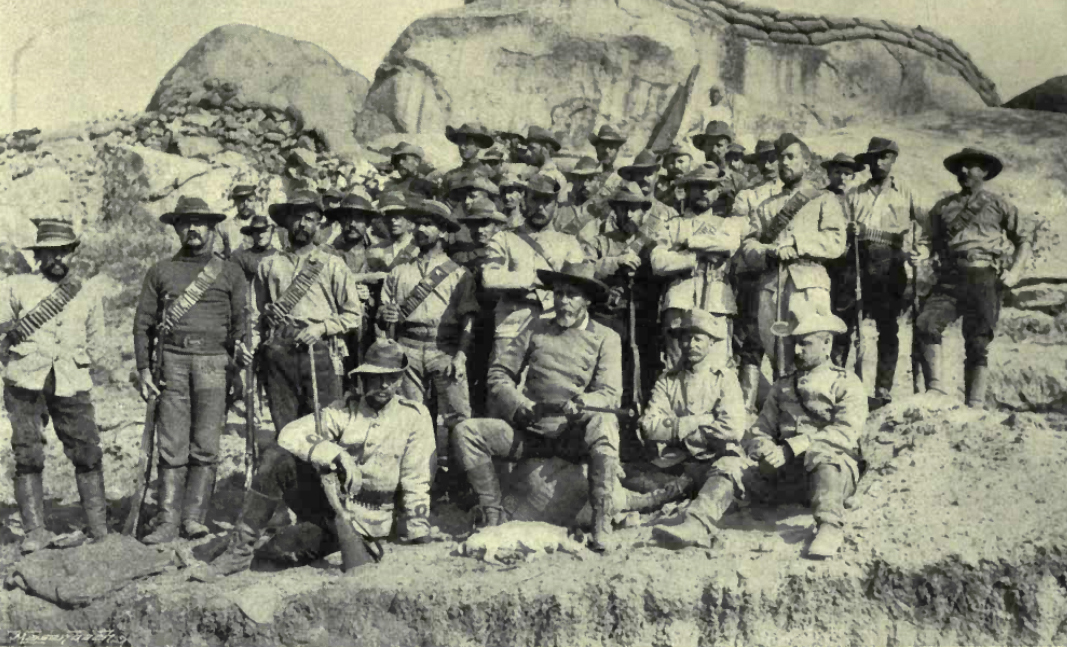
H Troop of the Bulawayo Field Force, commanded by Frederick Courteney Selous (front, seated), c. 1893

In line with the terms of its royal charter, the Company formed the British South Africa Company's Police (BSACP) in late 1889. A paramilitary, mounted infantry force, the BSACP initially boasted 650 men, but it proved so expensive to maintain that it was reduced to only 40 in 1892. This rump force was renamed the Mashonaland Mounted Police. With its size regularly fluctuating, it and other more irregular units—prominently the Bulawayo Field Force, including figures such as Selous and Burnham as commanders—proceeded to play a central role in the two Matabele Wars of the 1890s.

Following the formation of the Matabeleland Mounted Police in 1895 with 150 members, it and the Mashonaland force were collectively referred to as the Rhodesia Mounted Police. This was run directly by the Company until 1896, when it was reorganised into an independent entity called the British South Africa Police (BSAP). The word "Rhodesia" was omitted at the insistence of the British Colonial Secretary, Joseph Chamberlain, because Britain did not yet formally consider that the country's name, despite the Company's official adoption of it the year before. This anomaly was resolved in 1898 but the BSAP name remained.

Police forces in Southern Rhodesia were initially all-white, but this changed over time: the Native Police Force, first raised in May 1895, was made up entirely of Matabele non-commissioned officers and men, many of whom were veterans of Lobengula's impis. Its 200 members, of whom 50 were posted to Mashonaland, were trained in the Western manner, drilling and learning marksmanship. They were held in high regard by their white officers for their formidable soldiering ability, but they became hugely unpopular among the black civilian population for their perceived arrogance and abuse of the law they were supposed to uphold. At the 1896 indaba with Rhodes in the Matopos Hills, the Matabele chief Somabhulana complained at length about the native police, saying they did not respect the traditional tribal structure and generally oppressed the populace, reportedly raping women on a regular basis. The parties agreed to abolish the native police in Matabeleland, and Rhodes promised not to reintroduce it.

On its reconstitution in 1896, the BSAP was authorised to recruit 600 officers and men in Matabeleland—all of whom were white because of Rhodes's promise at the indaba—and 680 in Mashonaland, of whom 100 should be black. In practice, the "Native Contingent" in Mashonaland numbered 120. The BSAP thereafter operated alongside the Southern Rhodesian Constabulary (SRC), a town police force covering Salisbury, Bulawayo, Fort Victoria, Gwelo and Umtali. The constabulary was far smaller than the BSAP—in 1898 it included only 156 officers and men, black and white—and it was run by local magistrates, as opposed to the paramilitary BSAP, which had a military-style structure.

The commissioned ranks in the BSAP were entirely white, but the number of black constables in its ranks gradually rose, with many being recruited abroad. This kind of recruitment was not uncommon in colonial Africa, as many white officials of the day believed that blacks who policed their own communities were easily corruptible, and often not inclined to properly ensure the payment of colonial institutions such as hut tax. In Southern Rhodesia, many constables came from Barotseland, Zululand and Zanzibar. Locally sourced black policemen were officially reintroduced to Matabeleland in 1904; that year the force nominally contained 550 whites and 500 blacks. The SRC was merged into the BSAP in 1909, putting law enforcement in Southern Rhodesia into the hands of a single authority for the first time. Following the end of Company rule in 1923, the BSAP endured as Southern Rhodesia's police force. (Note: It did so, retaining its name, until 1980.)

=== Policing north of the Zambezi ===
North-Eastern Rhodesia was initially policed by locally recruited rank-and-filers, led by white officers from south of the river; the first force was raised in 1896. During its early years it busied itself eliminating the slave trade, in which foreign traders, mostly Arabs, captured villagers for sale as slaves overseas. A more regular police force was then introduced by the Company in each of the northern territories. Because there were so few white immigrants to North-Eastern Rhodesia—and because most of them were men of the church or of business rather than potential recruits—the North-Eastern Rhodesia Constabulary was almost exclusively black, including all of its non-commissioned officers.

North-Western Rhodesia attracted more white immigrants than its north-eastern counterpart, and its police force initially comprised an all-white detachment of Company police seconded from Southern Rhodesia. The unit proved expensive to maintain, however, and many of its constables fell victim to the unfamiliar tropical diseases of Barotseland. Local black constables were introduced in 1900 after the Company unsuccessfully attempted to recruit more whites. In 1902, the Barotse Native Police was formed, with Bemba, Ngoni and Ila recruits making up most of the ranks. Minor forces of white policemen were formed in the towns north of the Zambezi.

After North-Western and North-Eastern Rhodesia merged into Northern Rhodesia in 1911, the police forces were amalgamated as the Northern Rhodesia Police (NRP). Like the BSAP, the NRP was effectively a paramilitary rather than civil organisation, with its armed constables receiving martial training under military command. Because they were not trained in the civil manner considered normal in a more developed country, most of them were illiterate. The main purpose of the force during the early 1910s was not to police Northern Rhodesia's towns, but rather to prevent and combat potential uprisings. The constables were also considered suitable for use as soldiers in the bush. It was not a large force; just before the outbreak of the World War I in 1914, it had only 800 personnel.

=== Rhodesian military involvement abroad ===
==== Second Boer War (1899–1902) ====
The BSAP served in the Second Boer War of 1899–1902 in its paramilitary capacity, with the newly formed Rhodesia Regiment also taking part, drawing most of its men from the Southern Rhodesia Volunteers. Rhodesia contributed approximately 1,000 men in all, about 20% of the white male population at the time. Rhodesia contributed part of the British garrison at the Battle of the Elands River in August 1900, during which a 500-man force made up principally of Australians and Rhodesians held off attacks from a far larger Boer army under General Koos de la Rey, and repeatedly refused offers of safe passage in return for surrender. Captain "Sandy" Butters, the Rhodesian commanding officer, encouraged his men with shouts towards the Boers that "Rhodesians never surrender!" The Rhodesia Regiment was disbanded later that year, shortly after the relief of Mafeking.

==== World War I (1914–18) ====
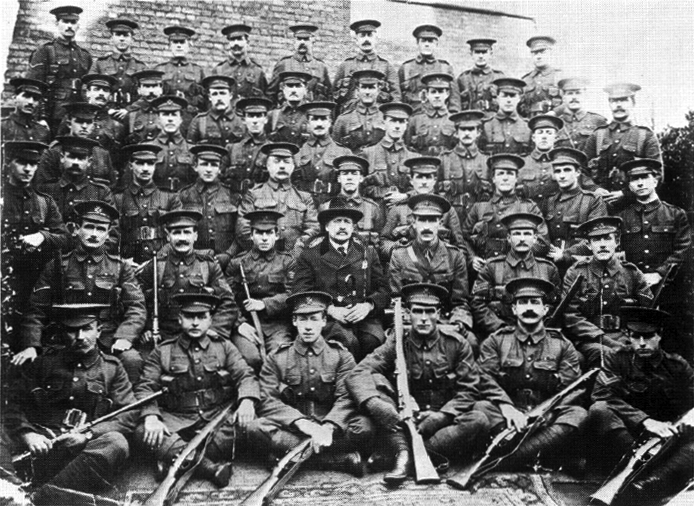
The original King's Royal Rifle Corps Rhodesian Platoon, pictured at Sheerness, England in November 1914. In the centre of the second row sit Captain J B Brady and the Marquess of Winchester.

With its fledgling White population largely characterised by youth, hardiness and Imperial patriotism, Southern Rhodesia proved a bountiful source of volunteers during the First World War, in which about 40% of Southern Rhodesian White males of service age fought. The majority of Southern Rhodesian personnel served with British, South African and other regiments on the Western Front (in Belgium and France). The Company raised exclusively Rhodesian units for African service.

Following the start of the war in August 1914, the Rhodesia Regiment was reformed in October, initially comprising 20 officers and 500 men, mostly Southern Rhodesians. This force, which became called the 1st Rhodesia Regiment, was sent to the Cape to fight alongside the South Africans in South-West Africa. The 2nd Rhodesia Regiment, raised a month later, was sent to the East African Front. Following the end of the South-West African Campaign in 1915, the 1st Rhodesia Regiment was dissolved; most of its men travelled to England to volunteer for the Western Front, while others joined the 2nd in East Africa. Boasting an effective strength of about 800 for the rest of its tour of duty, the 2nd Rhodesia Regiment returned home in April 1917, and disbanded in October.

Influenced by South Africa's reluctance to use Black soldiers in what was widely considered a "White man's war", Southern Rhodesia did not recruit Blacks in large numbers until 1916, when the number of potential White volunteers not already in uniform became too small to merit further drafts. The Rhodesia Native Regiment (RNR) was formed in that year to join the 2nd Rhodesia Regiment in East Africa, and included 2,507 men by 1918. Organisers expected that most Black volunteers would come from the Matabele people, famous for its martial tradition, and therefore originally named the unit the "Matabele Regiment"; however, when the ranks proved to be ethnically diverse, the name was changed. Led by White officers, the Black soldiers served with distinction in East Africa, soon becoming regarded as formidable bush fighters. Pitted against the German Generalmajor Paul von Lettow-Vorbeck—who was mounting a successful guerrilla campaign against the far larger Allied forces—they remained in East Africa for the rest of the war, returning home only in December 1918, soon after von Lettow-Vorbeck surrendered at Abercorn in Northern Rhodesia on 25 November. The RNR was thereupon dissolved.

== End of Company rule ==
=== 1922 Southern Rhodesian government referendum ===
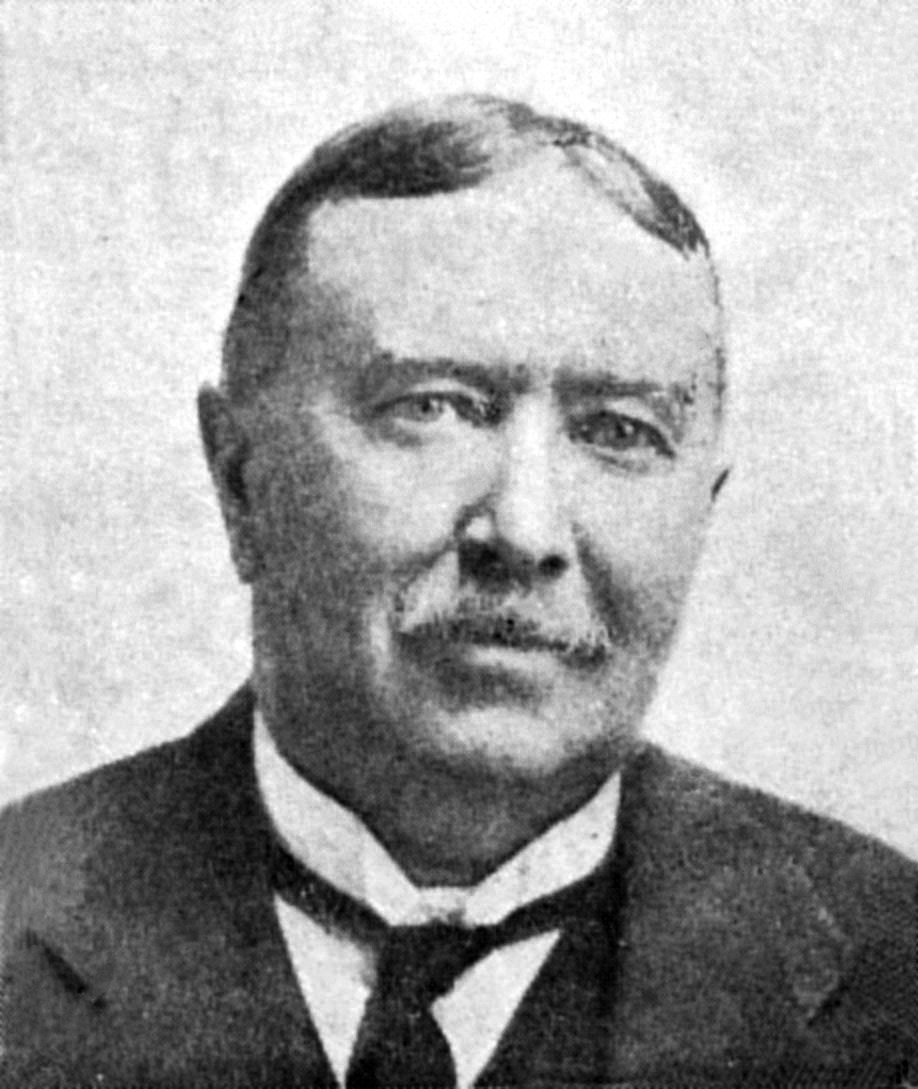
Sir Charles Coghlan led the Responsible Government Association's campaign for self-government.

In 1917, the Responsible Government Association (RGA) was formed. This party sought self-government for Southern Rhodesia within the Empire, just as Britain had previously granted "responsible government" to its colonies in Australia, Canada, New Zealand and South Africa as a precursor to full dominion status. Sir Charles Coghlan, a lawyer based in Bulawayo, led the RGA from 1919. The RGA opposed the proposed integration of Southern Rhodesia into the Union of South Africa, which had been formed in 1910 by the South Africa Act 1909, Section 150 of which explicitly provisioned for the accession of territories governed by the British South Africa Company. The Company originally stood against Southern Rhodesia's addition, fearing the territory might become dominated by Afrikaners, but abruptly changed its stance when, in 1918, the Privy Council in London ruled that unalienated land in the Rhodesias belonged to the British Crown rather than to the Company. This removed the longstanding stream of Company revenue created by the sale of land.

The loss of this source of income hampered the Company's ability to pay dividends to its shareholders, and caused its development of the Rhodesias to slow. The Company now backed Southern Rhodesia's incorporation into South Africa, hoping its membership in the union could help solve both problems. However, this prospect proved largely unpopular in Southern Rhodesia, where most of the settlers wanted self-government rather than rule from Pretoria, and came to vote for the RGA in large numbers. In the 1920 Legislative Council election, the RGA won ten of the 13 seats contested. A referendum on the colony's future was held on 27 October 1922—at the suggestion of Winston Churchill, then Britain's Colonial Secretary, continuing the initiative of his preprocessor Lord Milner—and responsible government won the day. Just under 60% of voters backed responsible government from a turnout of 18,810; Marandellas was the only district to favour the union option, doing so by 443 votes to 433.

=== Self-government vs. direct rule ===
Southern Rhodesia was duly annexed by the Empire on 12 September 1923, and granted full self-government on 1 October the same year. The new Southern Rhodesian government immediately purchased the land from the British Treasury for £2 million. The Company retained mineral rights in the country until 1933, when they were bought by the colonial government, also for £2 million.

The future administration of Northern Rhodesia, a proposition of little economic viability without its southern counterpart, was a burden the Company now endeavoured to rid itself of. Negotiations between the Company and the British government produced a settlement whereby the territory would become a protectorate under Whitehall, with government transferred to the Colonial Office in London, which would henceforth appoint a local governor. The Company would concurrently keep the country's mineral rights, extensive tracts of freehold property, and half the proceeds from future sales of land in what had been North-Western Rhodesia. Northern Rhodesia duly became an Imperial protectorate on 1 April 1924, with Sir Herbert Stanley installed as the inaugural governor. British South Africa Company rule in Rhodesia was thereby ended.

== Notes and references ==
=== Online sources ===
- "British South Africa Company (BSAC, BSACO, or BSA Company)". Encyclopædia Britannica Online. Chicago, Illinois: Encyclopædia Britannica, Inc.

=== Newspaper and journal articles ===
- Hunt, B. L. (1959). "Kalomo–Livingstone in 1907". The Northern Rhodesia Journal. IV (1). Lusaka: Northern Rhodesia Society: 9–17.
- Tawse-Jollie, Ethel (May–June 1936). "The Chartered Company in Rhodesia" (PDF). The British South Africa Company Historical Catalogue & Souvenir of Rhodesia. Empire Exhibition 1936. Johannesburg: Leader: 5–31.
- "1893 Sequence of Events; The Wilson (Shangani) Patrol" (PDF). Centenary of the Matabele War of 1893. Harare: Mashonaland Branch of the History Society of Zimbabwe. 25–26 September 1993. Archived from the original (PDF) on 30 January 2021.

=== Bibliography ===
- Berlyn, Phillippa (April 1978). The Quiet Man: A Biography of the Hon. Ian Douglas Smith. Salisbury: M. O. Collins.
- Binda, Alexandre (November 2007). Heppenstall, David (ed.). Masodja: The History of the Rhodesian African Rifles and its forerunner the Rhodesian Native Regiment. Johannesburg: 30° South Publishers. ISBN 978-1-920143-03-9.
- Blake, Robert (1977). A History of Rhodesia (First ed.). London: Eyre Methuen. ISBN 9780413283504.
- Boahen, A. Adu, ed. (1992) [1990]. General History of Africa. VII: Africa under Colonial Domination 1880–1935 (Second ed.). Nairobi, Kampala and Dar es Salaam: East African Educational Publishers. ISBN 9966-46-747-5.
- Brelsford, W. V., ed. (1960). Handbook to the Federation of Rhodesia and Nyasaland. London: Cassell.
- Cox, Reginald H. W. (1982). Military badges of the British Empire 1914–18. London: Ernest Benn. ISBN 9780510000820.
- Davidson, Apollon (1988) [1984]. Cecil Rhodes and His Time (First English ed.). Moscow: Progress Publishers. ISBN 5-01-001828-4.
- Davitt, Michael (1902). The Boer Fight For Freedom (First ed.). New York & London: Funk & Wagnalls. OCLC 457453010.
- Duignan, Peter; Gann, L. H., eds. (1975). Colonialism in Africa 1870–1960. Volume Four: The Economics of Colonialism (First ed.). Cambridge: Cambridge University Press. ISBN 978-0521086417.
- Farwell, Byron (September 2001). The Encyclopedia of Nineteenth-Century Land Warfare: An Illustrated World View. New York: W. W. Norton & Company. ISBN 978-0393047707.
- Ferguson, Niall (April 2004). Empire: the rise and demise of the British world order and the lessons for global power. New York: Basic Books. ISBN 978-0-465-02329-5.
- Galbraith, John S. (1974). Crown and Charter: The Early Years of the British South Africa Company. Berkeley, California: University of California Press. ISBN 0-520-02693-4.
- Gann, Lewis H. (1958). The Birth of a Plural Society: The Development of Northern Rhodesia Under the British South Africa Company, 1894-1914. Manchester University Press.
- Gann, Lewis H. (1969) [1964]. A History of Northern Rhodesia: Early Days to 1953. New York: Humanities Press. OCLC 46853.
- Gibbs, Peter; Phillips, Hugh; Russell, Nick (2009). Blue and Old Gold: The History of the British South Africa Police, 1889–1980. Johannesburg: 30° South Publishers. ISBN 978-1920143350.
- Groenewald, P. S. (2007). Rabadia Ratšhatšha: Studies in African Language Literature, Linguistics, Translation and Lexicography. Stellenbosch: Sun Media, Stellenbosch University. ISBN 9781920109721.
- Hopkins, Donald R. (September 2002) [1983]. The Greatest Killer: Smallpox in History. Chicago, Illinois: University of Chicago Press. ISBN 978-0226351681.
- Keppel-Jones, Arthur (1983). Rhodes and Rhodesia: The White Conquest of Zimbabwe, 1884–1902. Montreal, Quebec and Kingston, Ontario: McGill-Queen's University Press. ISBN 978-0-7735-0534-6.
- Marston, Roger (January 2010). Own Goals – National pride and defeat in war: the Rhodesian experience. Northampton: Paragon Publishing. ISBN 978-1-899820-81-8.
- McLaughlin, Peter (1980). Ragtime Soldiers: the Rhodesian Experience in the First World War. Bulawayo: Books of Zimbabwe. ISBN 0-86920-232-4.
- Moloney, Joseph A. (2007) [1893]. Saffery, David (ed.). With Captain Stairs to Katanga: Slavery and Subjugation in the Congo 1891–92. London: Jeppestown Press. ISBN 978-0955393655.
- Okoth, Assa (2006). A History of Africa, Volume One: African societies and the establishment of colonial rule, 1800–1915 (First ed.). Nairobi, Kampala and Dar es Salaam: East African Educational Publishers. ISBN 9789966253576.
- Parsons, Neil (1993). A New History of Southern Africa (Second ed.). London: Macmillan Publishers. ISBN 978-0841953192.
- Ranger, Terence O. (September 2010). Bulawayo Burning: The Social History of a Southern African City, 1893–1960. Oxford: James Currey. ISBN 978-1-84701-020-9.
- Rotberg, Robert I. (October 1988). The Founder: Cecil Rhodes and the Pursuit of Power (First ed.). Oxford: Oxford University Press. ISBN 978-0195049688.
- Rowe, David M. (2001). Manipulating the Market: Understanding Economic Sanctions, Institutional Change, and the Political Unity of White Rhodesia (First ed.). Ann Arbor, Michigan: University of Michigan Press. ISBN 978-0472111879.
- Stapleton, Timothy (2006). No Insignificant Part: The Rhodesia Native Regiment and the East Africa Campaign of the First World War. Waterloo, Ontario: Wilfrid Laurier University Press. ISBN 9780889204980.
- Stapleton, Timothy (2011). African Police and Soldiers in Colonial Zimbabwe, 1923–80. Rochester, New York: University of Rochester Press. ISBN 978-1-58046-380-5.
- Strachan, Hew (February 2003). The First World War, Volume I: To Arms. Oxford: Oxford University Press. ISBN 9780191608346.
- Walker, Eric A., ed. (1963). The Cambridge History of the British Empire, Volume Four (Second ed.). Cambridge: Cambridge University Press. OCLC 560778129.
- Weinthal, Leo (1923). The Story of the Cape to Cairo Railway & River Route from 1887 to 1922. Chicago: The Pioneer Publishing Company. OCLC 2696536.
- Wessels, Hannes (July 2010). P. K. van der Byl: African Statesman. Johannesburg: 30° South Publishers. ISBN 978-1-920143-49-7.
- Wills, A. J. (1967). An Introduction to the History of Central Africa (Second ed.). Oxford: Oxford University Press.
- Willson, F. M. G., ed. (1963). Source Book of Parliamentary Elections and Referenda in Southern Rhodesia, 1898–1962. Salisbury: Department of Government, University College of Rhodesia and Nyasaland.
- Wood, J. R. T. (June 2005). So far and no further! Rhodesia's bid for independence during the retreat from empire 1959–1965. Victoria, British Columbia: Trafford Publishing. ISBN 978-1-4120-4952-8.
- Youé, Christopher P. (1986). Robert Thorne Coryndon: Proconsular Imperialism in Southern and Eastern Africa, 1897–1925 (First ed.). Waterloo, Ontario: Wilfrid Laurier University Press. ISBN 978-0889201989.
