= Pioneer Column =

Military force of the British South Africa Company

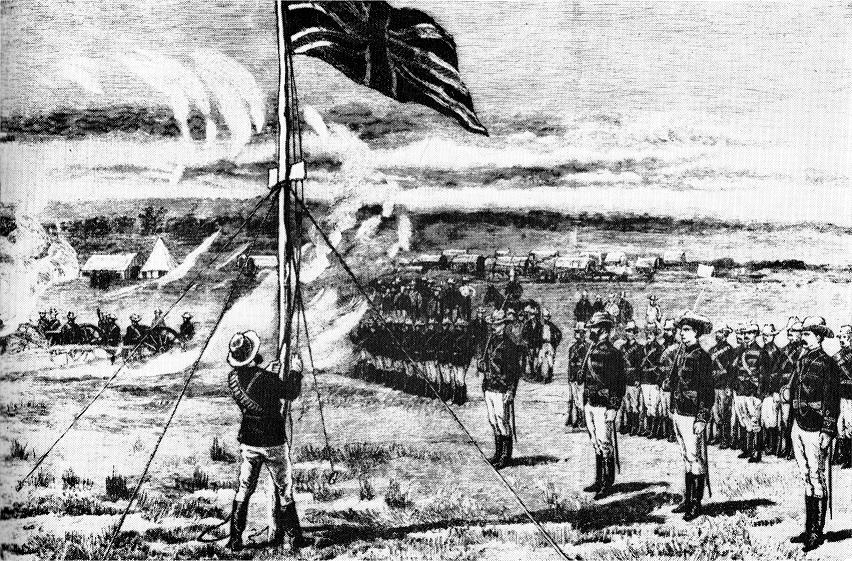
Lieutenant Edward Tyndale-Biscoe hoists the Union Jack on the kopje overlooking Fort Salisbury on the morning of 13 September 1890. The day of the column's arrival, 12 September, was a national holiday between 1920 and 1979.

The Pioneer Column was a force raised by Cecil Rhodes and his British South Africa Company in 1890 and used in his efforts to annex the territory of Mashonaland, later part of Zimbabwe (once Southern Rhodesia).

== Background ==
Rhodes was anxious to secure Matabeleland and Mashonaland before the Germans, Portuguese or Boers did. His first step was to persuade the Ndebele King Lobengula, in 1888, to sign a treaty giving him rights to mining and administration (but not settlement as such) in the area of Mashonaland which was not under direct Ndebele rule. Using this Rudd Concession (so called because Rhodes's business partner, Charles Rudd, was instrumental in securing the signature) between Rhodes' British South Africa Company (allegedly on behalf of Queen Victoria though without any official knowledge or authority) and Lobengula, he then sought and obtained a charter from the British government allowing him to act, essentially although in a limited way, with the government's consent. The next step was to occupy the territory.

== Column assembly ==
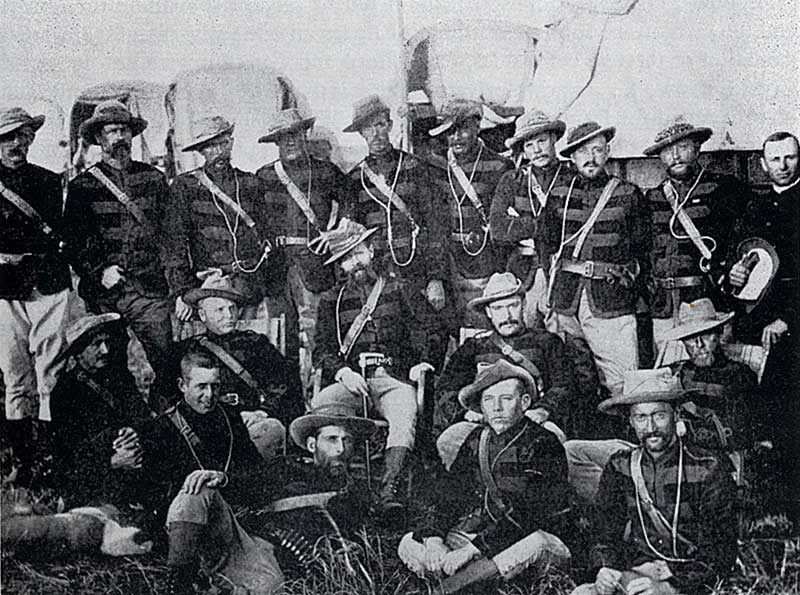
Officers of the Pioneer Corps, c. 1890

Rhodes's military advisers estimated that it would take 2,500 men and about one million pounds to win the war that would, they thought, inevitably result when Lobengula realised that Rhodes meant not only to mine but also to occupy his land. Frank Johnson, a 23-year-old adventurer, however, undertook to deliver the territory in nine months with a mere 250 men for £87,500. Frederick Selous, a hunter with close knowledge of Mashonaland, agreed to join the effort as guide. Johnson published recruitment notices in Kimberley offering each volunteer 1,200 hectares (3,000 acres) of land and 15 mining claims (aggregating about 8.5 hectares (21 acres)). On the advice of Rhodes, Johnson selected for his column, from thousands of applicants, mostly the sons of rich families, so that if they were, indeed, imperiled by Lobengula their families would be more likely to enlist British government support for their rescue. Johnson's column eventually consisted of 180 civilian colonists, 62 wagons and 200 volunteers (who ultimately formed the nucleus of what became the British South Africa Police). A further party of 110 men, 16 wagons, 250 cattle and 130 spare horses later attached itself to the column. The troopers were equipped with Martini-Henry rifles, revolvers, seven-pound field guns and Maxim machine guns, as well as an electric searchlight (which they later used to good effect to intimidate Matabele warriors shadowing the column).

== Expedition ==
The route began at Macloutsie in Bechuanaland on 28 June 1890. On 11 July, it crossed the river Tuli into Matabeleland. It proceeded north-east and then north over a distance of about 650 kilometres (400 mi) intending to terminate at an open area explored by Selous a few years earlier that he called Mount Hampden. However, the column halted about 15 kilometres (9.3 mi) before that at a naturally flat and marshy meadow bounded by a steep rocky hill; (today's Harare Kopje) on 12 September (later celebrated as a Rhodesian public holiday called Pioneer's day). The British union flag was hoisted on the following day, 13 September, in Fort Salisbury.

Three towns were founded; the first in early August at the head of a gentle route that led up from the low altitude area known as the Lowveld (named Providential Pass), called Fort Victoria (renamed Masvingo in 1982); the second at Fort Charter on a plateau halfway to the terminus of the column at the originally named Fort Salisbury.

The Pioneer Corps was officially disbanded on 1 October 1890 and each member was granted land on which to farm.

== Aftermath ==
The occupation of Mashonaland by the Pioneer Column lead to the start of Company rule in Rhodesia. The BSAC would expand its rule across the Zambezi in 1891, and over Matabeleland through the First Matabele War in 1893-1894.

== Campaign medal ==
In 1927, the government of Southern Rhodesia issued a new British South Africa Company Medal to commemorate the earlier 1890 Pioneer Column. This medal was identical to the prior British South Africa Company Medals issued for the First Matabele War and Second Matabele War, except that it was struck without any campaign details on the reverse.

== See also ==
- Nehanda Nyakasikana
- Shangani Patrol
