= Scouting and Guiding in Namibia =

Scouting and Guiding associations in Namibia

The Scout and Guide movement in Namibia is served by:

- The Girl Guides Association of Namibia, member of the World Association of Girl Guides and Girl Scouts
- Scouts of Namibia, member of the World Organization of the Scout Movement
- Deutscher Pfadfinderbund in Namibia (German Scout Association of Namibia, a small association open mainly to boys and girls of German descent)
