= Geach =

Geach is a surname. Notable people with the surname include:

- Carveth Geach (1928–2005), Chief Scout of the Boy Scouts of South Africa
- David Geach (1923–2015), RAF bomb aimer
- Peter Geach (1916–2013), British philosopher and professor
- Portia Geach (1973–1959), Australian artist and feminist
- Trevor Geach (1928–1996), South African cricketer
