= Zelotes muizenbergensis =

Scientific classification
- Kingdom: Animalia
- Phylum: Arthropoda
- Subphylum: Chelicerata
- Class: Arachnida
- Order: Araneae
- Infraorder: Araneomorphae
- Family: Gnaphosidae
- Genus: Zelotes
- Species: Z. muizenbergensis

Binomial name
- Zelotes muizenbergensis FitzPatrick, 2007

Species of spider

Zelotes muizenbergensis is a species of spider in the family Gnaphosidae. It is endemic to South Africa.

== Distribution ==
Zelotes muizenbergensis is known only from the type locality at Muizenberg in the Western Cape, South Africa. The species occurs at an altitude of 8 m above sea level.

== Habitat and ecology ==
Flat-bellied ground spiders are nocturnal hunters that make silk sacs under stones and surface debris where they live during the day, while moulting and during prolonged periods of inactivity. The species has been sampled from the Fynbos biome.

== Conservation ==
Zelotes muizenbergensis is listed as Data Deficient for taxonomic reasons. The species is based on only one male that was sampled in 1991. The female is still undescribed and more sampling is needed to determine the species range. The species is threatened by loss of habitat for infrastructure development.

== Taxonomy ==
Zelotes muizenbergensis was described by FitzPatrick in 2007 from Muizenberg in the Western Cape. The species is known only from the male.
