= Carveth =

Carveth may refer to:

- Carveth Read — was a 19th and 20th century British philosopher and logician. He was born 16 March 1848 in Falmouth, Cornwall, England.
- Carveth Thompson — is an American former politician in the state of South Dakota.
- Carveth Geach — served as the Chief Scout of the Boy Scouts of South Africa.
- Joe Carveth (1918-1985), Canadian ice hockey player.
