= Herbert Stanley =

British diplomat

Sir Herbert Stanley GCMG KStJ
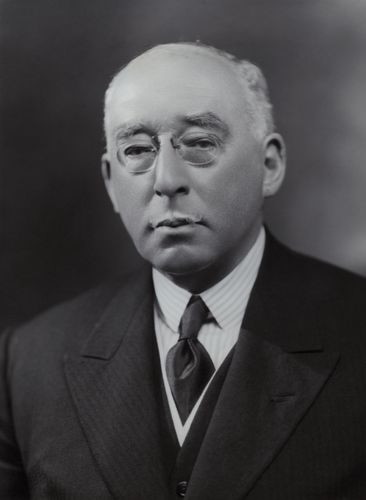

25th Governor of British Ceylon
- In office 20 August 1928 – 11 February 1931
- Monarch: George V
- Preceded by: Arthur George Murchison Fletcher (Acting governor)
- Succeeded by: Bernard Henry Bourdillon (Acting governor)

Personal details
- Born: 25 July 1872 England
- Died: 5 June 1955 (aged 82) Cape Town
- Spouse(s): Reniera van Oosterzee Cloete (m. 1918-1950; her death); later Dame Reniera Stanley
- Children: 4

Sir Herbert James Stanley, GCMG KStJ (25 July 1872 – 5 June 1955) was a leading British colonial administrator, who served at different times as Governor of Northern Rhodesia, Ceylon and Southern Rhodesia.

== Life and career ==
Born in England, Stanley was educated at Eton College and Balliol College, Oxford, and worked in the foreign service in Dresden and Coburg before serving as the Resident Commissioner for Southern and Northern Rhodesia from 1911 to 1914.

Stanley proved controversial in this role when he refused to allow settlers to take land from Africans, instead assigning 21,500,000 acres (87,000 km^{2}) in perpetuity exclusively for the use of Africans.

Based in South Africa during World War I, Stanley married Reniera van Oosterzee Cloete, from a leading Cape Town family, in 1918. She was described as "one of the most beautiful women of the century in any country of the world". She was created a Dame Commander of the Order of the British Empire in 1941, and predeceased her husband in 1950.

In 1918, Stanley was appointed imperial secretary in South Africa, a position he held until 1924, when he was appointed the inaugural governor of Northern Rhodesia. Taking office on 1 April 1924 as governor of Northern Rhodesia, Stanley sought an amalgamation of the central African colonies and an extension of the Northern Rhodesian Railway into Southern Rhodesia. He was also active in establishing and promoting Boy Scouts and Girl Guides. He was appointed a Knight Commander of the Order of St Michael and St George (KCMG) in the 1924 Birthday Honours.

In 1927, Stanley was transferred to Ceylon as its governor, which drew criticism due to his lack of background knowledge of Asian affairs, although he is reported to have acquitted himself well. Whilst in Ceylon he served as president of the Ceylon Branch of the Royal Asiatic Society in 1929–30. In 1932, he was made Knight of Grace of the Venerable Order of Saint John

He returned to Africa in 1931 to serve as High Commissioner for the United Kingdom in South Africa before his appointment as Governor of Southern Rhodesia in 1935, initially for a two-year term, but he was persuaded to remain in Salisbury until 1942, when he retired from active service.

During his tenure as Governor of Southern Rhodesia, Stanley served across three reigns, those of George V, Edward VIII, and George VI. His governorship coincided with significant labour disputes across the region; in January 1938 he received a formal protest from Sir Harold Kittermaster, Governor of Nyasaland, over the conditions and wages offered to Nyasa workers in Southern Rhodesia, which Kittermaster considered inferior to those available on the Rand.

Upon his retirement, Stanley settled in Cape Town and was appointed chief commissioner of the Boy Scouts of South Africa. He died a widower in a Cape Town nursing home, aged 82, survived by two sons and two daughters.

Government offices
Preceded by inaugural	Governor of Northern Rhodesia; 1924–1927	Succeeded by Sir James Maxwell
Preceded by Arthur George Murchison Fletcher acting governor	Governor of Ceylon; 1928–1931	Succeeded by Bernard Henry Bourdillon acting governor
Preceded by Fraser Russell	Governor of Southern Rhodesia; 1935–1942	Succeeded by Fraser Russell
World Organization of the Scout Movement
Preceded by Gideon Brand van Zyl	Chief Commissioner, Boy Scouts of South Africa; 1951–1953	Succeeded by E Percy Fowle
