= Kon-Tiki (Scouting) =

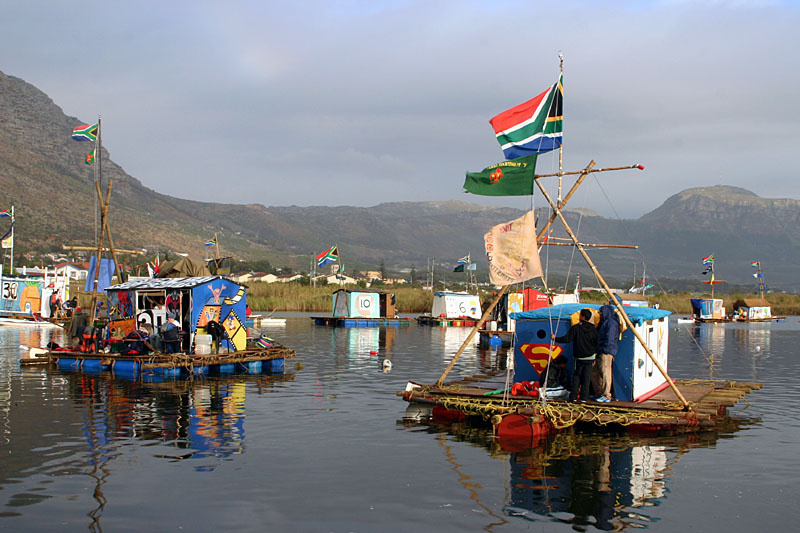
Rafts on Sandvlei during the Kon-Tiki Adventure for Scouts and Guides at Lakeside, Cape Town in 2006

Kon-Tiki refers to Scout and Guide raft building competitions held by Scouts South Africa and Scouts Australia. Named after Thor Heyerdahl's Kon-Tiki expedition of 1947, teams of Scouts and Guides age 11 to 17 compete to build and live on a raft for a weekend. Support crews compete in other events while the raft is afloat.

== South African events ==
The Cape Town competition is held at the Sea Scout Base on the banks of Zandvlei, and was first held in the early 1980s. The event starts on the Friday afternoon with teams arriving and starting construction of the raft. The building criteria are very strict and judging takes place continuously until the raft launch on the Saturday at 2 pm. Much of the judging is related to safety.

The Gauteng competition is held at Arrowe Park in Benoni, Gauteng (previous events held at Murray Park, Springs). The first event was held in 1985 at Murray Park.

The competition is run in a very similar fashion to the Cape Town one, with the exception that the rafts launch at 11h00 on the Saturday morning. There are also numerous other activities and competitions for the support crew to partake in, such as the Beaver Challenge, Spare Time Activities, Dress-up competition and others. The 2015 theme was "Here be Dragons".

Kon-Tiki events have also been held in Port Elizabeth in the Eastern Cape.

== Australian event ==
In 2012, Scouts Australia (SA Branch) ran the first Kon-tiki Raft Challenge outside South Africa. The competition was based on that of the South Africans.

== See also ==
- Scouts South Africa
- Girl Guides Association of South Africa
- Scouts Australia
