= Winston Adams =

South African Scout leader

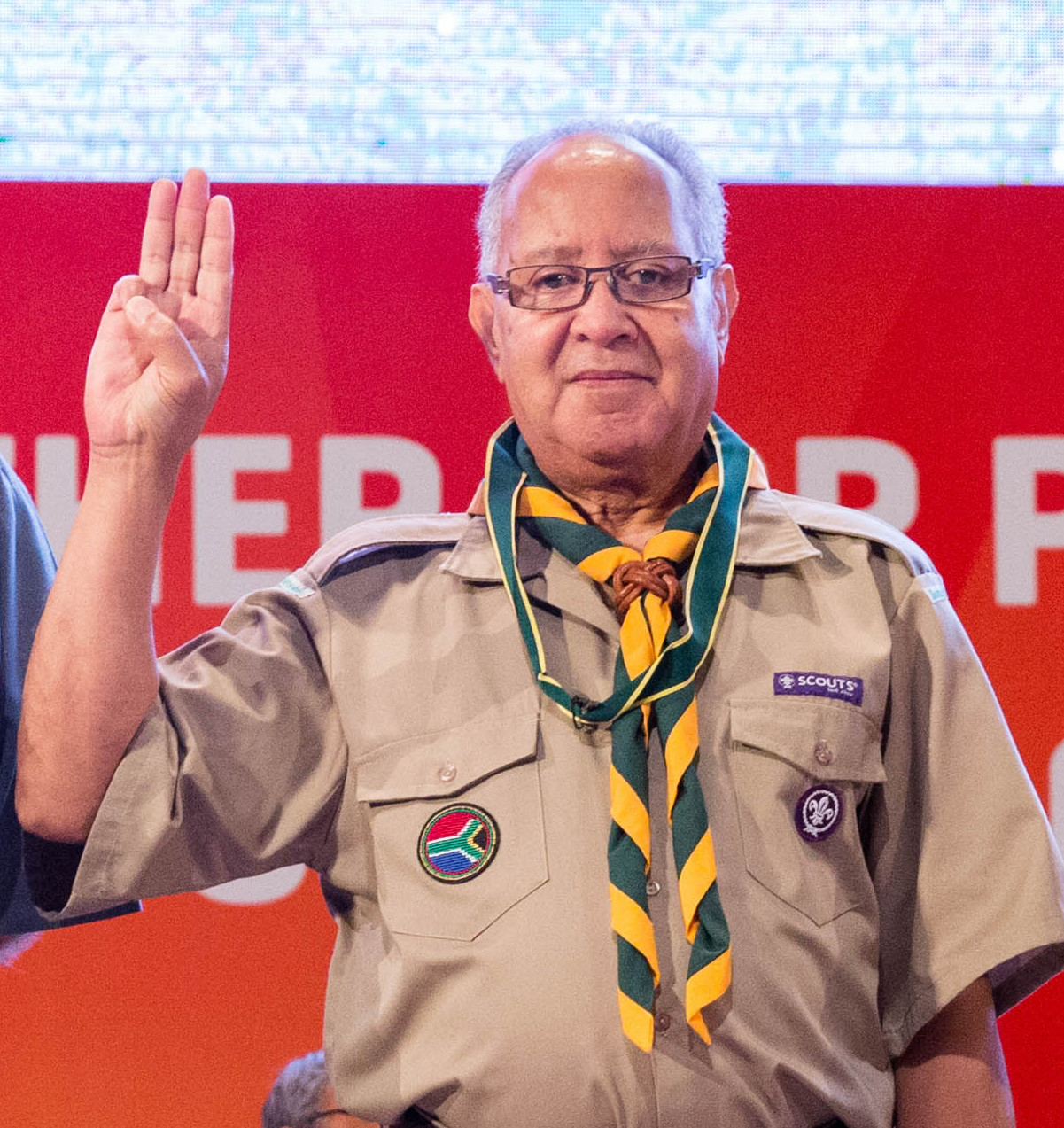
- Winston Adams

Regional Director of the African Scout Region
- In office 2008-2009

Director of the World Organization of the Scout Movement
- In office 1999

Personal details
- Born: 1940 (age 84–85)
- Occupation: Scout leader
- Awards: Bronze Wolf (2017)

Winston Adams (born 1940) is a South African Scout leader who has held regional and international leadership positions in the World Scout Bureau's Africa Scout Region.

== Scouting career ==
Adams joined 5th Cape Town Cub Pack in District Six in Cape Town when he was 9 years old in 1949. He was a professional Scout for 42 years, initially with Scouts South Africa, where he served as Area Secretary for the Cape Western Area. In 1990 the World Organization of the Scout Movement (WOSM) assigned him to Namibia for 6 months to set up the Scouts of Namibia national Scout office.

Adams was Director of the World Scout Conference in 1999 in Durban, South Africa. In 2003 he served on advisory boards and helped with the organisation of the 20th World Scout Jamboree in Thailand.

Between 2008 and 2009 he served as the regional director of the African Scout Region and since 2015 he has served on the Africa Scout Committee. He is the Chairperson for the Honours and Awards Sub Committee for the Africa Region and a member of the Africa Scout Foundation.

== Awards ==
In 1998, Adams was awarded the Order of the African Elephant by the African Scout Region.

In 2008, he was awarded the Silver Fox award by Scouts Canada. The Silver Fox is awarded for service of the most exceptional character to Scouting in the international field.

In 2017, he was awarded the 359th Bronze Wolf, the only distinction of the WOSM, awarded by the World Scout Committee for exceptional services to world Scouting.
