= E Percy Fowle =

Chief scout I the boy scout of South Africa

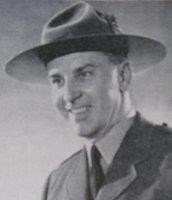

Chief Scout of the Boy Scouts of South Africa
- In office 1953–1958

E Percy Fowle served as the Chief Scout of the Boy Scouts of South Africa from 1953 to 1958. In 1954, he was promoted to Commander (Brother) of the Order of Saint John. In 1958, he led the South African contingent to the 9th World Scout Jamboree in England, held to celebrate the 50th anniversary of Scouting.

World Organization of the Scout Movement
Preceded by Sir Herbert Stanley	Chief Scout, Boy Scouts of South Africa; 1953–1958	Succeeded by Arthur H. Johnstone
