= Marina da Gama =

- Suburb
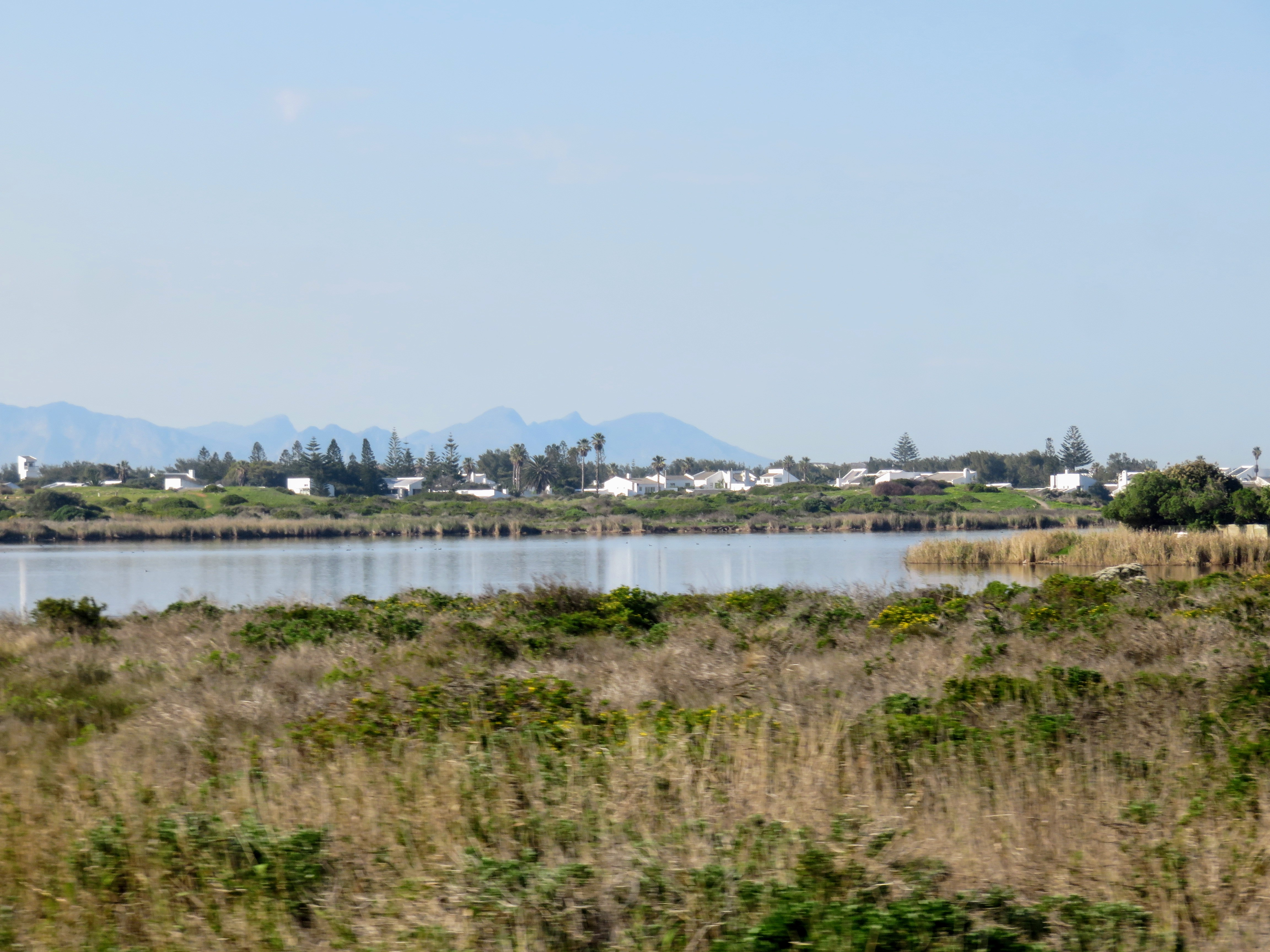
- View of Marina da Gama from the Zandvlei Estuary Nature Reserve
- Interactive map of Marina da Gama
- Coordinates: 34°5′17″S 18°28′9″E
- Country: South Africa
- Province: Western Cape
- Municipality: City of Cape Town

Government
  - Councillor: Izabel Sherry (Ward 64) (Democratic Alliance)

Area
  - Total: 2.96 km^{2} (1.14 sq mi)

Population (2011)
  - Total: 4,969
  - Density: 1,680/km^{2} (4,350/sq mi)

Racial makeup (2011)
  - Black African: 7.1%
  - Coloured: 17.0%
  - Indian/Asian: 1.3%
  - White: 68.4%
  - Other: 6.1%

First languages (2011)
  - English: 83.8%
  - Afrikaans: 11.2%
  - isiXhosa: 0.8%
  - Setswana: 0.5%
  - Other: 3.7%
- Time zone: UTC+2 (SAST)
- Postal code (street): 7945
- Area code: 021

Marina da Gama is a residential suburb part of the Greater Muizenberg area which is located in the Southern Suburbs of Cape Town, Western Cape, South Africa. The suburb was established in 1972 and named after Portuguese navigator Vasco da Gama. The suburb is adjacent to the Zandvlei Estuary Nature Reserve.

According to the 2011 census, the suburb had a population of 4,969, of whom 68.4% identified as "White", 17% as "Coloured", 7.1% as "Black African", 1.3% as "Indian" or "Asian" with 6.1% identifying with other ethnicities.
