= Lakeside, Cape Town =

Lakeside
- Suburb
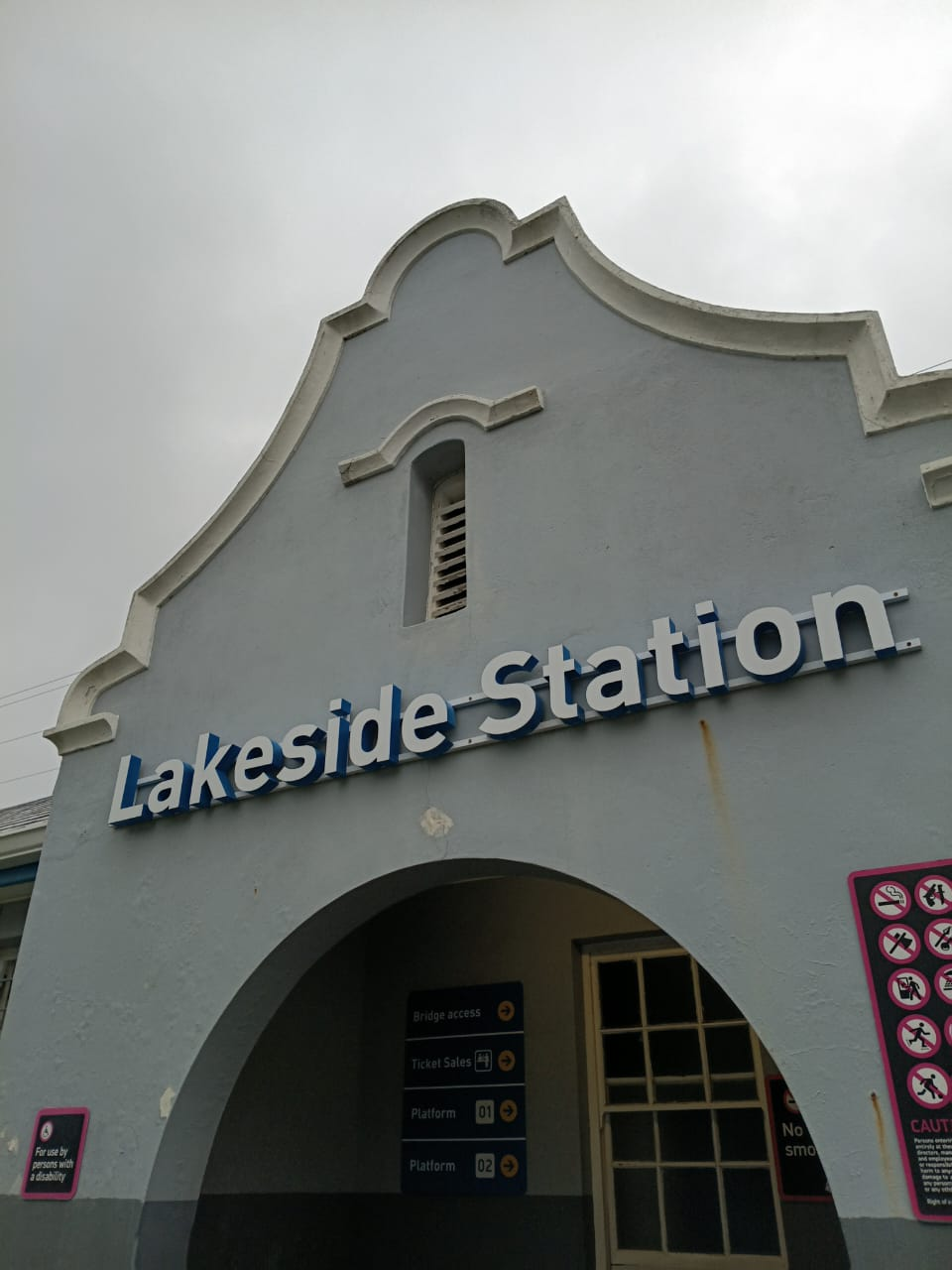
- The Lakeside station on the Southern Line runs through the suburb
- Interactive map of Lakeside
- Coordinates: 34°5′17.6″S 18°27′4.8″E
- Country: South Africa
- Province: Western Cape
- Municipality: City of Cape Town

Government
  - Councillor: Izabel Sherry (Ward 64) (Democratic Alliance)

Area
  - Total: 1.07 km^{2} (0.41 sq mi)

Population (2011)
  - Total: 2,226
  - Density: 2,080/km^{2} (5,390/sq mi)

Racial makeup (2011)
  - Black African: 5.9%
  - Coloured: 7.6%
  - Indian/Asian: 1.4%
  - White: 83.5%
  - Other: 1.6%

First languages (2011)
  - English: 86.8%
  - Afrikaans: 10.7%
  - isiNdebele: 0.3%
  - isiXhosa: 0.3%
  - Other: 1.9%
- Time zone: UTC+2 (SAST)
- Postal code (street): 7945
- Area code: 021

Lakeside is a residential suburb of Cape Town, South Africa, located in the city's Southern Suburbs. It is situated about 22 kilometres south of the Cape Town CBD. The suburb is located to the south of Westlake and to the north of Muizenberg. Its name is derived from its close proximity to the Sandvlei wetland, which is a part of the Zandvlei Estuary Nature Reserve.

The Lakeside Centre, a small retail centre, is located within the suburb.
