= Victor J. Clapham =

South African graphic artist

Victor J. Clapham (died 1991) was a South African graphic artist, awarded the Bronze Wolf, the only distinction of the World Organization of the Scout Movement, awarded by the World Scout Committee for exceptional services to world Scouting, in 1976.

His father, also called Vic Clapham, established the Comrades Marathon in South Africa.

== Career ==
Clapham joined the army when the Second World War began, and at one time worked as 'propagandist' (as Public Relations was then called) for the South African army. During the war, he was involved in founding the Springbok Legion, a politically liberal organisation for soldiers and veterans. Its programme undertook to secure a fair deal for soldiers, ex-servicemen and their dependents, to preserve unity between the races, and to defend democratic ideals, and it became an influential anti-apartheid group during the 1940s.

After the war he worked as 'propagandist' for the United Party. He also worked at one time as cartoonist for The Guardian.

He worked at Lindsay Smithers (now FCB), and rose to creative director of what was to become one of South Africa's largest advertising agencies.

== Scouting ==
Clapham's crisp black and white illustrations appeared in South African and international Scout publications for more than a generation. He established the Veld Lore newspaper at his Rover Crew in Natal (now KwaZulu-Natal) in about 1947. It soon became the publication for the whole province and then the national newspaper for Scouts, and he continued publishing it until his death in around 1991.

He pioneered the Join-In Jamboree concept, for Scouts in their home countries during World Scout Jamborees. In 1971 the idea of a "Join-in-Jamboree" developed by Clapham was promoted and accepted internationally during the 14th World Scout Jamboree. The concept earned the highest award from the Public Relations Society of America in 1976.
