= Union of German Scouts in South West Africa =

Scouting organization, founded in 1928

German-speaking Scouts in Namibia
- Flag of the Scouts in South-West Africa before 1939

The Union of German Scouts in South West Africa, (Bund deutscher Pfadfinder Südwestafrikas ) the first German oriented Scouting organization, was founded in 1928 in South West Africa and dissolved by the South African administration in 1939 on the outbreak of World War II. The current association, Deutscher Pfadfinderbund in Namibia, was founded in the 1960s, under the name Deutscher Pfadfinderbund Südwestafrika.

== Background ==
At the end of the World War I there was a sizable population of German Namibians in what is now Namibia. Most of these were farmers, craftsmen, and their families. By 1928, there was a movement to bring Scouting to the youth of South West Africa. The program flourished until it was made to become part of the "Hitler Youth" in 1934. In 1939, the group was disbanded at the start of World War II.

In 1937, Heinz Anton Klein-Werner wrote the song Südwesterlied for the German Scouts which later became the unofficial national anthem of the German Namibians.

== See also ==
- Deutscher Pfadfinderbund in Namibia
