= Zandvlei Estuary Nature Reserve =

Nature reserve and recreational area in Muizenberg, South Africa

- Location within Cape Town
- Location: Muizenberg, Western Cape, South Africa
- Coordinates: 34.0822°S 18.4669°E
- Area: 200 ha (490 acres)

Zandvlei Estuary Nature Reserve (also spelt "Sandvlei") is a 300-hectare (740-acre) nature reserve and recreational area located in Muizenberg near Cape Town, South Africa.

== Background ==
Entering the ocean in the coastal town of Muizenberg, Zandvlei is the only functioning estuary on Cape Town's False Bay coast, open to the Atlantic Ocean throughout winter and in summer the mouth is manually closed by a sand bar to contain the water, and is opened monthly for a few days at full moon to maintain salinity levels and then closed again. It is also one of the most important estuaries for recruitment of fish such as garrick, steenbras and two species of stumpnose.

The surrounding wetland is an important habitat for birds and has 166 species on its official list. There are a number of bird hides available to the public. It is also a vital habitat for amphibians and about 20 species of reptile such as the angulate tortoise, marsh terrapin and mole snake. Porcupines, grysbok, otters and mongoose can also occasionally be spotted.

The plant life is typical of Cape Flats Dune Strandveld and Cape Wetland vegetation. Rare or interesting plants include Gladiolus angustus and Salvia aurea (syn. S. africana-lutea).

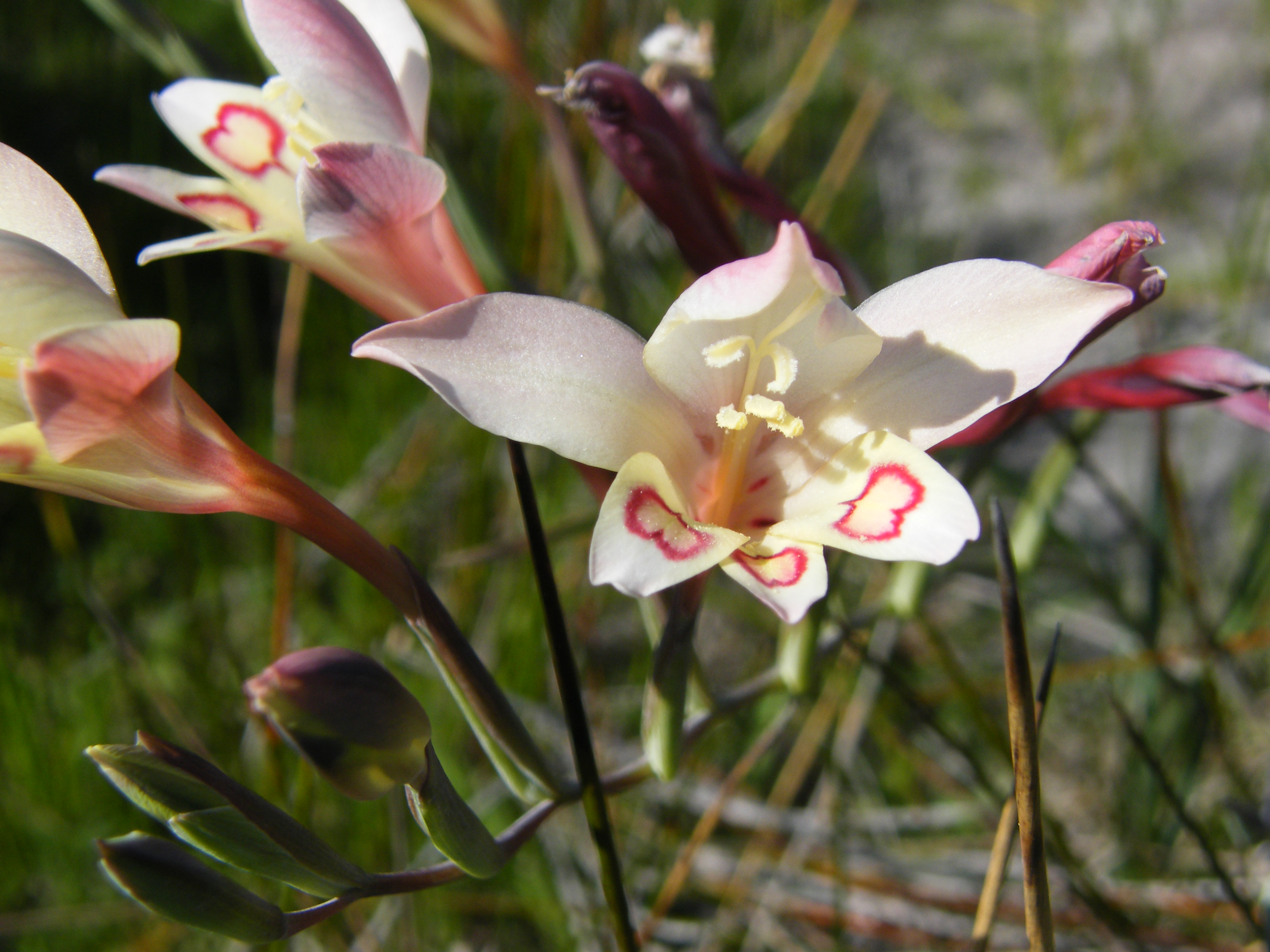
One of the beautiful Gladiolus angustus plants that can be seen blooming at the estuary Blooms in spring to early summer, from October to November.

The estuary was neglected in the past, and suffered from farming, urban development, dredging and the introduction of alien invasive species. The original vegetation has been partly restored through local government and volunteer efforts. There is now an Environmental Education Centre and the reserve is home to the Imperial Yacht Club and Peninsula Canoe Club. SCOUTS South Africa operate their Sea Scout base from there, conducting sailing and rowing regattas there, in addition to various training courses and the annual Kon-Tiki raft building competition. Fishing is popular, with many large garrick having been landed. A standard fishing permit is required.

== Gallery ==
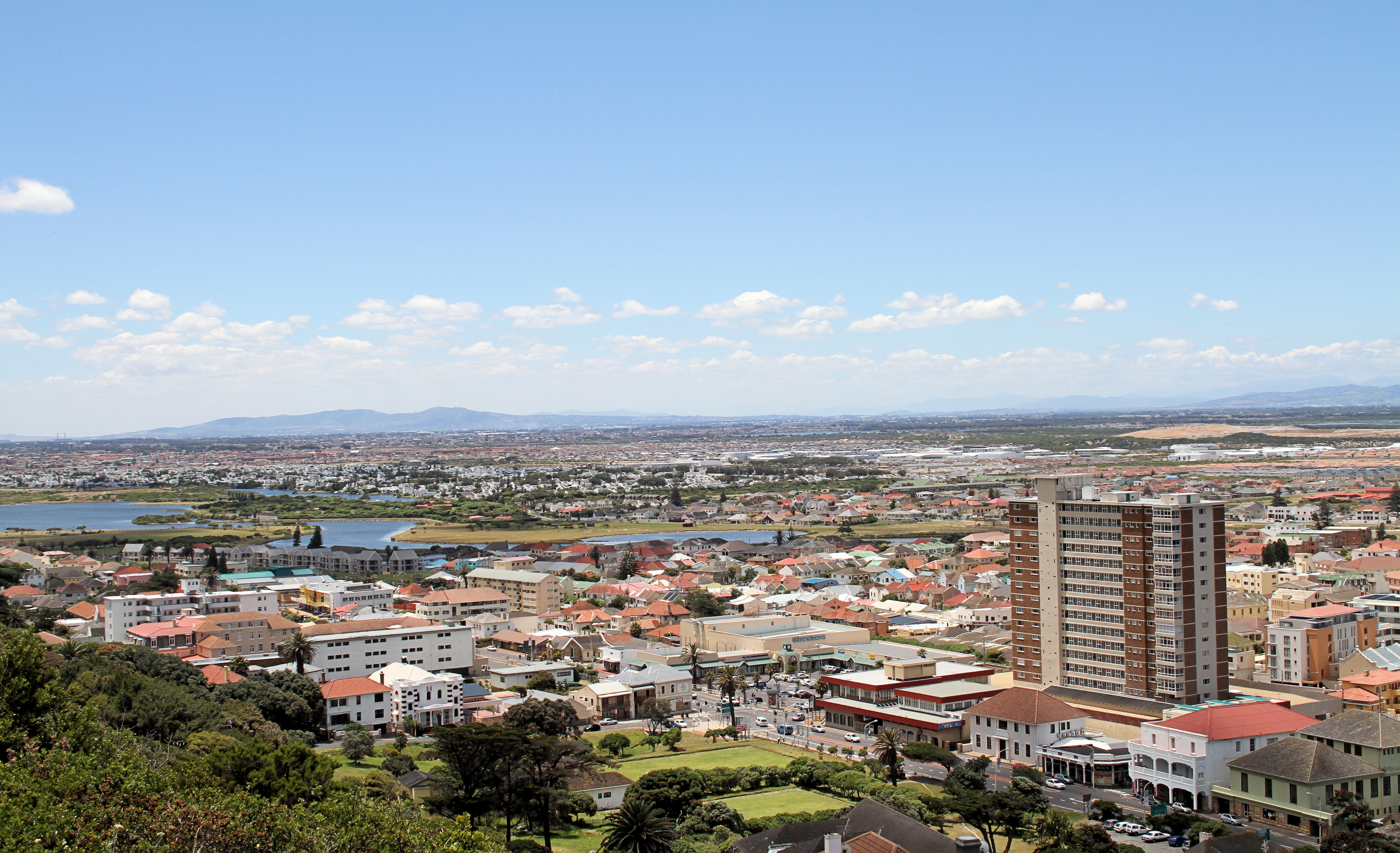
View of Muizenberg suburbs with Zandvlei estuary in the background

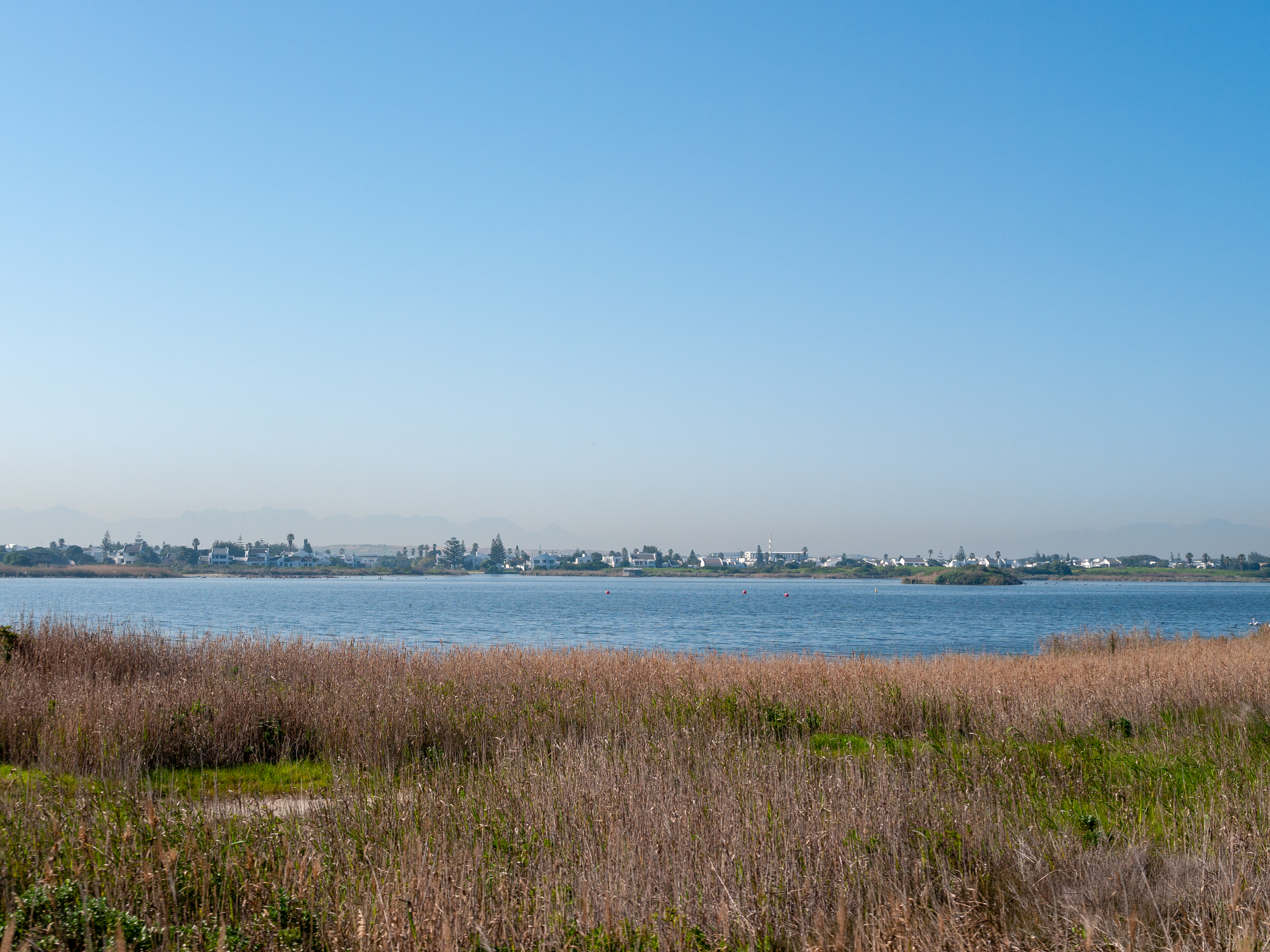
View over the estuary

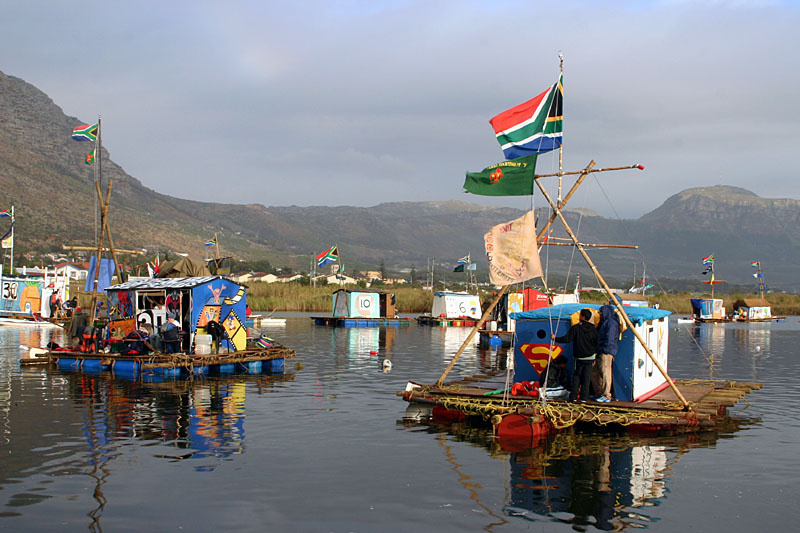
Rafts on Sandvlei during the Kon-Tiki Adventure for Scouts and Guides at Lakeside, Cape Town in 2006

== See also ==
- Biodiversity of Cape Town
- List of nature reserves in Cape Town
- Cape Flats Dune Strandveld
- Cape Lowland Freshwater Wetland
- SCOUTS South Africa
- Kon-Tiki (Scouting)
