= Arthur H. Johnstone =

President of the Boy Scouts of South Africa
- In office 1958–1968

Arthur H. Johnstone served as the Chief Scout and later President of the Boy Scouts of South Africa. In 1971, Johnstone was awarded the 66th Bronze Wolf, the only distinction of the World Organization of the Scout Movement, awarded by the World Scout Committee for exceptional services to world Scouting.

World Organization of the Scout Movement
Preceded by E Percy Fowle	Chief Scout, Boy Scouts of South Africa; 1958–1968	Succeeded by Carveth Geach
