= Girl Guides South Africa =

National Guiding organization of South Africa

- Headquarters: Randburg
- Country: South Africa
- Founded: 1910
- Membership: 20,466
- Affiliation: World Association of Girl Guides and Girl Scouts
- Website http://www.girlguides.org.za/

Brownie	Guide

The Girl Guides South Africa is a girls-only organisation and is recognised by the World Association of Girl Guides and Girl Scouts (WAGGGS). As of 2003 it has 20,466 members.

== Program and ideals ==
The programme of the Girl Guides South Africa caters for girls from 4½ to 25 years of age.

- Teddies 4½–7
- Brownies 7–10
- Guides 10–14
- Rangers and Young Leaders 14–25

There are a number of regions within Girl Guides South Africa, namely:

Eastern Cape

- Butterworth
- Cape East
- Central
- EG Kei
- Mgwali
- Mthatha
- Queenstown

Free State - Orania Gauteng

- Central
- East
- North
- Soweto
- West

KwaZulu Natal

- Coastal
- Inland
- Midlands
- Northern
- Southern

Limpopo Mpumalanga

- East
- West

North West

- Mafikeng
- Rustenburg
- Vryburg

Northern Cape Kuruman Cape West

== Guide Promise ==
I promise to do my best,

To do my duty,

To my god and to my country,

To help other people and to keep the Guide Law

== Guide Motto ==
Be Prepared

== 33rd World Conference ==
The Girl Guides South Africa hosted WAGGGS' 33rd World Conference from 6 to 12 July 2008 in Johannesburg. It was held in the Birchwood Executive Hotel and Conference Centre.

== See also ==
- Scouts South Africa
