= Deutscher Pfadfinderbund in Namibia =

Scouting organisation in Namibia

- Location: Robert Mugabe Avenue, Windhoek
- Country: Namibia
- Founded: 1960s
- Membership: 61

The Deutscher Pfadfinderbund in Namibia (German Scout Association in Namibia) is a small Scouting association open mainly to boys and girls of German descent in Namibia.

The Deutscher Pfadfinderbund in Namibia is one of the 34 members of the German Cultural Council (Namibia) (DKR) in Namibia.

== History ==
Flag of the Scouts in South West Africa before 1939

The Union of German Scouts in South West Africa (German: Bund deutscher Pfadfinder Südwestafrikas), the first German oriented Scouting organization, was founded in 1928 and dissolved by the South African administration in 1939 on the outbreak of World War II. The current association was founded in the 1960s, under the name Deutscher Pfadfinderbund Südwestafrika. After the independence of Namibia in 1990, the organization was renamed to Deutscher Pfadfinderbund Namibia and later to "Deutscher Pfadfinderbund in Namibia". In 2010, there were three groups across the country with fewer than 100 members.

In 1937, Heinz Anton Klein-Werner wrote the song Südwesterlied for the German Scouts which later became the unofficial national anthem of the German Namibians.

German-speaking Scout units can also be found within the Scouts of Namibia. The Altpfadfindergilde Swakopmund serves former Scouts; it is an extraordinary member of the Verband Deutscher Altpfadfindergilden within the International Scout and Guide Fellowship.
