= Carveth Geach =

Chief Scout of the Boy Scouts of South Africa

Chief Scout of the Boy Scouts of South Africa
- In office 1968–1973

Personal details
- Born: 1928
- Died: 2005 (aged 76–77)

Carveth Geach (1928–2005) served as the Chief Scout of the Boy Scouts of South Africa.

In 1990, Geach was awarded the 205th Bronze Wolf, the only distinction of the World Organization of the Scout Movement, awarded by the World Scout Committee for exceptional services to world Scouting.

World Organization of the Scout Movement
Preceded by Arthur H. Johnstone	Chief Scout, Boy Scouts of South Africa; 1968–1973	Succeeded by Charles A. Martin
