= The Girl Guides Association of Namibia =

National Guiding organization of Namibia

- Country: Namibia
- Founded: 1923
- Membership: 1,124
- Affiliation: World Association of Girl Guides and Girl Scouts

The Girl Guides Association of Namibia is the national Guiding organization of Namibia. It serves 1,124 members (as of 2003). Founded in 1923 as the Girl Guides Association of South-West Africa, the girls-only organization became a full member of the World Association of Girl Guides and Girl Scouts in 1993.

Girl Guides Association of South-West Africa

The Girl Guide emblem features the Welwitschia mirabilis.

== See also ==
- Scouts of Namibia
