= David Geach =

Royal Air Force officer

- Born: July 28, 1923
- Died: February 25, 2015 (aged 91)
- Military career
- Allegiance: United Kingdom
- Branch: Royal Air Force
- Conflicts: Second World War

David Gilbert Geach OBE (28 July 1923 – 25 February 2015) was a Royal Air Force bomb aimer during the Second World War. After the war, Geach was Registrar of Business Names for England and Wales until 1982. He also fought a long and ultimately successful campaign to have a memorial erected to lost RAF fliers at Lord's in London.
