= Muizenberg =

Coastal town in the Western Cape, South Africa

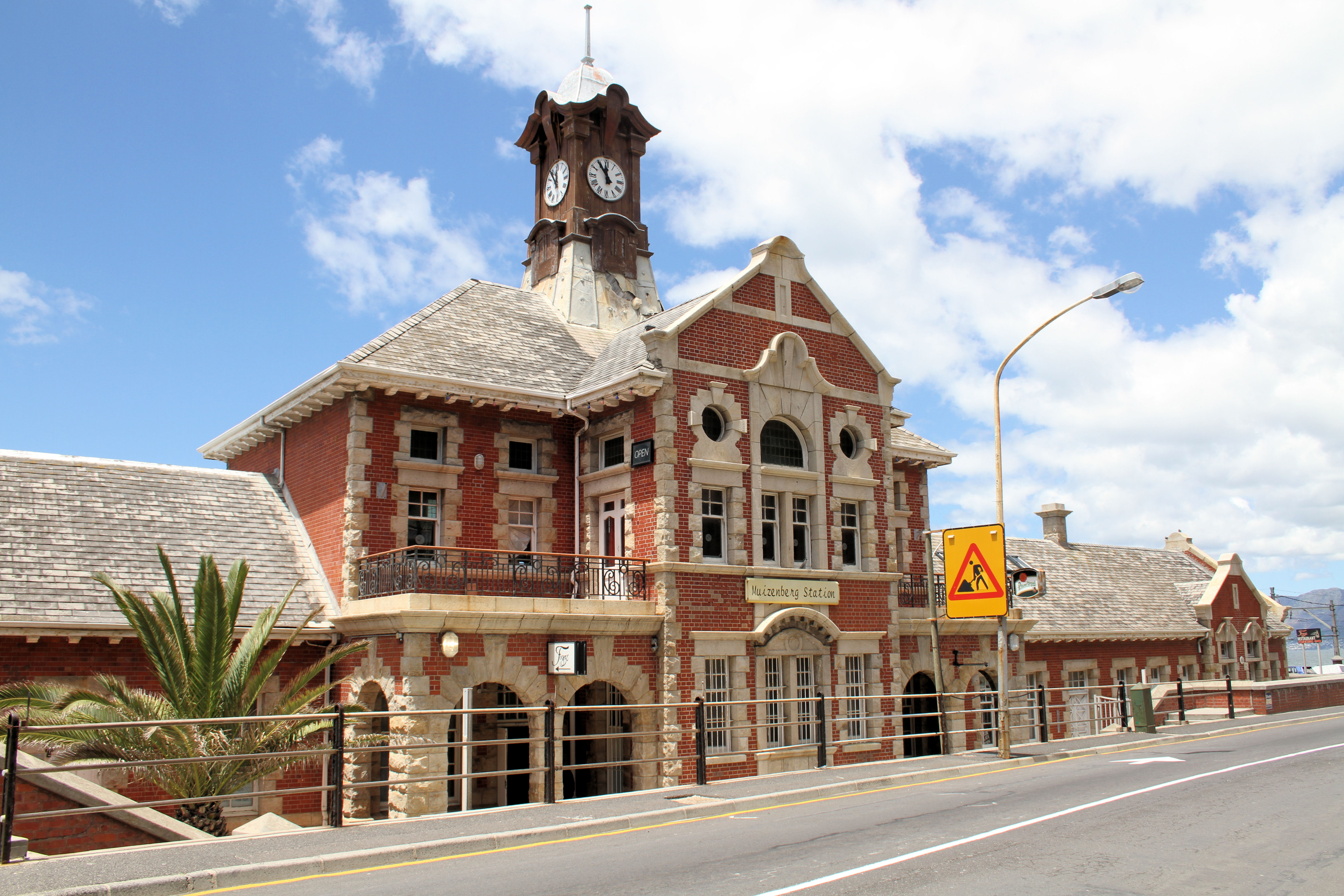
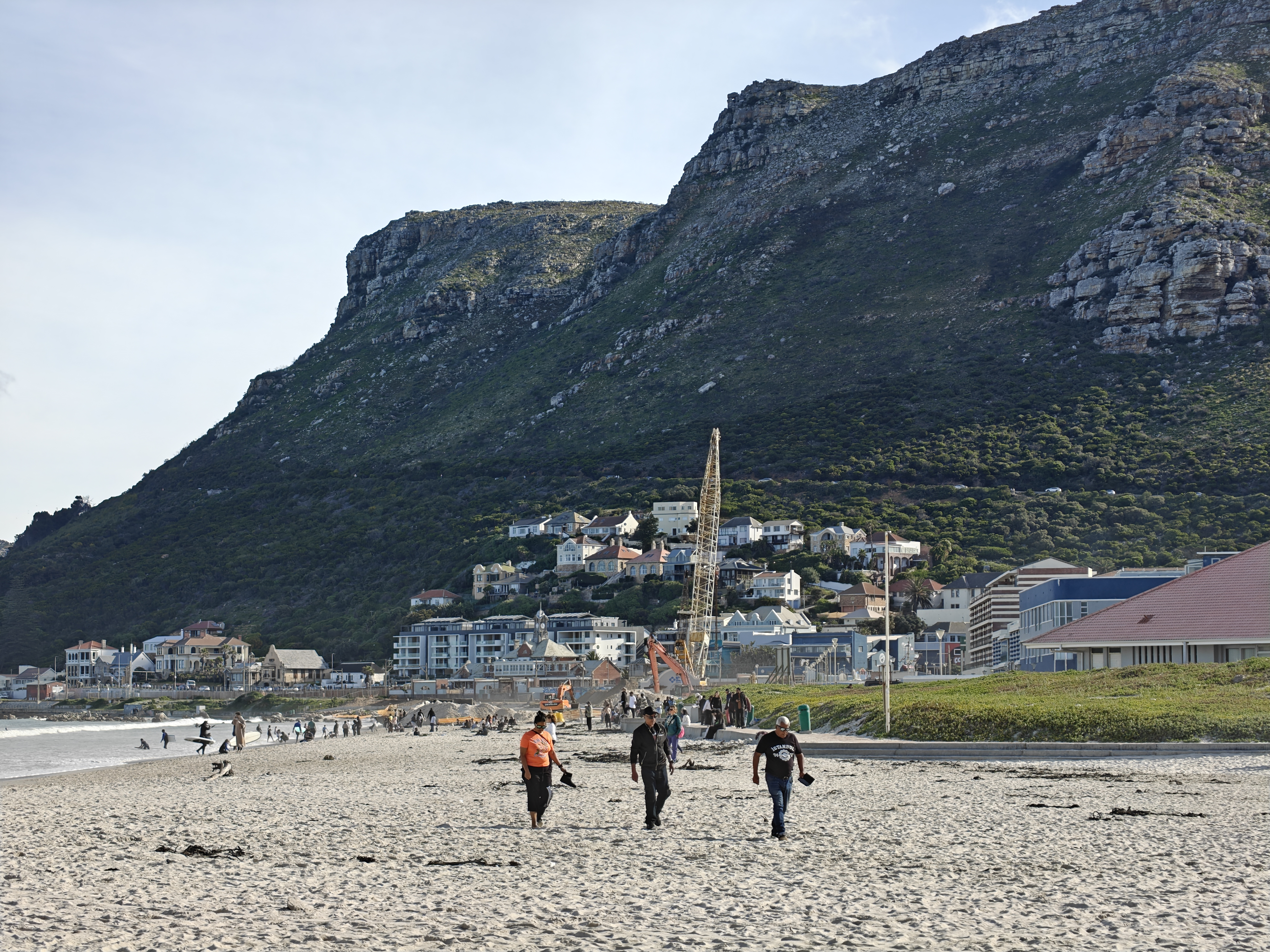
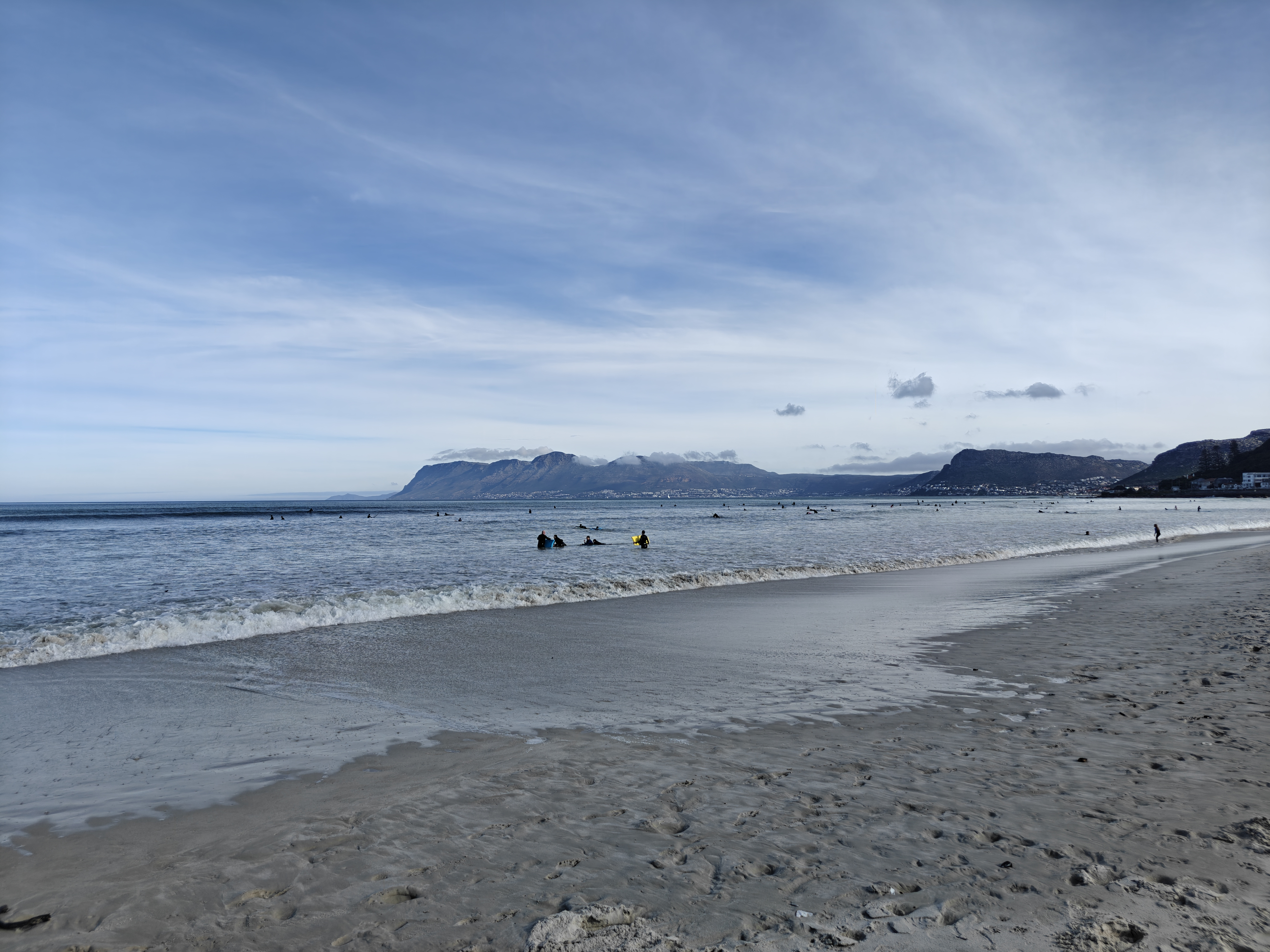
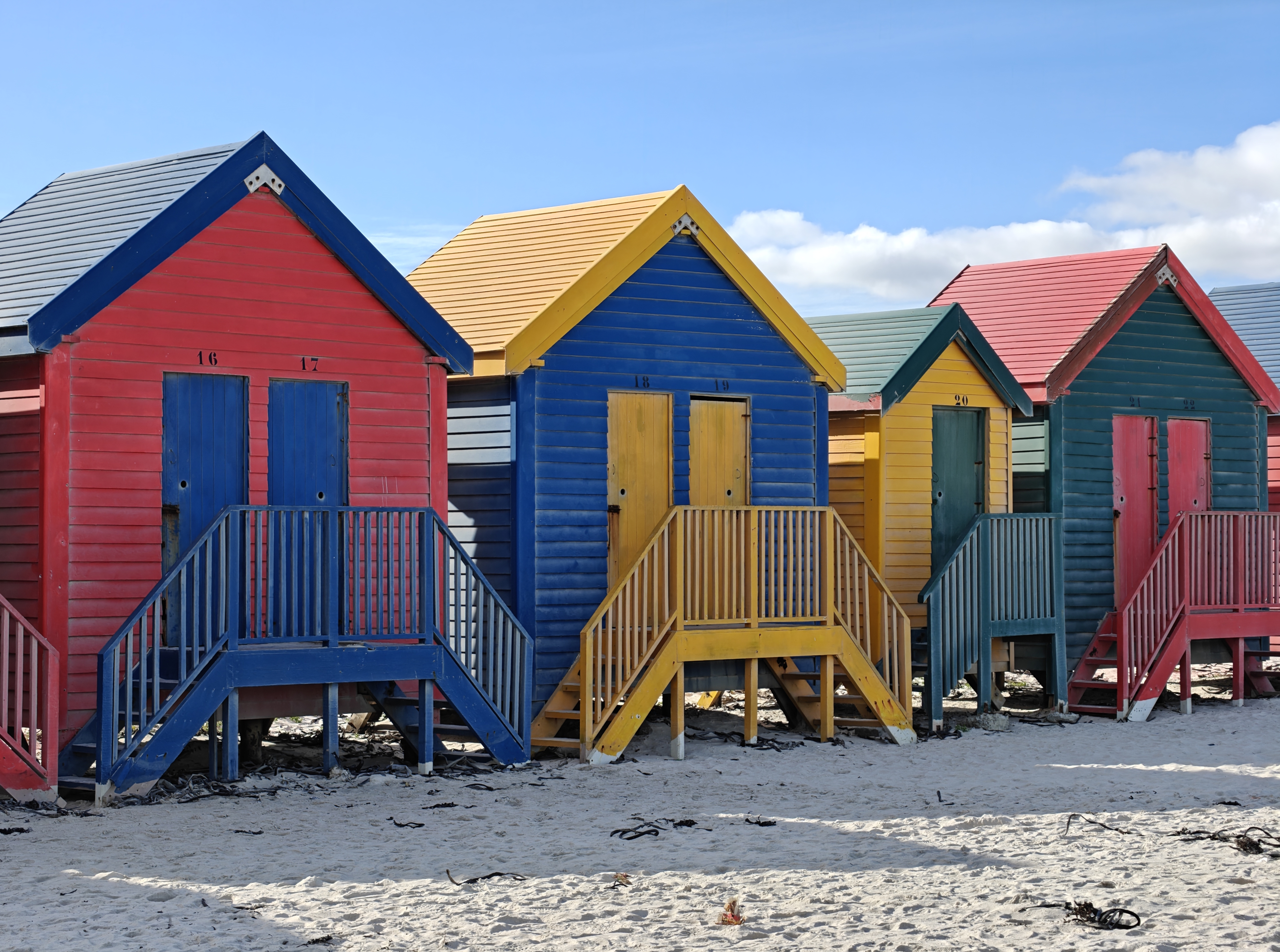
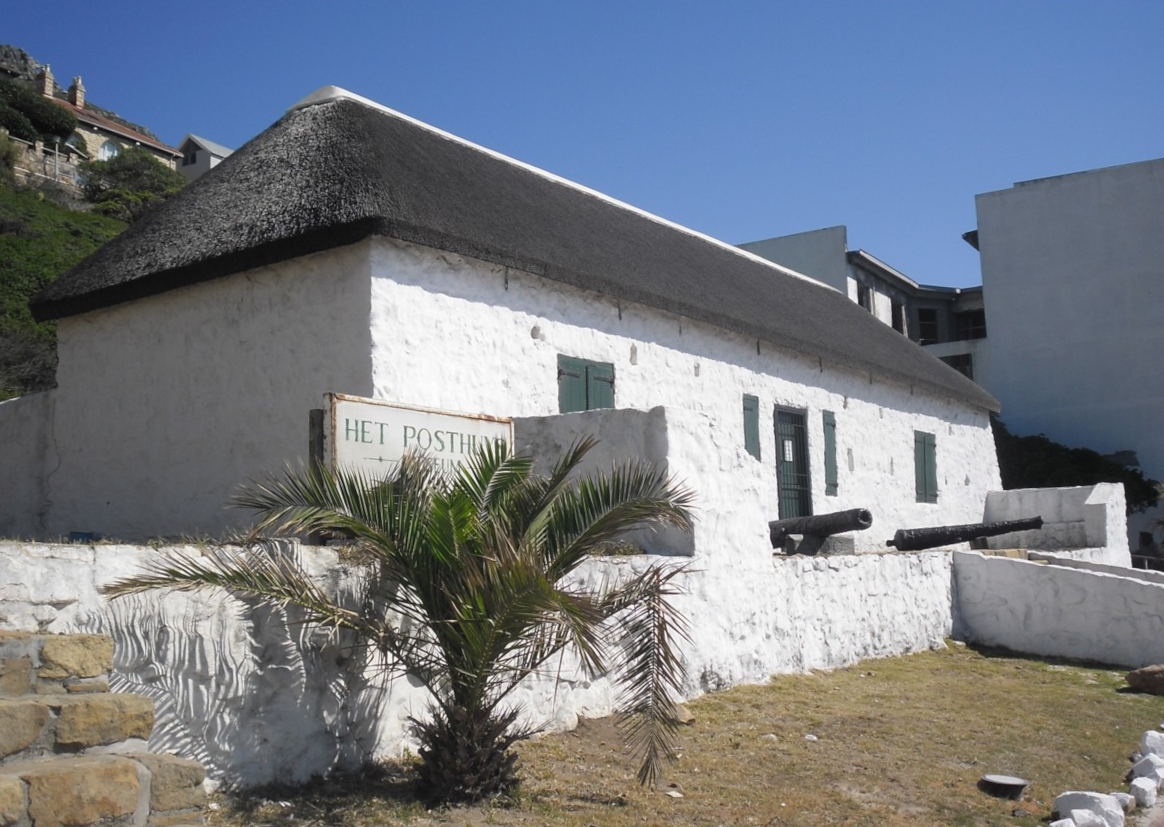
- Clockwise, from top left: Muizenberg railway station; Surfer's corner at night; Muizenberg beach; The historic beach huts on Muizenberg Beach; Het Posthuys, a special historical feature in Muizenberg
- Interactive map of Muizenberg
- Coordinates: 34°06′20″S 18°28′05″E
- Country: South Africa
- Province: Western Cape
- Municipality: City of Cape Town
- Established: 1895; 131 years ago

Area
  - Total: 15.14 km^{2} (5.85 sq mi)

Population (2011)
  - Total: 36,857
  - Density: 2,434/km^{2} (6,305/sq mi)

Racial makeup (2011)
  - Black African: 39.1%
  - Coloured: 26.2%
  - Indian/Asian: 1.3%
  - White: 27.8%
  - Other: 5.7%

First languages (2011)
  - English: 44.3%
  - Afrikaans: 22.8%
  - Xhosa: 15.3%
  - Zulu: 1.4%
  - Other: 16.2%
- Time zone: UTC+2 (SAST)
- Postal code (street): 7945
- PO box: 7950
- Area code: 021

Muizenberg (/ˈmjuːzənbɜːrɡ/ MEW-zən-burg, Afrikaans: [ˈmœysənbærχ]; Dutch for 'Mouse Mountain') is a beachside suburb and former town, situated right at the bottom of the Southern Suburbs region of Cape Town, South Africa.

Located where the shore of the Cape Peninsula curves round to the east on the False Bay coast, Muizenberg is considered to be the main surfing spot in Cape Town, and is home to a surfing community centered on the popular Surfer's Corner section of the suburb's beach.

== History ==
Muizenberg was apparently named after Wynand Willem Muijs, who commanded a small outpost on the shore of Zandvlei in 1743.

The Battle of Muizenberg was a small but significant military affair that began on 7 August 1795, and ended three months later with the first British occupation of the Cape. Thus began the period, briefly interrupted from 1803 to 1806, of British control of the Cape, and subsequently much of Southern Africa.

The historical remnant of the Battle of Muizenberg is a site on the hillside overlooking False Bay that holds the remains of a defensive fort, started by the Dutch in 1795, and expanded by the British from 1796 onwards. Cannons from that era are mounted at Het Posthuys, the Muizenberg Park, and on the local rail station platform.

The railway from Cape Town CBD, which for twenty years terminated at Wynberg, was extended to Muizenberg in 1882. Muizenberg started as a place for holiday homes for the rich after the discovery of gold in the Witwatersrand in 1886.

The Muizenberg Municipality was established in 1895. It merged with Kalk Bay in 1897.

In 1910, the Muizenberg Carnegie Library opened next to the Natale Labia, and a year later a post office opened. In 1911 the first pavilion, a wooden one, was built. In the twentieth century, Muizenberg was the premier summer destination among Southern African Jews. The post office was bombed in 1986, injuring the postman.

=== Beachfront upgrades ===
In December 2024, the City of Cape Town announced that it would commence with a major Muizenberg beachfront upgrade in February 2025. It confirmed that stakeholder engagements had begun. The project included replacing the beach's aged seawalls and major upgrades to public amenities, and had a target completion date of the end of 2026. The City said the project would be completed in phases, starting at the western section of Surfer's Corner, and that the beach would remain open throughout.

In January 2026, the City provided an update on the beachfront upgrades. A crane was erected near Surfer's Corner to place the new stepped retaining wall. A temporary gravel parking area and temporary pedestrian access were established, and both Shark Spotters and Waves for Change were temporarily relocated. The City confirmed that the eight famous beach huts would be replaced with new ones, keeping the historic design and colors. As part of the project, an upgraded promenade would be built, set back 2 meters further inland than the previous walkway, due to climate change and so as not to narrow the beachfront.

Muizenberg Beach seawall construction, August 2026
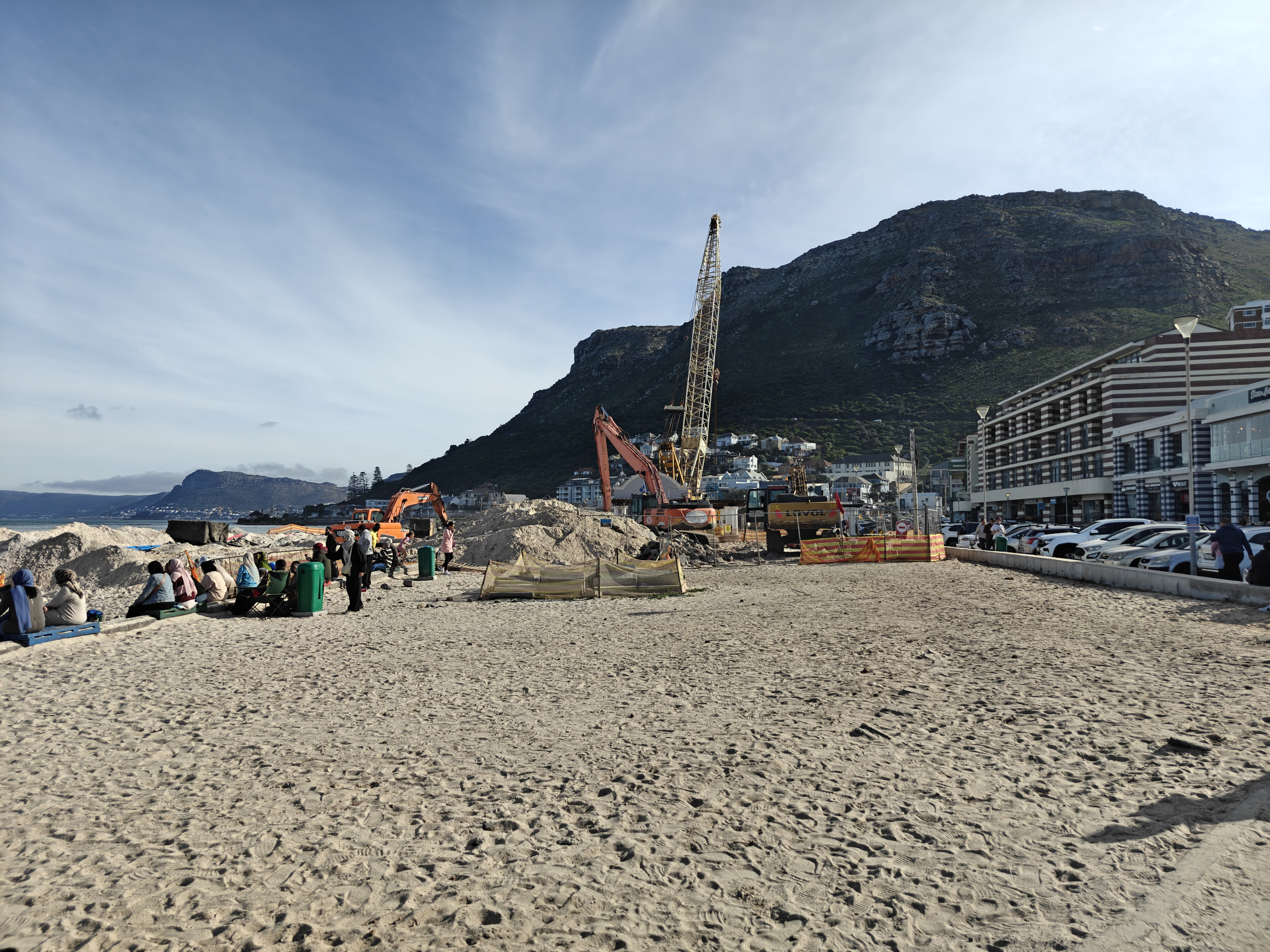
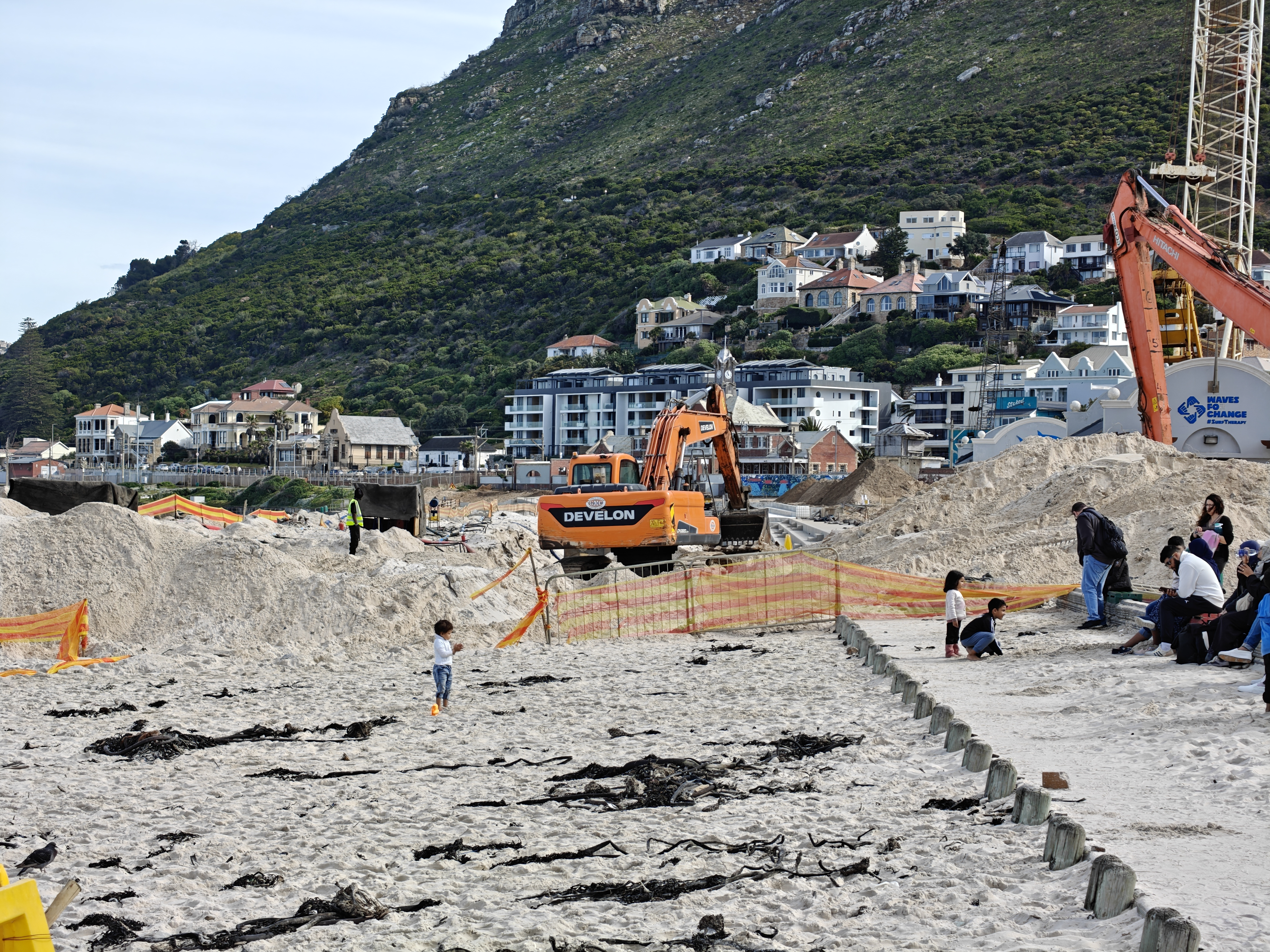

In March 2026, the City confirmed that around 15% of the concrete precast units for the beach's new walkway has been placed, and that the project was on track for completion before the end of the year. By July 2026, 60% of the precast steps had been placed.

In July 2026, the City announced that a private donor family, who requested to remain anonymous, had provided funds to extend the St James walkway. In at act of civic generosity, the family approached Cape Town Mayor Geordin Hill-Lewis in 2025 and offered to contribute towards extending the walkway. The City said that the family's funding went towards Phase 1 of the extension. The overall project has the goal of installing the walkway from Surfer's Corner on Muizenberg Beach, through St James, and along to Clovelly Corner. As part of the announcement, the City confirmed that it had appointed a team of coastal engineers, tasked with creating a high-level concept design and estimating the preliminary costs for the project.

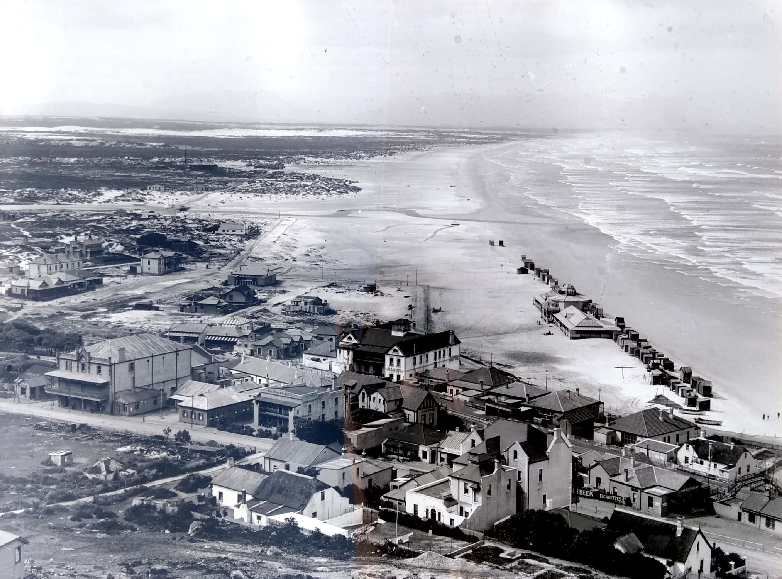
Muizenberg Beach around 1920

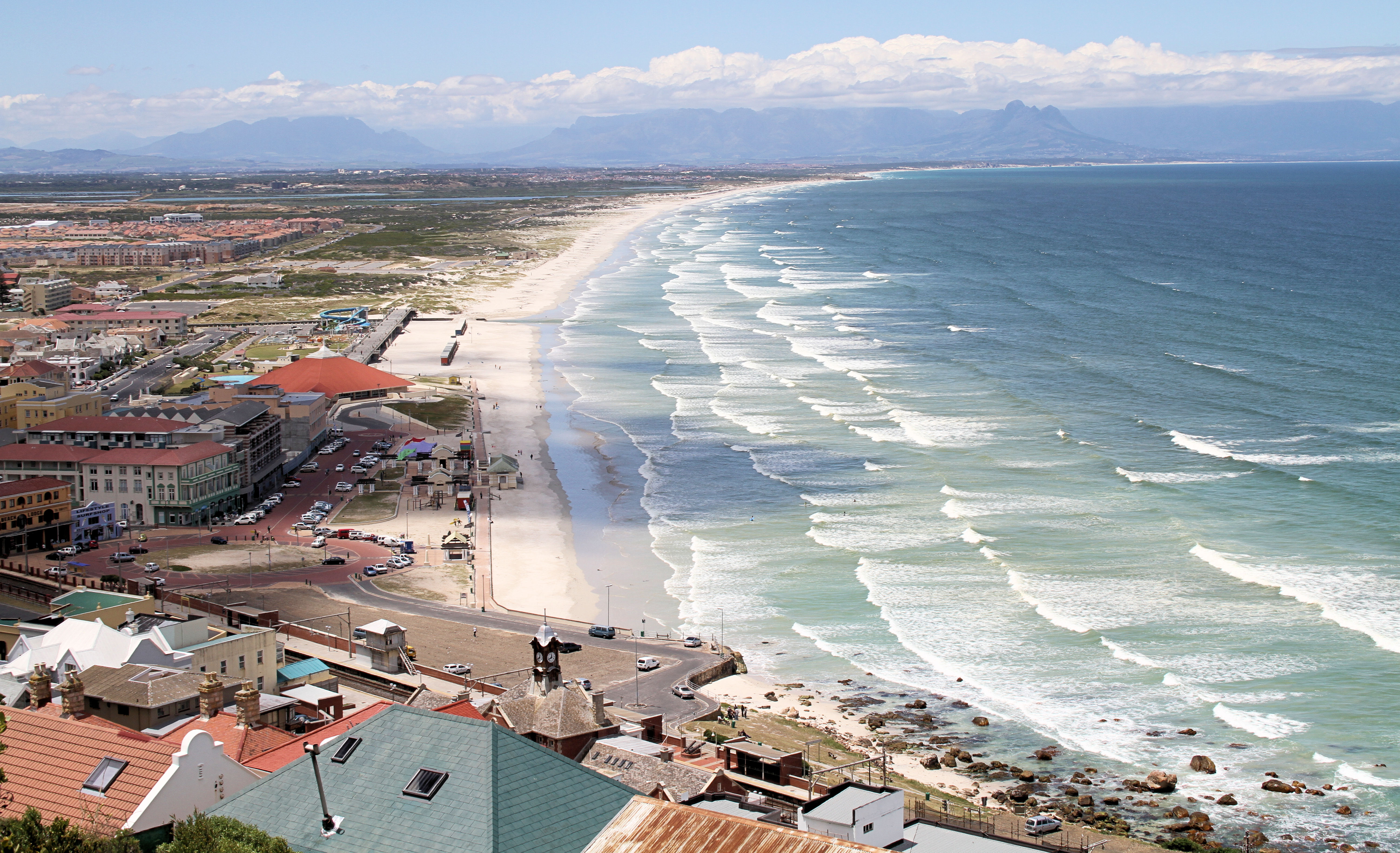
Muizenberg Beach in 2010

== Buildings ==
The famous architect, Sir Herbert Baker, designed his house "Sand Hills" on Atlantic Road, was the architect for "Vergenoegd" further along the same road, and designed "Coel an Mar" on Main Road.

Many of the buildings in Muizenberg date from the resort town's heyday and are built in the art deco style. At its peak the Muizenberg beachfront attracted masses of holiday-makers and the beach in front of the pavilion earned the name "The Snake Pit". It boasted a large Jewish population that attended the synagogue in Camp Rd. The community is celebrated in a book called "The Stetl by the Sea".

=== Rhodes Cottage ===
Rhodes' Cottage is a small house on the seafront that Cecil Rhodes bought as a holiday cottage and this was where he died in 1902. The house is preserved as a museum dedicated to Rhodes' life and is open to the public.

=== Het Posthuys ===
Het Posthuys is one of the oldest buildings in South Africa, originally erected in February 1673: a year before the Castle in Cape Town was occupied. It was built by the Dutch East India Company (Vereenigde Oost-Indische Compagnie or VOC), originally as a three-roomed signal station, and used as a military observation post, and subsequently used as a toll-house to levy a tax on farmers passing by to sell their produce to ships lying in Simon's Bay.

One of the early postholders was Sergeant Muys (meaning "mouse"), from whom Muizenberg (formerly Muysenbergh and Muys Zijn Bergh (Muys' mountain) before that) gets its name. After a varied career as a police station, stables, brothel, hotel and private house the building was identified for what it was in the 1980s and restored with funds from Anglo American Corporation.

The house is cared for by the Muizenberg Historical Conservation Society and contains a small collection of photos and items of interest relating to early days in Muizenberg. It is open to the public.

=== Casa Labia ===
The Muizenberg Battle site flanks the home of the first Italian Envoy Extraordinary and Minister Plenipotentiary to South Africa, Prince Natale Labia. Originally called "The Fort" after the site of the battle, it now bears the name Casa Labia and is a restaurant, conference centre and music venue. The house was built by skilled Italian artisans and houses part of the Labia family's extensive art collection.

Behind Casa Labia lies the grave site of Abe Bailey, one of South Africa's early and important mine magnates. The graveyard is maintained by the Muizenberg Historical Conservation Society. One of the few houses on the sea side of the railway line, is the thatched cottage owned by Bailey and called Bailey's Cottage. This is owned by the South African Navy.

=== Pavilion ===
There have been three pavilions built in Muizenberg - the first was a wooden one built in 1911. The next had bathing cubicles, a tearoom, and a 900-seat theatre, built in 1929. This was demolished in 1970, and a third one, still standing, was built.

=== Muizenberg Shul ===
Muizenberg Shul is a modern orthodox synagogue on Camp Road. The red-and-white painted building dates from the 1920s and ‘30s. The synagogue has a full-time rabbi and is open for Shabbat services and for the Jewish holidays.

In 2022, the Shul's rabbi, Ryan Newman said: “Muizenberg may be the largest Jewish community in South Africa during the holidays. We have a minyan of over fifty men every single day. You can’t walk a minute on the beach without seeing a group of people you know sitting together. The amazing thing is that you see Jews here from across the spectrum of Orthodoxy. You have people – and often very different rabbis – from Chabad, Mizrachi, Ohr Somayach, etc. all joining together in a single shul.”

== Present day ==
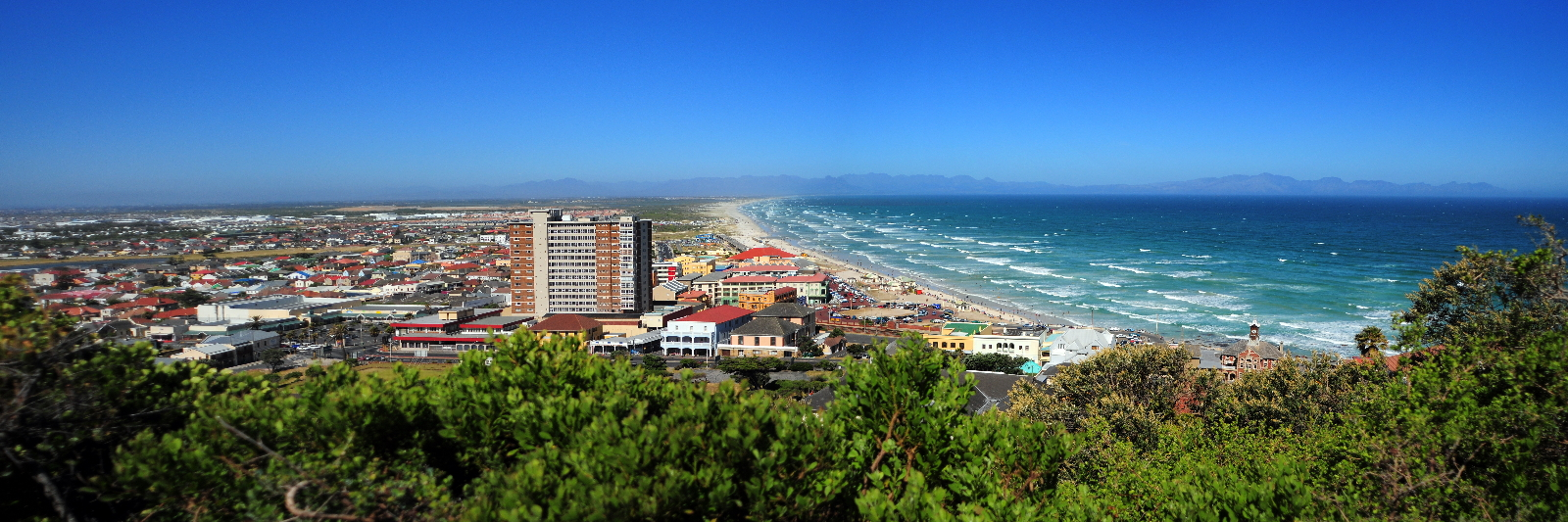
View eastward along Muizenberg Beach

Muizenberg has a fine, long beach that in effect stretches all the way round the top of False Bay to the Strand, a distance of over 20 km. False Bay, known for its population of White Sharks, also has a shark watch service that operates from Muizenberg, signalling alerts when sharks come in proximity of bathers at the main beach and surfers at Surfer's Corner.

Above Muizenberg there is a line of steep cliffs that is very popular as a venue for rock climbing. However, certain parts of the cliff are off-limits to climbers when birds nest on the ledges.

The Zandvlei estuary enters the ocean in Muizenberg. The estuary is one of the most important estuaries for fish spawning on the coastline and is home to the Imperial Yacht Club, Peninsula Canoe Club and Sandvlei Sea Scout Base.

=== Educational establishments ===
Muizenberg houses one of the False Bay College campuses in the Cinnabar Building, a high-rise apartment tower. The college, a Public Further Education and Training Institution (FET), was established in September 2002 when the South Peninsula College (established 1970) and the Westlake College (established 1954) were merged.

Muizenberg is also home to the African Institute for Mathematical Sciences (AIMS), a pan-African centre for education and research in mathematical sciences.

=== Beachfront ===
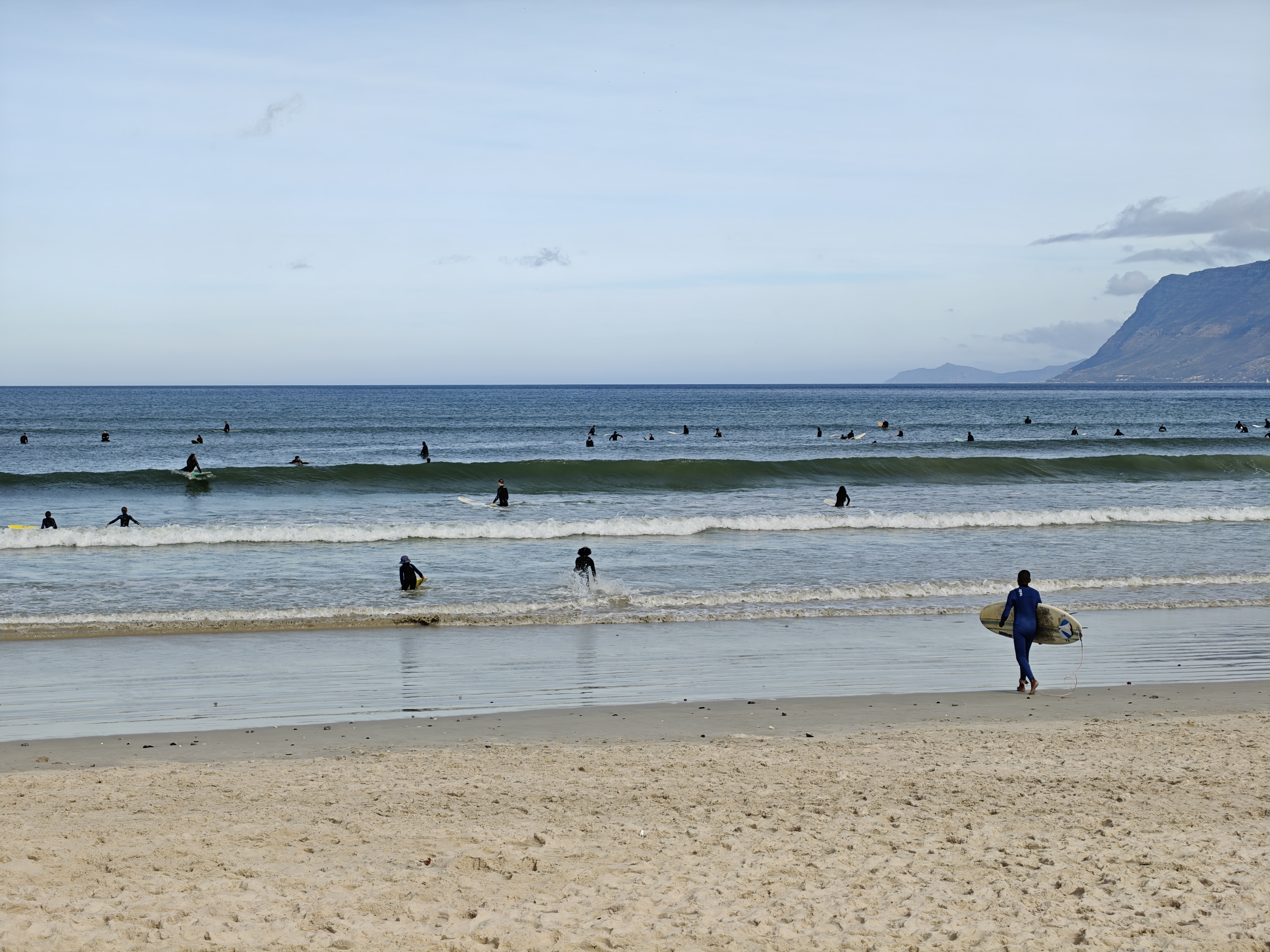
Surfer's Corner at Muizenberg Beach

Muizenberg is home to the well known "Surfers Corner", there is a range of restaurants and coffee shops in the area. Surf shops are also very present in the area.

Agatha Christie, famous author and playwright, wrote that after nursing duty she would daily take the train to Muizenberg to go surfing.

== Geography ==
Muizenberg is located approximately 27 km south-east of Cape Town’s CBD by road and is bounded by Kalk Bay to the south-west, the suburbs of Lavender Hill, Seawinds, Coniston Park, Sheraton Park, Retreat and Westlake to the north and Grassy Park to the north-west.

The older part of the town known as Muizenberg Village occupies the foot slopes of the Muizenberg Mountain, whilst the newer suburbs have spread eastwards along the flat expanse of land, known as the Cape Flats, bordering the lake of Zandvlei to the west.

The municipal boundaries of Muizenberg comprises Muizenberg Village and the following other suburbs:

- Capricorn
- Costa da Gama
- Lakeside
- Marina da Gama
- St James
- Stonehurst Mountain Estate
- Vrygrond

== Transport ==
=== Rail ===
The Muizenberg railway station is situated on the main commuter to connect line between Cape Town and Simon’s Town, known as the Southern Line which is operated by Metrorail. Metrorail currently operates commuter railway services in Muizenberg from the False Bay, Lakeside, Muizenberg, and St James railway stations to Cape Town, Kalk Bay, Fish Hoek and Simon’s Town.

=== Roads ===
The main thoroughfare through Muizenberg is the M4 (Main Road) which roughly runs in a north-south direction from Cape Town towards Kalk Bay, Fish Hoek and Simon’s Town. The R310 is another major route roughly running NE to SW from Stellenbosch and Mitchells Plain to Muizenberg and runs through Muizenberg as Atlantic Road and Baden Powell Drive.

Muizenberg is also intersected by other metropolitan routes within the City of Cape Town including the M5 (Prince George Drive) linking Muizenberg with Cape Town and Milnerton and the M75 (Boyes Drive) skirting above Muizenberg along the lower slopes of the Muizenberg Mountains towards Kalk Bay.

The M3 expressway (Simon van der Stel Freeway) runs northwards to Cape Town’s CBD from the intersection with the M42 (Steenberg Drive) in Westlake. The M42 then connects the M3 to Muizenberg from the intersection with the M4 near Lakeside.

== Commerce ==
Muizenberg is home to the roastery of South Africa's second-largest coffeehouse chain by number of locations - Seattle Coffee Company.

The suburb is home to The Muize, a shopping center whose anchor tenant is Checkers. Nearby malls include The Old Bakery in Lakeside, The Arcade in Fish Hoek, and Blue Route Mall in Tokai.

== Nearby places of interest ==
- Zandvlei Estuary Nature Reserve
- Rondevlei Nature Reserve
- Kalk Bay Harbour
- Peck's Valley
- Table Mountain Nature Reserve above Boyes Drive

== Gallery ==
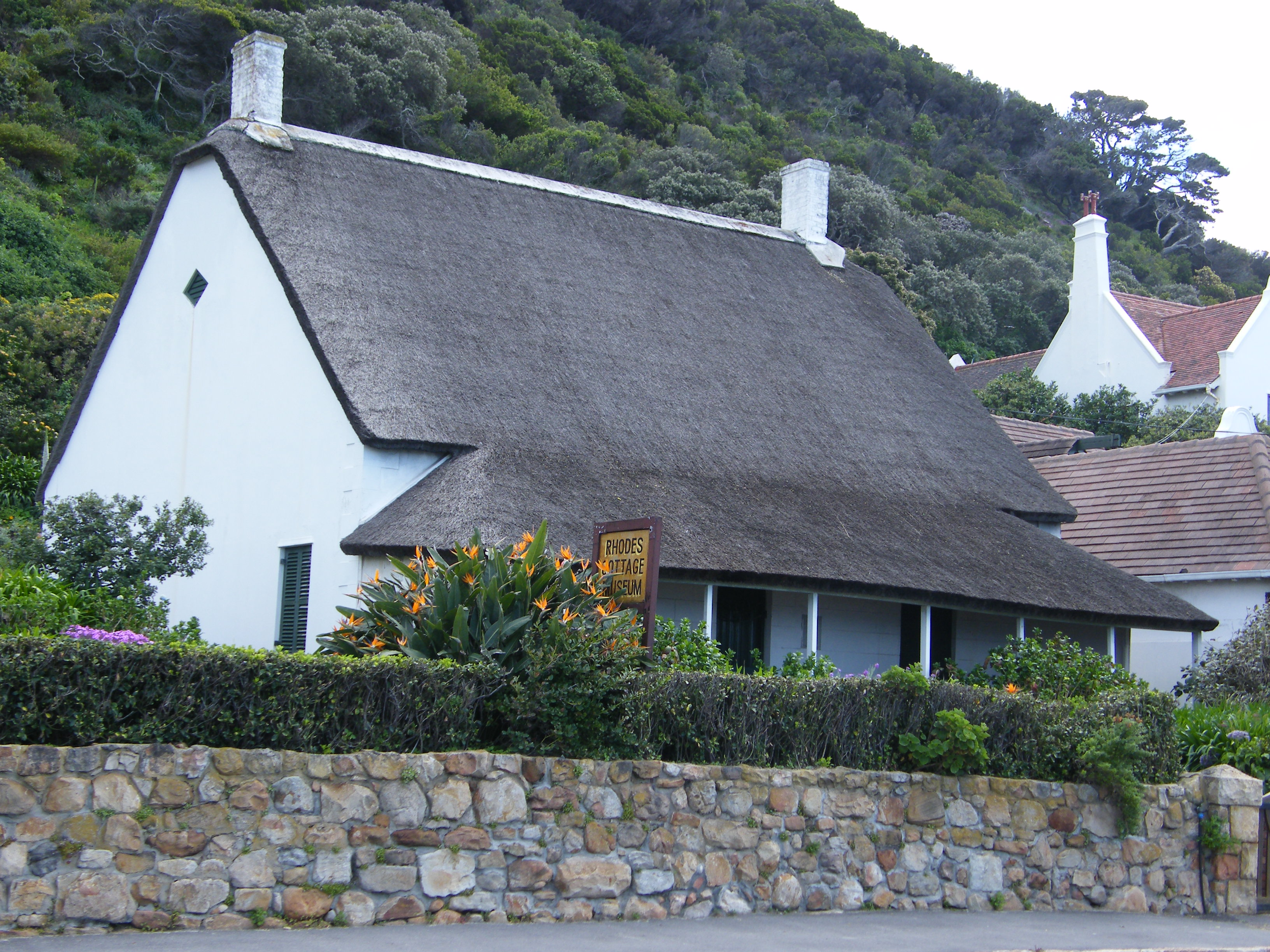
Rhodes Cottage

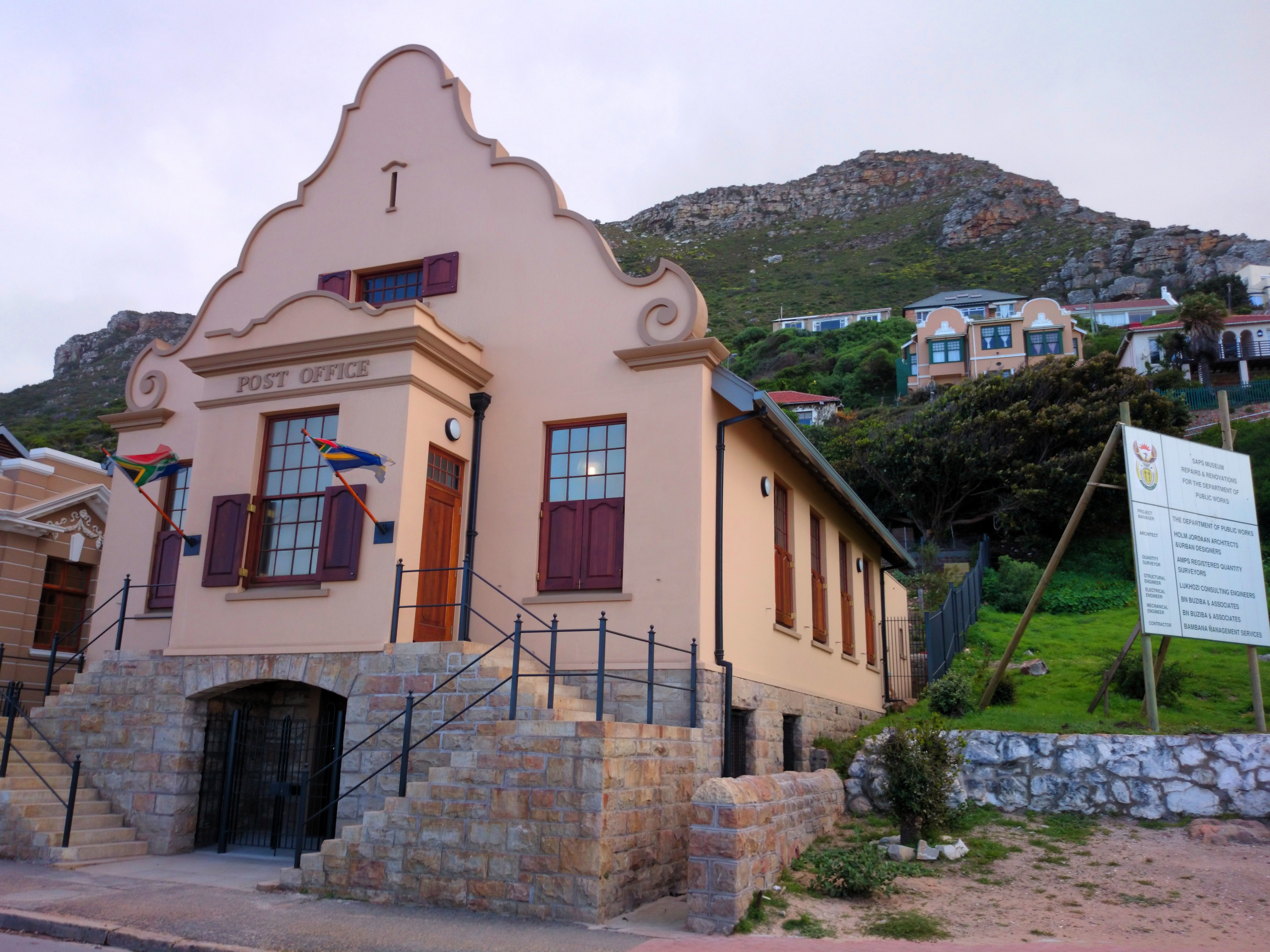
Muizenberg's historical post office

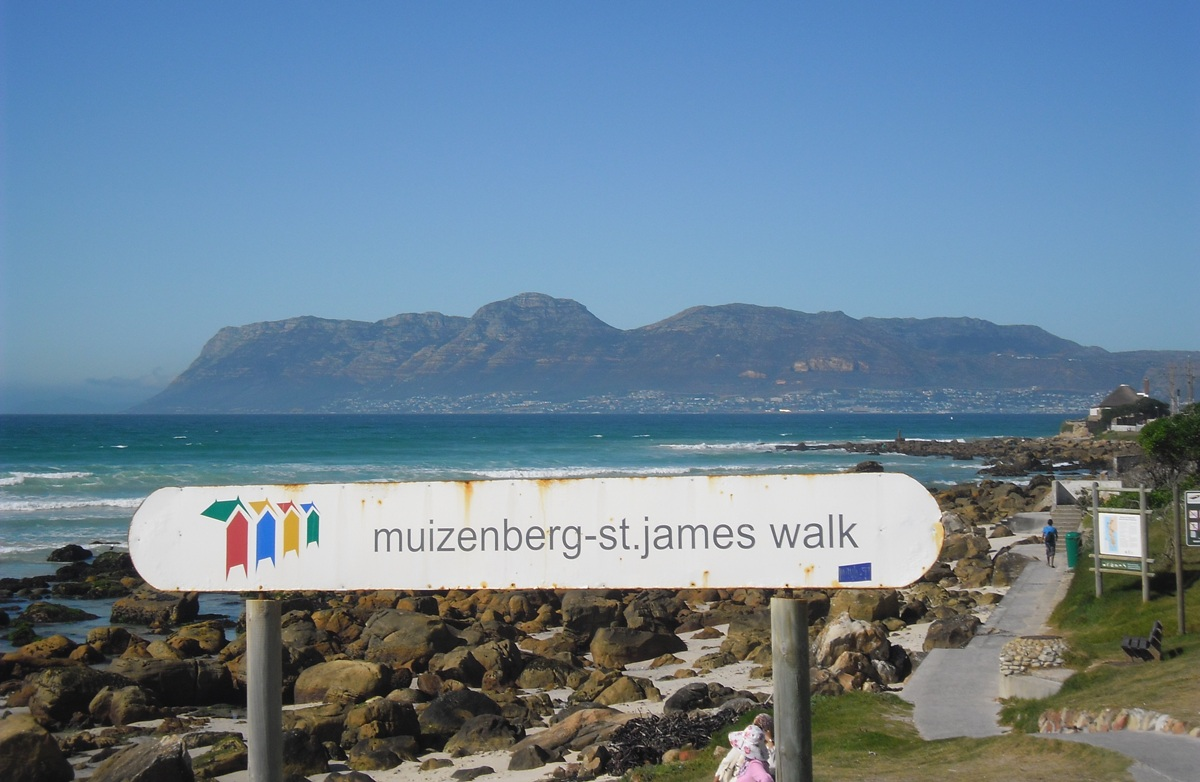
Walkway from Muizenberg to the neighboring community of St James

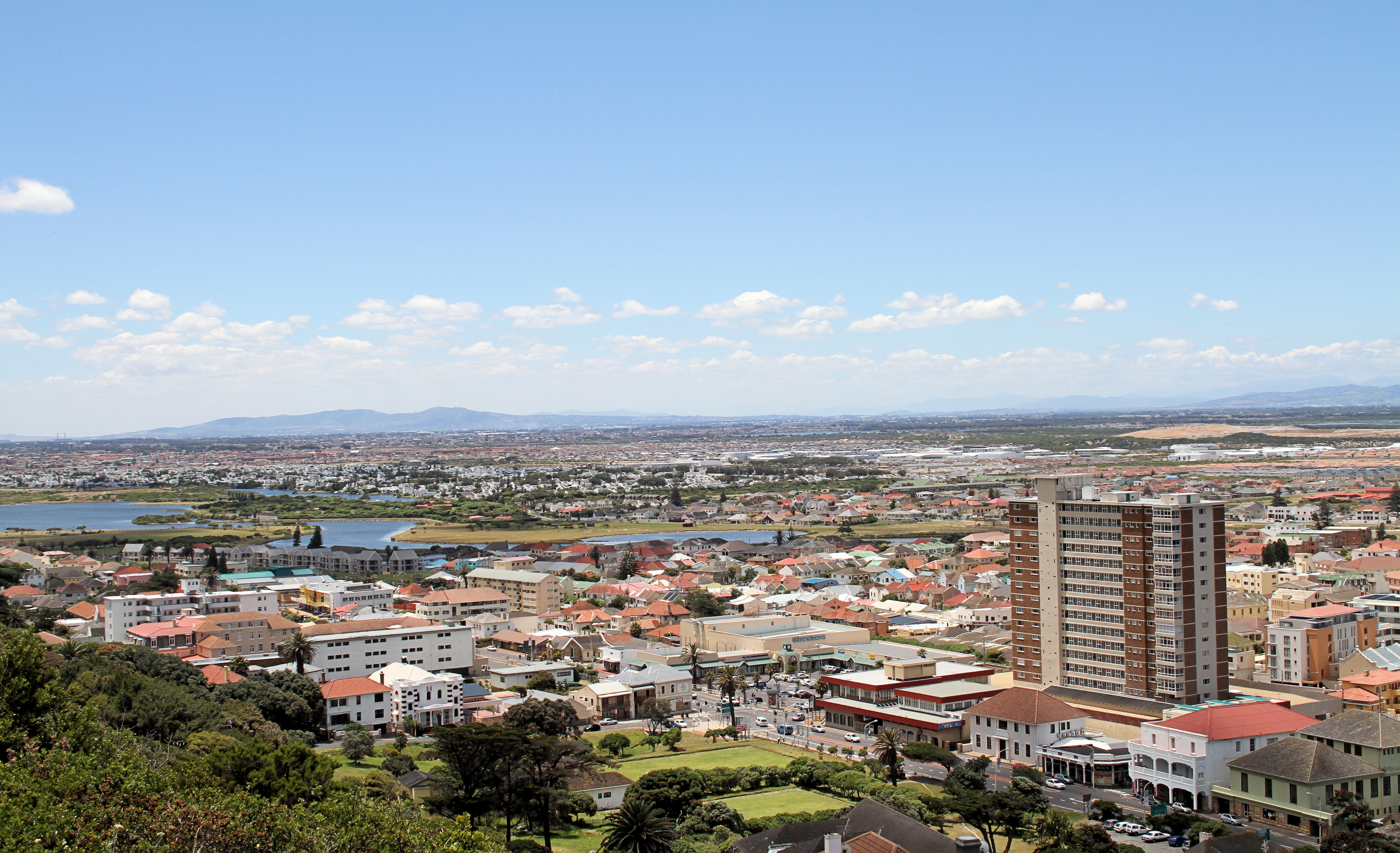
Muizenberg, including Zandvlei

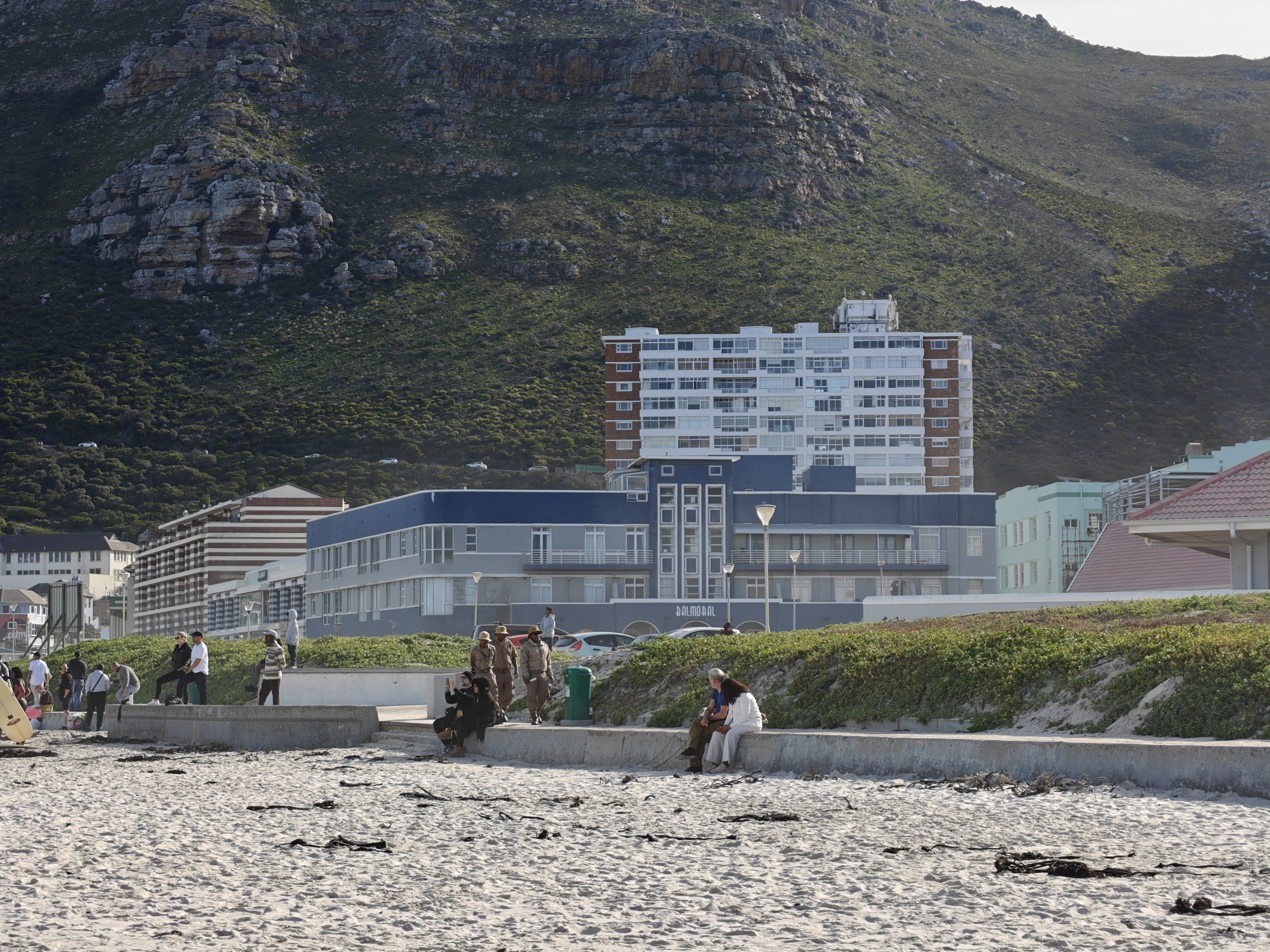
Buildings on the Muizenberg Beachfront

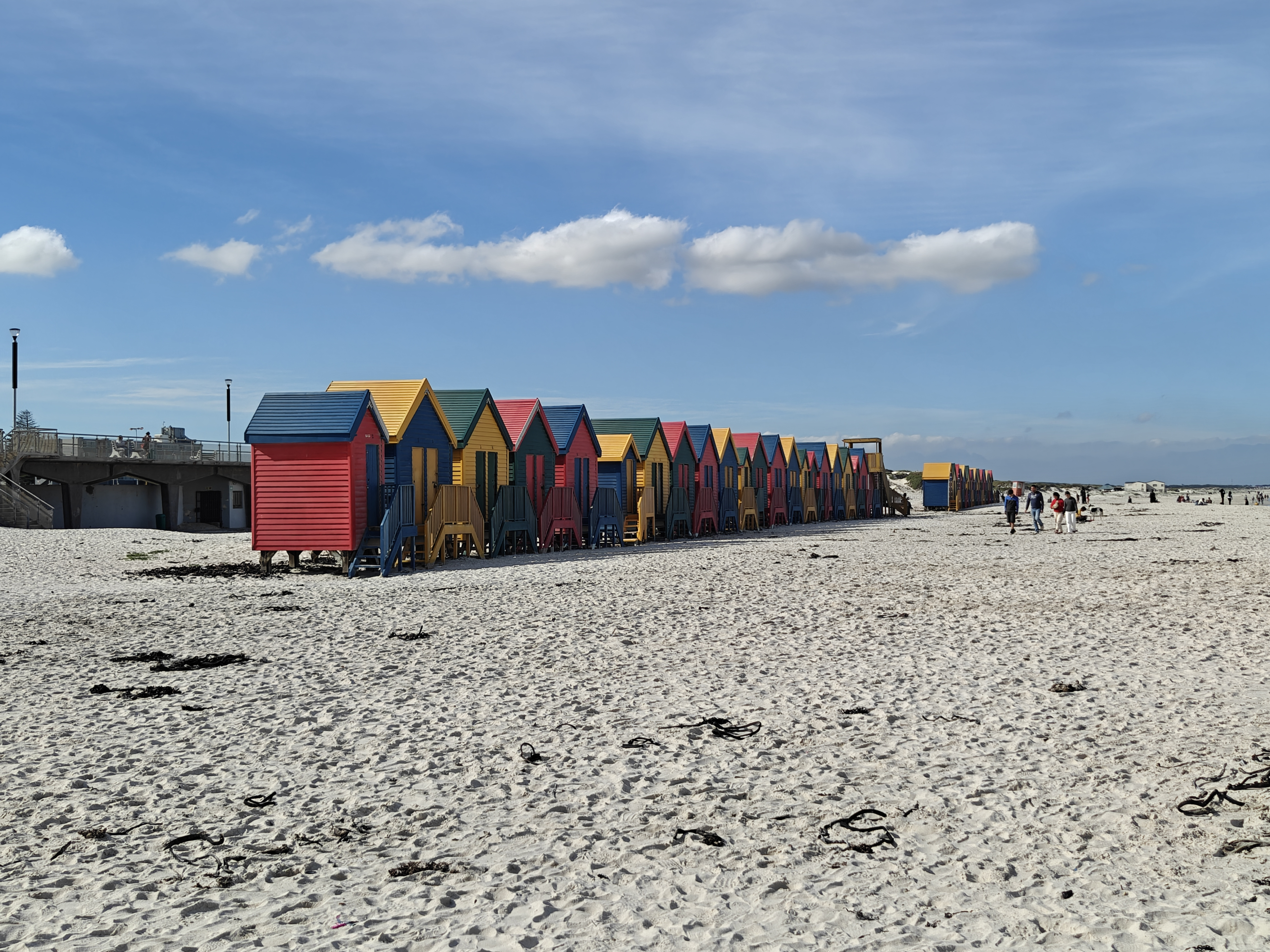
Beach huts along Muizenberg Beach

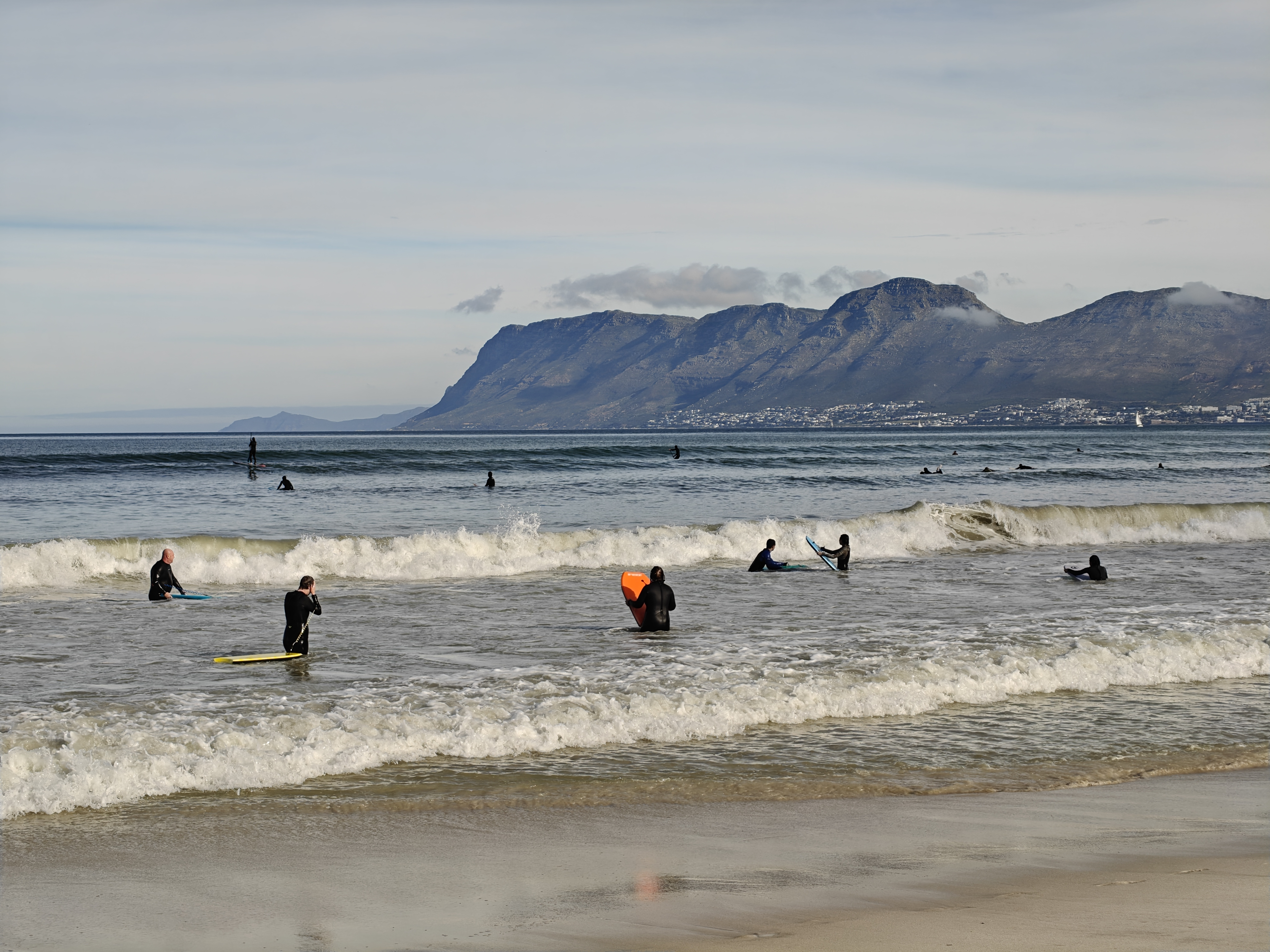
Surfers at Muizenberg Beach
