= Jan Grootboom =

Xhosa scout

Jan Grootboom was a Xhosa scout from the Eastern Cape, South Africa who followed and taught Robert Baden-Powell scouting skills during the Matabele campaign.
