= Scouts of Namibia =

National Scouting organization of Namibia

- Headquarters: 2 Parsival Street
- Location: Windhoek
- Country: Namibia
- Founded: 1917/1990
- Membership: 2,845
- Chief Scout: Jim Kastelic
- Affiliation: World Organization of the Scout Movement

The Scouts of Namibia is the national Scouting organization of Namibia. It serves 2,845 Scouts (as of 2011).

Scouting was founded in South West Africa in 1917 and until 1990, Scouting was served by the South West Africa Division of the Boy Scouts of South Africa. Namibia became a member of the World Organization of the Scout Movement in 1990.

The coeducational Scouts of Namibia are actively supported by the KFUM-Spejderne i Danmark.

== Program ==
=== Program sections ===
The association is divided in three sections:

- Cub Scout - ages 7 to 12
- Scouts - ages 12 to 18
- Rovers - ages 18 to 26

The Rover section was introduced in 2006.

=== Scout Promise ===
On my honour I promise that I will do my best:
To do my duty to God, and my Country;
To help other people at all times;
To obey the Scout Law.

=== Scout Law ===
1. A Scout's honour is to be trusted.
2. A Scout is loyal.
3. A Scout's duty is to be useful and to help others.
4. A Scout is a friend to all and a brother to every other Scout.
5. A Scout is courteous.
6. A Scout is a friend of nature.
7. A Scout is obedient.
8. A Scout smiles and whistles under all difficulties.
9. A Scout is thrifty.
10. A Scout is clean in thought, word and deed.

== Emblem ==
Historic membership badge of the South West Africa Division

The membership badge of the Scouts of Namibia incorporates the national colours of the flag of Namibia, using the same basic pattern as the historic membership badge used by the South West Africa Division, which was part of the Boy Scouts of South Africa until 1990.

== See also ==
- The Girl Guides Association of Namibia
- Deutscher Pfadfinderbund Namibia
