= Scouts South Africa =

National Scout association in South Africa

- Headquarters: Cape Town
- Country: South Africa
- Founded: 1908
- Membership: 30 000
- Chief Scout: Khonzaphi Mdaka
- Website www.scouts.org.za

| Scout | Sea Scout | Air Scout |

Scouts South Africa is the World Organization of the Scout Movement (WOSM) recognised Scout association in South Africa. Scouting began in the United Kingdom in 1907 through the efforts of Robert Baden-Powell and rapidly spread to South Africa, with the first Scout troops appearing in 1908. South Africa has contributed many traditions and symbols to World Scouting.

Scouts South Africa caters for youth and young adults from the ages of 5 through 30. It is split into four sections – Meerkats, Cubs, Scouts, and Rovers – with each section serving a different age group and concentrating on different areas of personal development. It is also one of the largest youth organisations in the rural parts of South Africa and performs many community upliftment programmes in those areas.

The highest award attainable by a Scout in South Africa is the Springbok award. A Scout is required to complete all the requirements for the Springbok award before their 18th birthday.

Scouts South Africa was one of the first youth organisations to open its doors to youth and adults of all races in South Africa. This happened on 2 July 1977 at a conference known as Quo Vadis.

== Aims and principles ==
The aim of Scouts South Africa is to contribute to the development of children and young adults in achieving their full potentials as individuals, as responsible members of their local, national, and international communities by training them in citizenship and developing their social, mental, spiritual and physical attributes.

Scouts South Africa is based on the principles of duty to one's God, duty to others, and duty to self. These three principles govern the entire advancement programme and teach the Scout to be loyal to the religion that expresses them, to be loyal to the country in which they reside and to be responsible in their own development.

== History ==
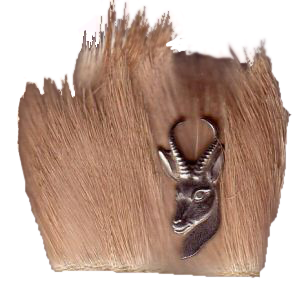
Springbok skin woggle worn by South African Scouts attending World Jamborees

Organized Scouting spread to South Africa only a few months after its birth in Britain in 1907. In 1908, several troops formed in Cape Town, KwaZulu-Natal, and Johannesburg and the following year saw the first official registration of South African troops.

Scouting in South Africa grew rapidly, and in 1912 Robert Baden-Powell visited South African Scouts. Due to the rapid spread of Scouting it became necessary to provide some form of local co-ordination. Provincial Councils were formed in South Africa between 1912 and 1916. These councils had no direct contact with each other and reported directly to Imperial Scout Headquarters in London.

The first Union Scout Council was formed in 1922 to provide a common national control on an advisory basis. Six years later, in 1928, the Union Scout Council adopted a constitution which enabled it to perform the functions of Imperial Scout Headquarters.

Scouting in South Africa, as in most British Colonies (such as Rhodesia), was originally segregated by race. This did not prevent black Scout groups from forming, and in the 1920s, black Scouts were given the name Klipspringers (a type of small antelope). The Pathfinder Council was formed in 1929.

In 1930, the Imperial Scout Headquarters granted the complete independence of the Scout Movement in South Africa. Work started on yet another constitution which was finalised in 1936 at Bloemfontein during the visit of Baden-Powell. During 1937, the Boy Scouts Association of South Africa became a member of the International Scout Conference (now World Scout Conference) and was registered with the International Bureau (now World Scout Bureau) on 1 December 1937. South Africa was the first of the Commonwealth countries to achieve independence for its Scout Movement.

The now independent association maintained the racial segregation with four separate associations. After consultation with Baden-Powell, four separate Scouting organisations were created in 1936. These were The Boy Scouts Association (for whites), The African Boy Scouts Association (for blacks), The Coloured Boy Scouts Association (for coloureds) and The Indian Boy Scouts Association (for Indians). A revision of the 1936 constitution in 1953 even strengthened the whites-only branch: its Chief Scout was now Chief Scout of the three other associations, with each association providing a Chief Scout's Commissioner as executive head under the Chief Scout.

With the rise of Afrikaner nationalism in South Africa during the early part of the 20th century, Scouting was viewed with suspicion by many Afrikaners because of its English roots, and rival Afrikaans organisations including the Voortrekkers were established. These had a strong social and political aim. Negotiations about an amalgamation of both movements in the years 1930 to 1936 were not successful.

In the 1970s, the Nordic countries placed pressure on the World Organization of the Scout Movement (WOSM) to expel the South African Movement for its racial policies. South African Scouting responded to this by combining all branches of the Movement into a single Boy Scouts of South Africa organisation at a conference known as Quo Vadis that was held on 2 July 1977.

Although apartheid laws forbade several forms of multiracial association, the South African government failed to take any action against the Movement on racial grounds.

Badge for Transkei Scouts during apartheid

Scouting was active during the period in several of the homelands, Transkei issuing Scout insignia and several including Bophuthatswana (the homeland where Mafikeng is located) issuing Scout-themed postage stamps.

On 10 July 1995, The Boy Scouts of South Africa adopted a new constitution and changed its name to the South African Scout Association, and also began accepting girls into its ranks. By 1999 girls were allowed in all sections. In 2008 the name changed to Scouts South Africa.

=== South African influences on World Scouting traditions ===
South Africa has long been associated with the origins of Scouting. Robert Baden-Powell, the founder of the movement, spent most of the years from 1884 to 1905 as a soldier in Southern Africa. South Africa's most prominent role in the origin of Scouting was the siege of Mafeking in 1899–1900. Baden-Powell successfully lead the defense of the town for 217 days. During the siege, he was inspired by the boys of the Mafeking Cadet Corps, and later used them as an example of bravery in the first chapter of his handbook Scouting for Boys. The Mafeking Cadets are not regarded as the first Boy Scouts, as Scouting was only born later, in 1907 at Brownsea Island in Britain. However, it was Mafeking that resulted in Baden-Powell becoming a national hero in Britain, and it was his fame that enabled his Scout movement to catch on so rapidly.

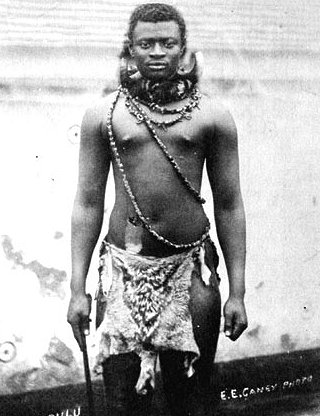
Photo of King Dinizulu wearing the necklace from which the original Wood Badge beads came

The Wood Badge, worn by adult Scout leaders, is a replica of beads from the necklace that was once worn by King Dinizulu of the Zulus. The original necklace was captured from Dinizulu by Baden-Powell. Other Zulu traditions and chants also featured in Scouting for Boys.

While serving in Southern Africa, Baden-Powell learnt many the skills that would become standard scouting skills. Jan Grootboom, a Xhosa from South Africa, was a military scout who Baden-Powell praised for his scouting ability in the Matabele Campaign. Baden-Powell also learnt scouting skills from Frederick Russell Burnham, an American explorer, adventurer, and mercenary, who went on to become a highly decorated Major and Chief of Scouts under Lord Roberts during the Second Boer War.

The earliest Scout uniform was based on the uniform that Robert Baden-Powell designed for the South African Constabulary, a paramilitary force established to police the conquered Boer republics following the Anglo-Boer War. The current South African Scout uniform is in fact still based on the uniform worn by the South African Constabulary.

Baden-Powell said of South Africa in 1926 that:

...none of the fellows in other countries know that the (Scout) flag (a golden fleur-de-lis on a green background) was started in South Africa. As you know the colours are those of the Transvaal and the Orange Free State. But those were also the colours of the South African Constabulary...and when I took to being a Scout, I took the colours with me. A good deal of our Scouting started in South Africa.

== Influence in South Africa ==
Scouts South Africa teaches young people the importance of high morals. Former South African President and patron of Scouts South Africa, Nelson Mandela, said the following of the Scout Movement:

The international Scout movement is a world leader in youth education, and has particular relevance to the needs of youth in Africa and the emerging democracies around the globe. I am pleased with the progress of Scouting in South Africa, and in the steps which are now being taken to make the programme accessible to more young people. The importance of a high moral code, which is at the foundation of the Scout movement, cannot be stressed too highly.

In 2013, various Troops in the Western Cape Region took part in the first ever Mandela Day Community Service Project on Robben Island, where former Patron Nelson Mandela was jailed for 18 of 27 years in prison. This Mandela Day project was repeated in 2014 and 2017.

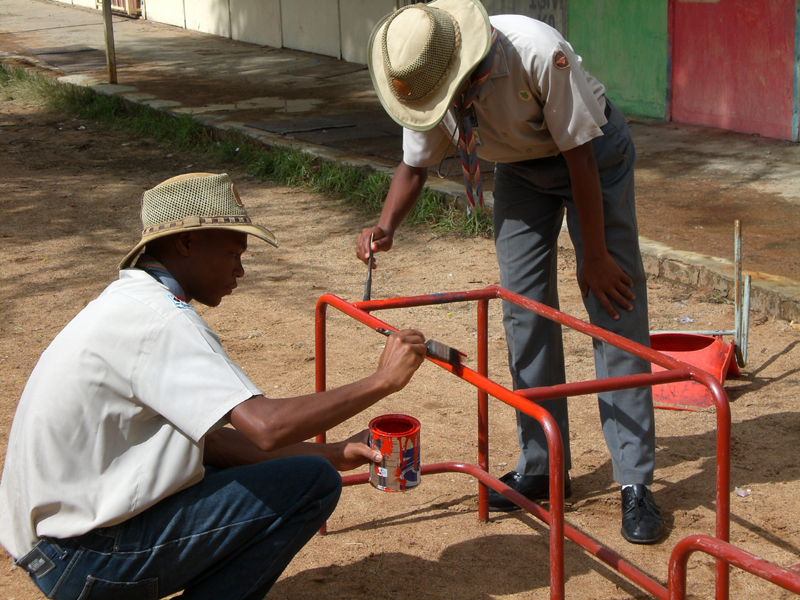
The Scouts in the Mpumalanga region in South Africa are co-ordinating projects of the German: "Aktion Tagwerk" and are supported as well by Aktion Tagwerk.

Scouts South Africa is actively involved in community work, particularly in the rural areas of South Africa. In some rural areas, such as the greater Tzaneen area, there are Troops with over 100 Scouts. Rural Troops are often limited in their activities by funding and lack of equipment. Their programme focuses on educating the Scouts in becoming good citizens and in the dangers of HIV. Educating Scouts in HIV and AIDS is vitally important due to the large number of infections in both rural and urban areas of South Africa.

== National organisation ==
Scouts South Africa is subdivided into Regions:

- Eastern Cape North
- Eastern Cape South
- Free State
- Gauteng
- KwaZulu-Natal
- Limpopo
- Mpumalanga
- North West
- Northern Cape
- Western Cape.

Each Province is in turn divided into Districts, and each District consists of a number of Groups. The national head office is in Cape Town.

The Chief Scout is the head of Scouts South Africa, and is therefore the leader of Scouting for all groups within South Africa. The current Chief Scout is Khonzaphi Mdaka, with effect from 1 February 2022, taking over from Dr. Brendon Hausberger. Former President of South Africa Nelson Mandela was the patron of Scouts South Africa until 2013.

=== Group organisation ===
A Scout Group consists of one or more units for different age groups: a Meerkat Den, Cub Pack, Scout Troop, and Rover Crew. Large Groups may have more than one of each section, or may have separate units for boys and girls. Rover Crews can also be associated with a District if independent from any one Scout Group within the District.

The Group is led by a Scout Group Leader (SGL) who acts as the liaison between the parents committee and the adult leaders of the Cub, Scout, and Rover units within the Group. The parents committee is an elected body of parents (with elections being held once a year at the Group AGM) that oversees the financial, maintenance, and legal affairs of the group, supporting the adult Scouters who run the programme for their branches.

== Meerkat programme ==
In 2019, a Meerkat branch was opened for ages 5 to 6.

== Cub programme ==
The Cub section is open to boys and girls between the ages of 7 and 11, and is intended to lay foundations and teach basic skills for when a Cub becomes a Scout. The Cub programme is based on a system of progressive leadership, with members being given increasing responsibility depending on age as they advance through the Cub Pack. Cubs are divided into small groups called Sixes led by a Sixer and a Second. The Pack Scouter may appoint the most responsible Cub in the Pack as a Senior Sixer.

The head of a Cub Pack is the Pack Scouter (PS), often nicknamed Akela after the head wolf in The Jungle Book by Rudyard Kipling. There may be a number of Assistant Pack Scouters, with nicknames from other Jungle Book characters. The Cub Advancement Programme is based on Cubs working towards the Silver Wolf and Gold Wolf badges, each divided into four Challenge Awards: Aptitude, Awareness, Outdoor, and Community; and the Leaping Wolf badge. Cubs proceeding to Scouts complete the Link Badge.

=== Cub Promise ===
I promise to do my best –
To do my duty to God and my country;
To keep the Law of the Wolf Cub Pack;
And to do a good turn to somebody every day.

=== Cub Law ===
The Cub gives in to the Old Wolf.
The Cub does not give in to himself / herself.

== Scout programme ==
The Scout section is open to boys and girls between the ages of 11 and 18, and aims at developing Scouting and leadership skills.

Scout Troops are divided into Patrols of between four and ten Scouts, with six being a common size. The Patrol Leader and Second have many responsibilities in training younger Scouts and helping plan and run the programme. Patrol Leaders are in charge of planning and running (often with no adult intervention) Patrol camps and outings, and are also required to assist their Patrol members through the Scout advancement program.

Often the most senior and responsible Patrol Leader is appointed as Troop Leader (TL), who no longer runs a Patrol but instead has other responsibilities such as enforcing discipline and running the weekly programme. Since a Troop Leader is not required to plan or run Patrol camps, or help Scouts through the advancement program many senior Scouts who are in their final year of school choose to become Troop Leaders to have more time to concentrate on their studies and on achieving the Springbok award.

The adult leader of a Scout Troop is the Troop Scouter (TS), assisted by Assistant Troop Scouters (ATS) and Junior Assistant Troop Scouters (JATS).

=== Scout Promise ===
On my honour, I promise that I will do my best –
To do my duty to God, and my Country;
To help other people at all times;
To obey the Scout Law.

=== Scout Law ===
1. A Scout's honour is to be trusted
2. A Scout is loyal
3. A Scout's duty is to be useful and to help others.
4. A Scout is a friend to all and a brother / sister to every other Scout
5. A Scout is courteous
6. A Scout is a friend to animals
7. A Scout obeys orders
8. A Scout smiles and whistles under all difficulties
9. A Scout is thrifty
10. A Scout is clean in thought, word and deed

=== Advancement badges ===
The Scout Advancement Programme is based on a number of advancement badges, culminating in the Springbok Scout badge. Each advancement badge focuses on different levels of development and the programme progresses from basic Scout training, to training young Scouts, and ends with a focus on community service.

Troop Membership
To be invested as a Scout, the membership requirements for recruits include knowing the basic story behind Scouting, the Scout Promise and Law, some basic Scouting skills, and the National anthem of South Africa.

Traveller
This advancement badge focuses on basic Scout training, including the six basic knots (Reef Knot, Bowline, Sheet bend, Sheepshank, Round turn and two half hitches, and Clove hitch), basic first aid (treatment of open wounds and bleeding), and introduces Scouts to camping. The badge encourages a Scout to participate in patrol activities. The Scout is required to have camped away from their normal Scout meeting place for at least three nights.

Discoverer
This advancement badge introduces the Scout to basic pioneering, including whipping, basic lashing, and other advanced knots. The Scout is required to know more advanced forms of first aid (treatment of shock, sprains, and fainting). The Scout needs to help plan, and be second in charge of a patrol hike. Other requirements for the badge include knowledge of HIV/AIDS and knowledge of how a Court of Honour functions.

First Class
This advancement badge is the first advancement badge that places the Scout in a position of leadership and organisation. A Scout is required to plan and run a wide game for their Patrol, a Patrol camp, an overnight Patrol hike for which a log book must be written, a programme to teach younger Scouts in their Patrol about pioneering, and they need to assist in the planning of a Scouts' Own.
The Scout also needs to lead their patrol in a community service project of not less than ten hours.

Springbok Scout badge

Springbok
This badge is the top Scout award in South Africa. It concentrates on teaching the Scout how to give back to the community. The Springbok award is the equivalent of the UK's King's Scout and the American Eagle Scout. Among the requirements, the Scout must complete at least 40 hours of community service, lead a hike of over 30 kilometres (18.6 mi) in unfamiliar territory, and plan and construct a pioneering project.

== Court of Honour ==
The Court of Honour is a regular meeting of Patrol Leaders (PLs) and the Troop Scouter, and is responsible for the majority of decisions regarding troop discipline, patrol management, troop programme and other matters. The Troop Scouter is the only adult leader regularly attending these meetings, although the Court of Honour may invite other Scouters to attend. The Troop Scouter has the right to veto decision, but should generally only act in an advisory role, allowing the Scouts themselves to make important decisions.

== Air Scouting ==
Air Scouting in South Africa is an active part of the program. Since 2005 Air Scouting has expanded, especially in Gauteng, where the first Airjamborally since the 1980s was held during August 2005. The Gauteng region has 5 of the 8 Air Scout Groups.

The Air Scout uniform is a sky blue shirt (Short sleeve), Navy blue long pants or shorts, black socks, black shoes, the group scarf and a black beret. Air Scout badges are Advanced Navigation, Air Glider, Air Mechanic, Air Meteorologist, Air Navigator, Air Spotter and Air Traffic Controller. Challenge awards differ from Land and Sea Scouts. Whereas Land Scouts can obtain a Bushman's Thong and Sea Scouts the Bosun's cord, Air Scouts wear The Airman's Cord.

== Rover programme ==
The Rover section is open to any young adults between the ages of 18 and 30. The Rover programme focuses on their motto of 'Service', which has 3 aspects – service to the community, service to the Scout Movement and service to oneself. Rovers are not necessarily adult leaders of Scout Troops, although there is often some overlap. The Rover section has historically been open to young men and women, even prior to the Cub and Scout sections being opened to girls.

The purpose of Rover Scouting is to encourage Rovers to train themselves and their fellow Rovers in citizenship and service, to encourage Rovers to pursue careers that they enjoy and that are useful to themselves and to render services to both the Scout Movement and the community around them.

Within three months of joining a Rover Crew a newcomer may be invested as a Squire. Alternatively, a Scout wishing to join the Rover Crew upon their 18th birthday, may complete the Rover Network Badge. Newcomers, not previously a Scout, must first be invested as a Scout and must take the Scout Promise. The Squire then chooses a mentor, called a Sponsor, from one of the existing Rovers; the Sponsor's task is to guide the Squire in learning all the necessary Scouting skills and to aid the Squire in performing a service project as set out by the Rover Crew. Once the service project is completed the Squire can be invested as a fully fledged Rover.

=== Rover badges ===
==== Rover advancement badges ====
Rovers are able to take part in a 5-part advancement, similar to that of Scouts. Each rank of advancement focuses on a different stage of the development of a young adult, and on a different part of a Rovers service. The advancement awards are:

- The Personal Bar – Focusing on skills a young adult may need to develop, such as writing a CV or learning about investing.
- The Movement Bar – Focus is on service to Scouting, and Rovers are requires to learn practical outdoor skills and use these skills to help youth activities.
- The Community Bar – A Rover is required to get involved in their local community, research needs and develop projects to fulfill these.
- The Leadership Bar – A more senior Rover can use the skills they have gained by this point to guide younger Rovers and take a leadership role in the Crew.
- The Baden-Powell Award – The highest award a Rover can attain. Requires the completion of all previous bars, 4 Rover Awards and a challenge award.

==== Rover awards ====
Rovers can earn eleven different awards:

- The Careers Award
- The Civics Award
- The Community Service Award
- The Rambler's Award
- The Scoutcraft Award
- The Scouter Training Award
- The Sportsmanship Award
- The Project Award
- The Public Health Award
- The Emergency Service Award
- The Arts and Culture Award

Challenge Awards

Rovers must earn at least one "Challenge Award" in order to achieve the Baden-Powell Award. These are awards in recognition of activity done outside of the advancement programme. Various awards are recognised for this purpose, including awards administered by SCOUTS South Africa, international awards administered by WOSM, and external awards administered by independent organisations.

== Events ==
In addition to activities run by individual Scout groups, a large number of rallies, activities, competitions, and training courses are held by the different Regions. The biggest of these are probably the Kon-Tiki raft building competitions (held annually in Cape Town and Gauteng) and the JOTA-JOTI communications-focussed Jamboree. Nationally, the Senior Scout Adventure is held every two years in the Cederberg mountains. In the past, South Africa has also held a national Jamboree, known as SANJAMB.

=== Patrol Leaders Training Unit ===
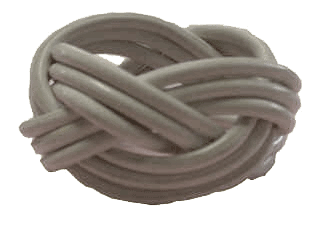
Lexden Woggle worn by PLTU attendees. The woggle is a five-Turk's head knot with three strands, and is usually made from white plastic insulated wire.

The Patrol Leaders Training Unit (or PLTU) is a 7- to 12-day course run at various venues around South Africa. PLTU is a very physically and mentally strenuous course, open to Scouts who are over 14½ years old and have achieved their Discoverer advancement badge.

The first of what was to become the Patrol Leader training Unit courses was run at Lexden — Natal Gilwell Scout Training Camp in July 1959, under the leadership of Dudley Forde, with 19 Scouts from the 2nd Durban Y.M.C.A. Scout Group in attendance. Courses were offered to boys from the same Group over the next five years until the 6th Course in October 1964 which was opened to participants from South Durban District.

In October 1967 the Patrol Leader Training Unit was formed to offer formal Leadership Training courses for Scout Patrol Leaders in the then Natal Division. The nine members comprising the original Unit were Dudley Forde [Chairman], Fr Ian Laurenson, Lynn Reynolds, Paddy McDowell, Paul and Helen Bezencon, Ian Hoare, Tony Hornby and Bill Sewell. The KwaZulu-Natal Patrol Leader training Unit celebrated the holding of its 100th course in July 2004. Dudley Forde, Fr Ian Laurenson, James Radford, Doug Drysdale, Bryan Dibben, Craig Shaw, Grant Martens and Guy Caws have led the PLTU over its first 45 years.

This Unit hosted and mentored leaders who went on to create Patrol Leader Training Units in other centres in South Africa: Ian Hoare — East London, Derek Swemmer — Pretoria, Lynn Reynolds — Free State, Bill Hodges and Bruce Maree — Eastern Cape, Ian Harry and Chris Barrett — Gauteng, Peter Foster — Western Cape.

A typical PLTU course focuses on character development in each individual, including the development of physical, mental and spiritual qualities. Qualities such as leadership and team spirit are instilled in the Scouts during the course. There are a number of PLTU courses on offer around South Africa

- Gilten PLTU — Held in Johannesburg
- Gilqua PLTU — Held in the Western Cape
- Weston PLTU — Held in Johannesburg
- Lexden PLTU — The original PLTU course held in KwaZulu-Natal
- Gilcoast PLTU — Held in the Eastern Cape
- Gilkloof PLTU — Held in Magoebaskloof

On the successful completion of a PLTU course a Scout is entitled to wear a PLTU woggle (which is made by the Scout while on the course) and to wear a special PLTU badge on their uniform. Many Troops also require a Scout to complete a PLTU course before allowing them to become a Patrol Leader.

== International links ==
Scouts South Africa plays an active role in the Southern Africa Zone, which consists of all the WOSM member Scout Associations in the Southern Africa region. The Africa Scout Region has a satellite office in Cape Town at the Scouts South Africa headquarters. A number of European Scout Associations are also involved in north–south partnerships with Scouts in developing countries, including several active programmes in South Africa. Members of the Boy Scouts of America living in South Africa may become Lone Scouts linked to the Direct Service branch of the BSA.

=== Contributions to World Scouting ===
The Join-In Jamboree concept, for Scouts in their home countries during World Scout Jamborees, was pioneered by the South African Vic Clapham in the 1970s. Vic Clapham was awarded the Bronze Wolf, the only distinction of the World Organization of the Scout Movement, by the World Scout Committee for exceptional services to world Scouting. In 1971, former Chief Scout Arthur H. Johnstone was also awarded the Bronze Wolf. Colin Inglis and Garnet de la Hunt, both former Chief Scouts of South Africa, were awarded the Bronze Wolf in 1996 for their work towards racial unity in Scouting during the apartheid era. Winston Adams of South Africa received the Bronze Wolf in 2017.

Frank Opie, a South African Scout leader and environmental educationalist, published The Global Scout on behalf of World Scouting in 1993. The South African Scout Association hosted the World Scout Conference and World Scout Youth Forum in Durban in 1999. Garnet de la Hunt chaired the World Scout Committee from 1999 to 2002, and former Chief Scout Nkwenkwe Nkomo was elected to the World Scout Committee in 2005.

== See also ==
- Lesotho Scouts Association
- Scouts of Namibia
- Eswatini Scout Association
- Voortrekkers
- Girl Guides South Africa
