= World's View =

World's View may refer to:

- World's View, Nyanga, viewpoint in the Eastern Highlands of Zimbabwe
- World's View, Pietermaritzburg, heritage site near Pietermaritzburg.
- Malindidzimu, summit in Matobo National Park, Zimbabwe, also known as "World's View"
