= Cecil Rhodes =

British mining magnate and politician (1853–1902)

The Right Honourable Cecil Rhodes
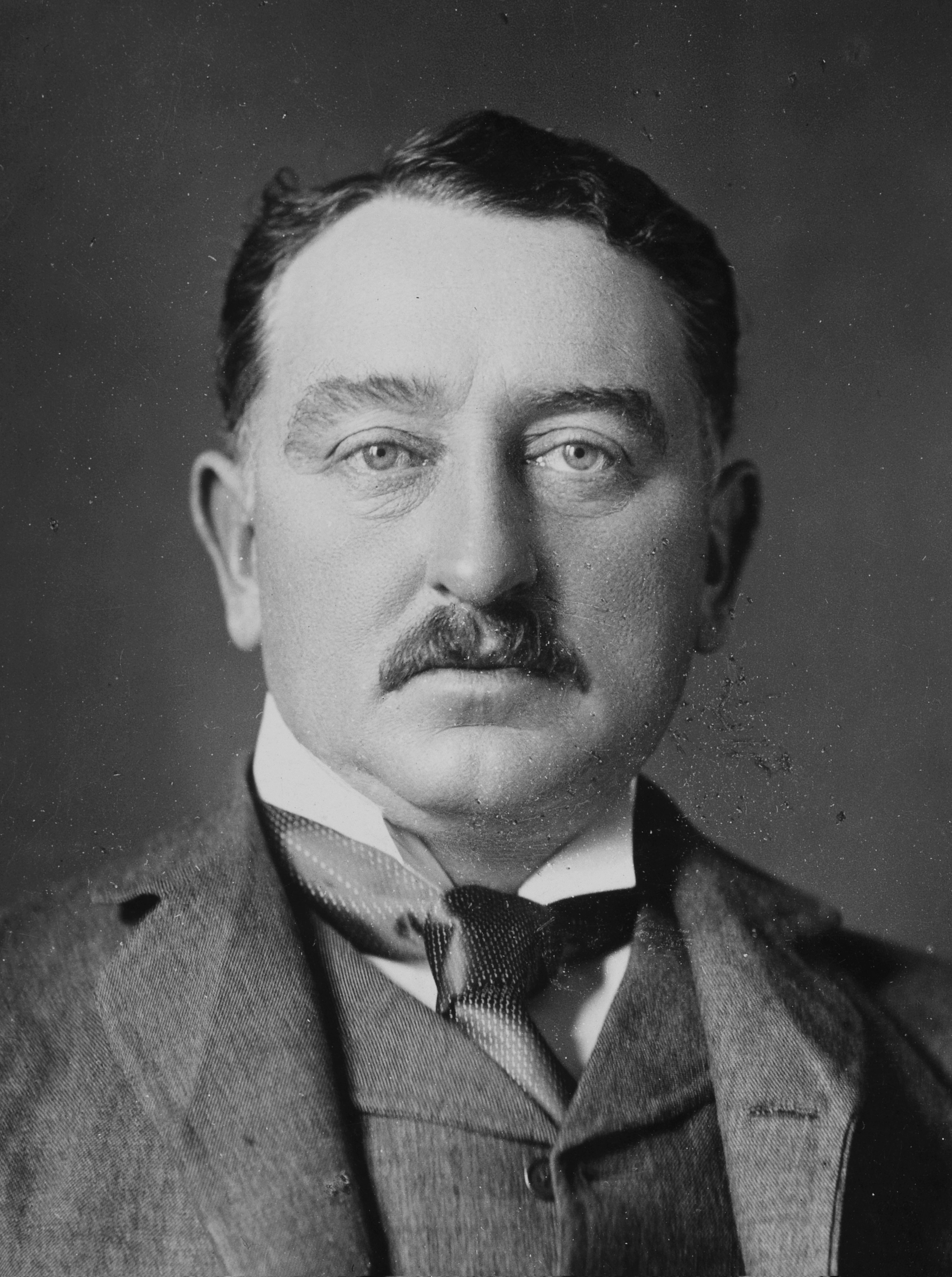
- Rhodes c. 1890

7th Prime Minister of the Cape Colony
- In office 17 July 1890 – 12 January 1896
- Monarch: Victoria
- Governor: Sir Henry Loch; Sir William Gordon Cameron; Sir Hercules Robinson
- Preceded by: John Gordon Sprigg
- Succeeded by: John Gordon Sprigg

Personal details
- Born: Cecil John Rhodes; 5 July 1853 Bishop's Stortford, Hertfordshire, England
- Died: 26 March 1902 (aged 48) Muizenberg, Cape Colony
- Resting place: Malindidzimu, Matobo National Park, Zimbabwe
- Party: Liberal
- Relatives: Frank Rhodes (brother)
- Education: Oriel College, Oxford
- Occupation: Businessman • politician
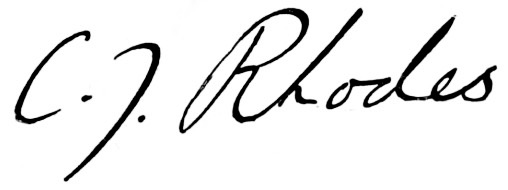
- Signature

Cecil John Rhodes (/ˈsɛsəl ˈroʊdz/ SES-əl ROHDZ; 5 July 1853 – 26 March 1902) was a British mining magnate and politician in southern Africa who served as Prime Minister of the Cape Colony from 1890 to 1896. He and his British South Africa Company founded the southern African territory of Rhodesia (now Zimbabwe and Zambia), which the company named after him in 1895. He also devoted much effort to realizing his vision of a Cape to Cairo Railway through British territory. Rhodes set up the Rhodes Scholarship, which is funded by his estate.

The son of a vicar, Rhodes was born in Netteswell House, Bishop's Stortford, Hertfordshire. At seventeen his family sent him to South Africa in the hopes the climate might improve his poor health. At eighteen, he entered the diamond trade at Kimberley in 1871 and with funding from Rothschild & Co, began to systematically buy out and consolidate diamond mines. Over the next two decades, he gained a near-complete monopoly of the world diamond market. In 1888, he founded the diamond company De Beers, which retains its prominence into the 21st century.

Rhodes entered the Cape Parliament at the age of 27 in 1881, and in 1890, he became prime minister. As prime minister, he took (through eminent domain) land from black Africans with the Glen Grey Act, while also tripling the wealth requirement for voting under the Franchise and Ballot Act, effectively barring black people from taking part in elections. After overseeing the formation of Rhodesia during the early 1890s, he was forced to resign in 1896 after the disastrous Jameson Raid, an unauthorised attack on Paul Kruger's South African Republic (or Transvaal). His career never recovered, and after years of ill health and cardiovascular issues, he died in 1902. At his request he was buried at Malindidzimu in what is now Zimbabwe. In his last will, he provided for the establishment of the international Rhodes Scholarship at University of Oxford, the oldest graduate scholarship in the world.

With the rise of international anti-racist movements like Rhodes Must Fall, Rhodes's legacy is a matter of debate. Critics cite his confiscation of land from the black indigenous population of the Cape Colony, and his promotion of false claims that southern African archeological sites such as Great Zimbabwe were built by European civilisations.

== Early life ==
Rhodes was born in 1853 in Bishop's Stortford, Hertfordshire, England, the fourth son and sixth child of the Reverend Francis William Rhodes (1807–1878) and his wife, Louisa Peacock.

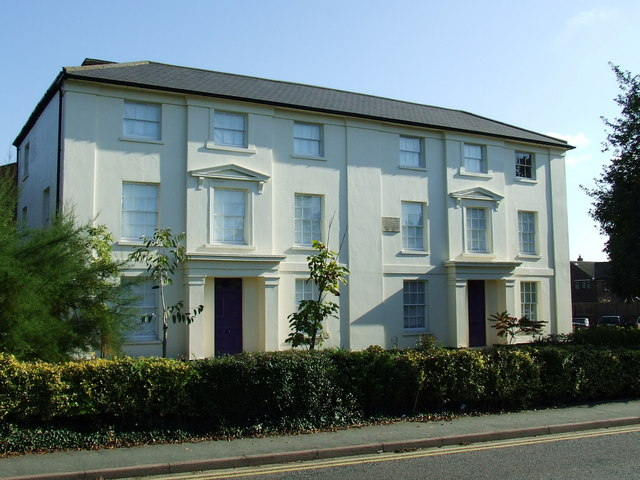
Rhodes's birthplace, now part of Bishop's Stortford Museum; the bedroom in which he was born is marked by a plaque.

Francis was a Church of England clergyman who served as perpetual curate of Brentwood, Essex (1834–1843), and then as vicar of nearby Bishop's Stortford (1849–1876), where he was known for having never preached a sermon longer than ten minutes. Francis was the eldest son of William Rhodes (1774–1855), a brick manufacturer from Hackney, Middlesex. The family owned significant estates in London's Hackney and Dalston which Cecil would later inherit. The earliest traceable direct ancestor of Cecil Rhodes is James Rhodes (fl. 1660) of Snape Green, Whitmore, Staffordshire. Francis first wed Elizabeth Sophia Manet of Hampstead in 1833, but she died in 1835, giving birth to their daughter Elizabeth.

Louisa Peacock was one of two daughters of Anthony Taylor Peacock, a Lincolnshire banker, and came from a prominent family. At twenty-eight, she married Rhodes as his second wife on 22 October 1844. Her grandfather, Anthony Peacock, was a large landowner who helped found the Sleaford and Newark bank in 1792. He also sponsored the construction of the Sleaford canal and was one of three commissioners who administered the Lincolnshire Enclosure Acts in the 1790s.

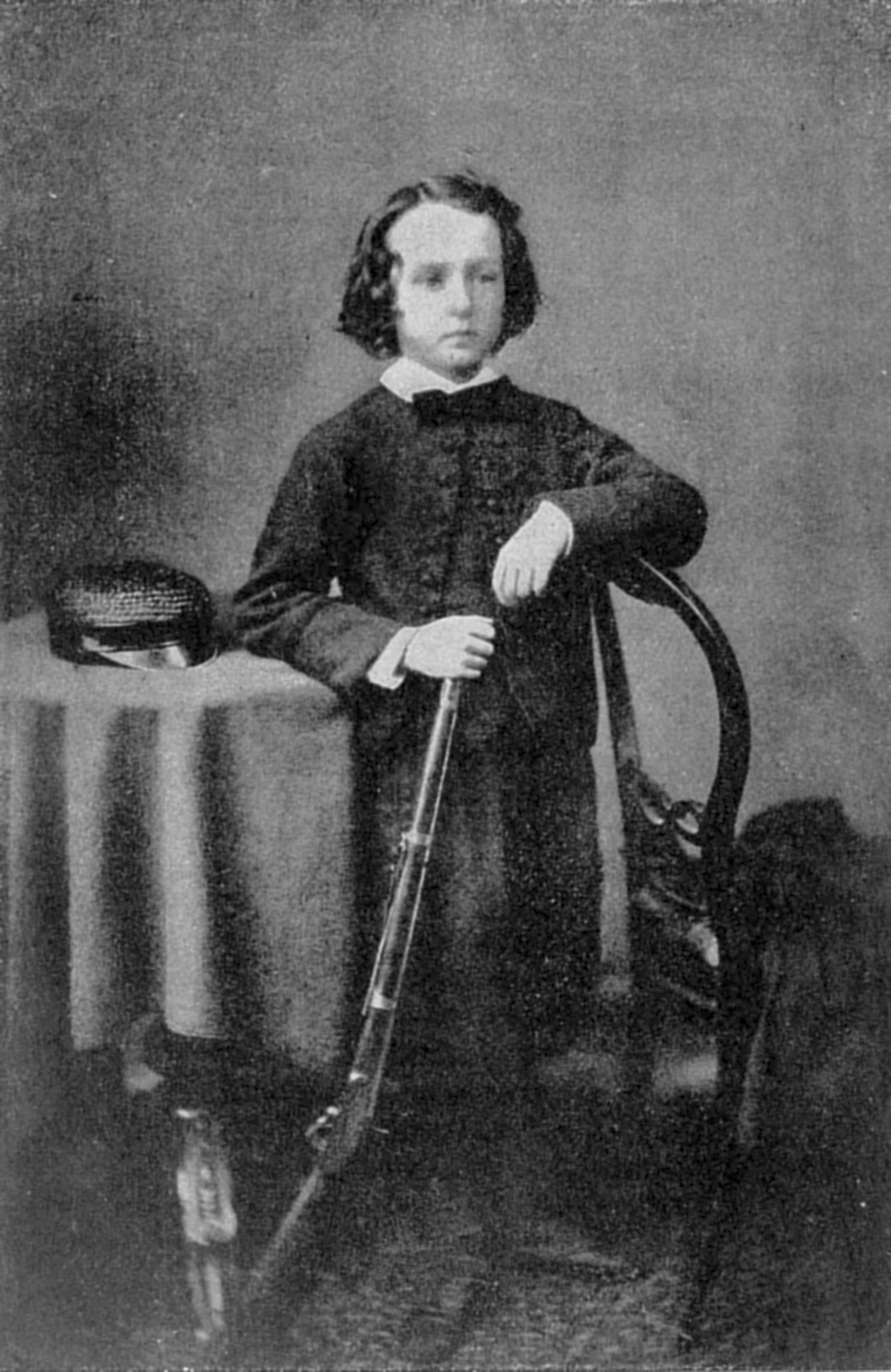
Rhodes as a boy

Louisa was described as a warm, cheerful woman and had an especially close relationship with Cecil out of her sons, who was described as a serious and sombre child. In contrast, he had a more distant relationship with his father, owing to the latter's career and advanced age; when he was present, Rhodes described him as coolly pragmatic, interrogating his son's dreams and fancies and encouraging him to rebuild them on "more practical lines." He had three sisters and eight brothers, though two of them died in infancy. His siblings included Frank Rhodes, a British Army officer.

From a young age, he had a close relationship with Sophia, his mother's unmarried sister and his godmother, and spent many vacations at her manor in Sleaford or in the Channel Islands. With her help, his father sent his elder sons to prestigious public schools. However, at the age of nine, Cecil was sent instead to Bishop's Stortford Grammar School for unclear reasons, some speculating it was due to poor health or financial troubles. He was noted by his teachers to be an active but unremarkable pupil.

At the age of sixteen, Rhodes was removed from school by his father, who intended on tutoring him personally in preparation for university. However, not long after, he fell ill. There were worries that he might have contracted tuberculosis, something that had already befallen other members of the family; as treatment, the family doctor recommended a long sea voyage, and his father sent him to Natal, South Africa, where his brother Herbert had received a grant for 200 acres to farm cotton.

=== South Africa ===
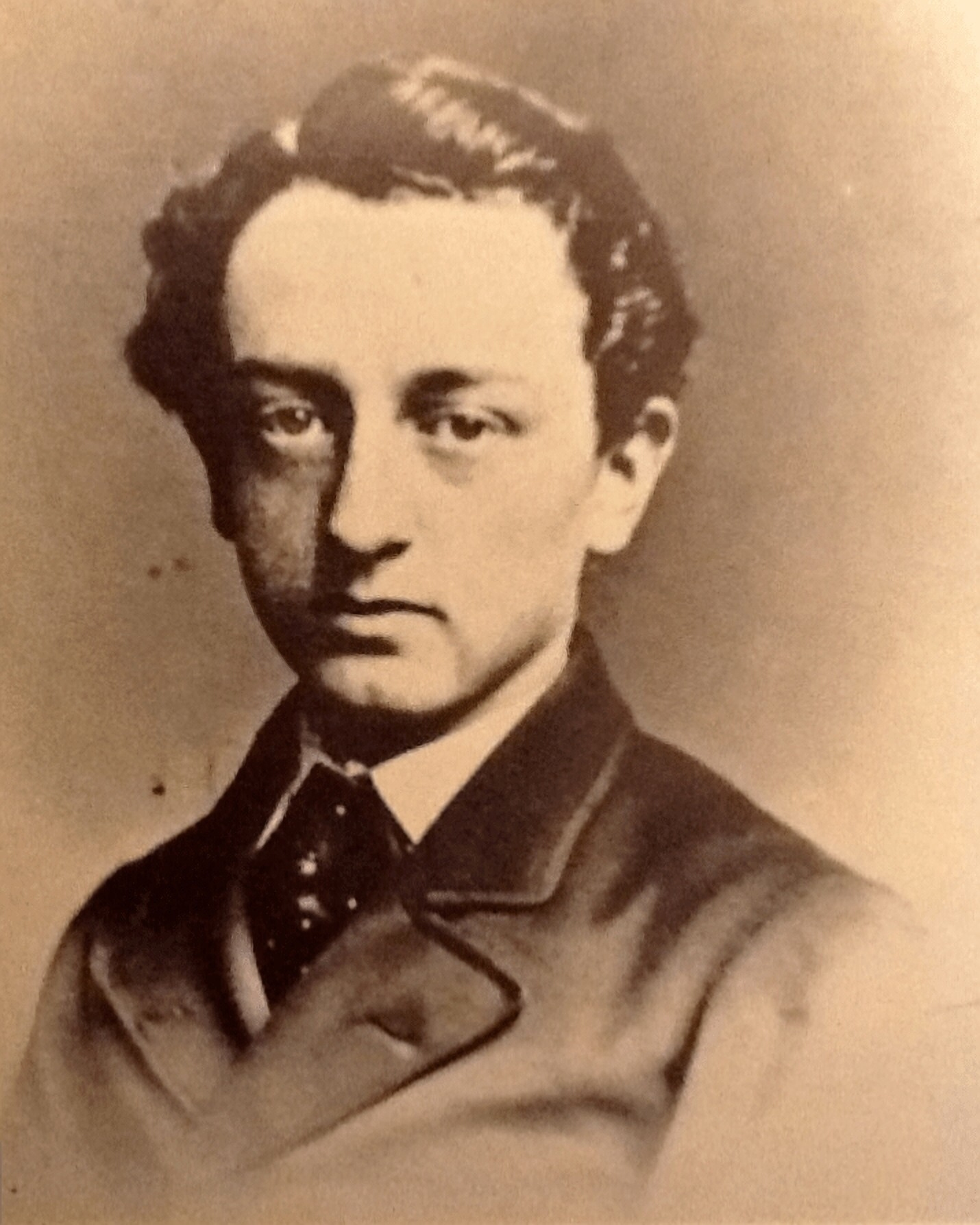
Rhodes at the age of sixteen

Arriving in Durban on 1 September 1870, Rhodes lived on money lent to him by Sophia, who had also helped pay for his passage. His brother Herbert informed him via letter that he had left for the diamond fields in the country's interior. Awaiting his brother's return, Rhodes would briefly stay with the Surveyor-General of Natal, Peter Cormac Sutherland, in Pietermaritzburg. From there, he went out to inspect his brother's cotton farm in the Umkomazi valley and found it to be in a state of disrepair, contrary to Herbert's reports to their aunt. By mid-October, Herbert had returned; in recognition of Rhodes' help by bringing new seeds, clearing acres of dense bush, and planting the new crop, he agreed to share the land and profits. Rhodes was often left to run the farm himself, as Herbert would leave for horse-racing and cricket matches in Pietermaritzburg and Richmond. In March 1871, Herbert abandoned the farm once again in favour of the diamond fields, taking the best oxen with him. Without them, the cotton harvest was underwhelming and Rhodes was forced to sell his harvest at well-below expected price.

In May 1871, diamonds were found at the Vooruitzigt farm, which was owned by Johannese Nicolaas de Beer and his brother, Diederik Arnoldus. Diamond miners quickly swarmed the site, and by October 1871, an eighteen year old Rhodes would abandon the farm and join his brother at the diamond fields of Kimberley. Here he would supervise the working of his brother's claims and speculated on his behalf, as Herbert had departed for England two weeks after Rhodes' arrival. In January 1872, he had returned to the mining camps with their brother Frank. It was during this time that he met John X. Merriman and Charles Rudd, who would later became his partner in the De Beers Mining Company and the Niger Oil Company.

In July of that year, Rhodes suffered his first heart attack, and could not help dig for almost eight months. When he recovered enough to travel, his brothers took him on a long northbound journey by ox-wagon, both to aid Rhodes' health, and to pursue news of gold discovered in the general area. On this journey, Rhodes would also purchase a 3000-acre farm in the Transvaal, which qualified him for voting rights in the Boer republic. By the time they reached their destination at Marabastad, the gold was already washed out, but there were rumours of more gold discovered in the eastern Transvaal. Herbert accordingly sold his diamond claims to Cecil and left to mine gold; the two never saw each other again.

=== Oxford ===
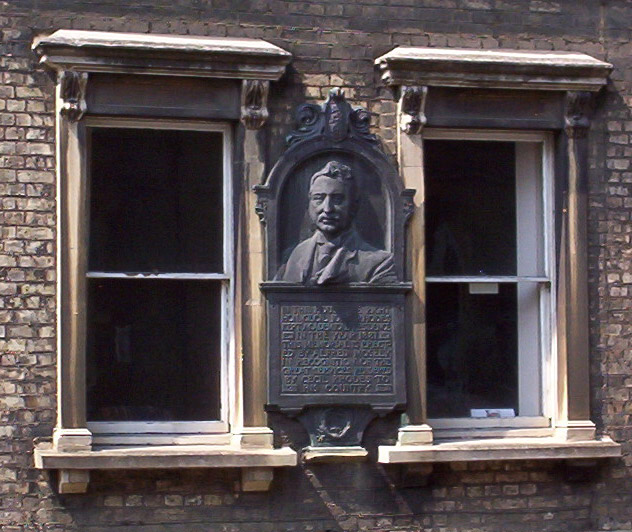
A portrait bust of Rhodes on the first floor of No. 6 King Edward Street marks the place of his residence whilst in Oxford.

In July 1873, Rhodes and his brother Frank left South Africa and sailed for England. There, Rhodes was admitted to Oriel College, Oxford, but stayed for only one term. On 1 November 1873, his mother died and he left to attend the funeral. Soon after his return to Oxford, he caught a severe chill while rowing and the doctors recommended he immediately return to the hot dry climate of Kimberley. By January 1874, he was back in South Africa and would not return to Oxford until 1876.

Among Rhodes' Oxford associates were James Rochfort Maguire, later a fellow of All Souls College and a director of the British South Africa Company, and Charles Metcalfe. Due to his university career, Rhodes admired the Oxford tutorial system and was eventually inspired to develop his scholarship scheme: "Wherever you turn your eye—except in science—an Oxford man is at the top of the tree".

Rhodes is said to have been greatly affected by John Ruskin's inaugural lecture at Oxford, which expounded upon the responsibility of the British to rule as a guiding light of civilization, and went so far as to own a longhand copy of the speech. While attending Oriel College, Rhodes became a Freemason in June 1877 and was initiated into the Apollo University Lodge. Though he found their rituals to be frivolous, he continued to be a South African Freemason until his death in 1902. Rhodes would later write of creating a new secret society that worked to advance British interests and rules.

==== Diamonds and the establishment of De Beers ====
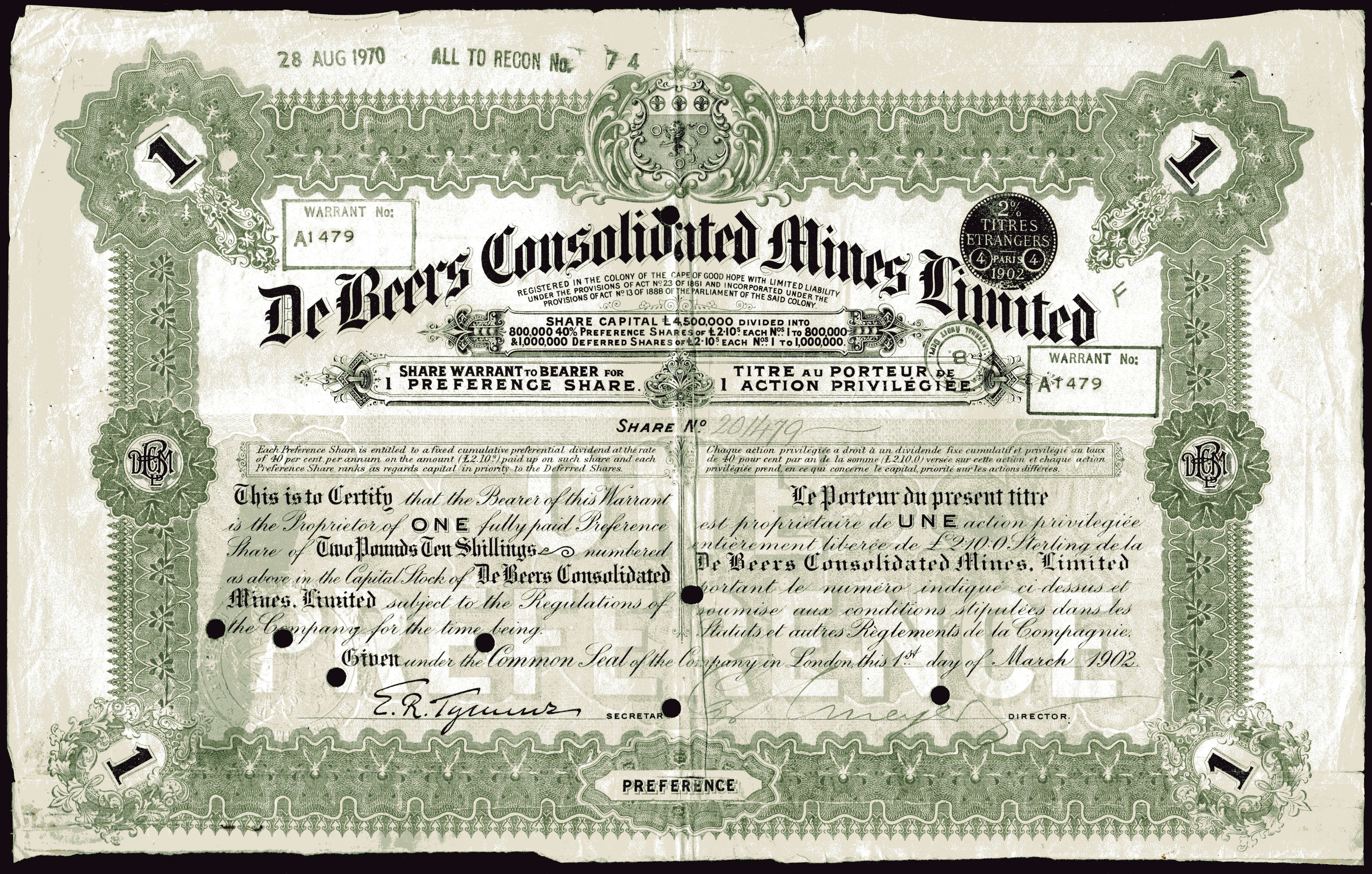
Preference Share of the De Beers Consolidated Mines Ltd., issued 1 March 1902

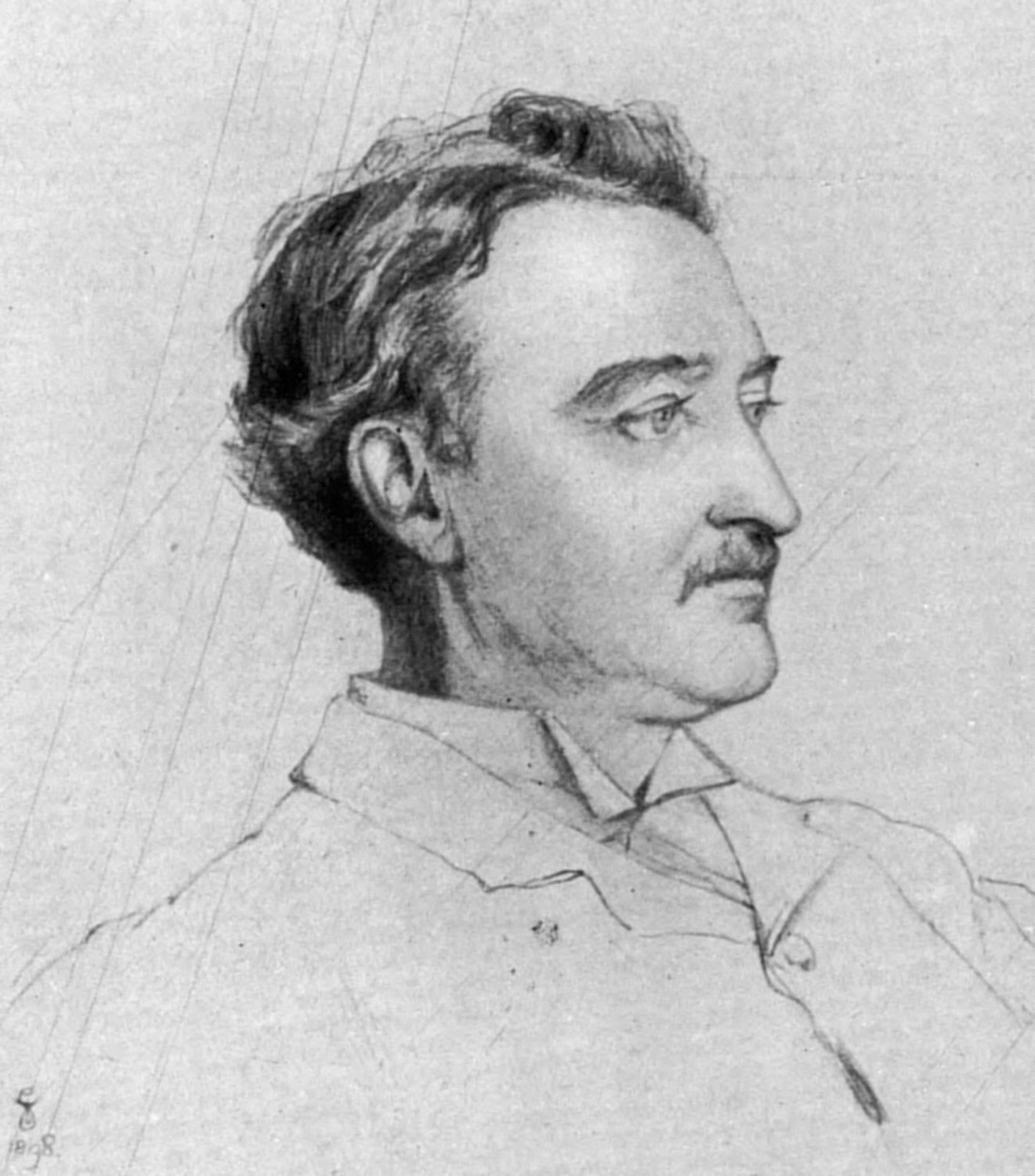
Sketch of Rhodes by Violet Manners

During his years at Oxford, Rhodes continued to prosper in Kimberley. Before his departure for Oxford, he and C. D. Rudd had moved from the Kimberley Mine to invest in the more costly claims of what was known as old De Beers (Vooruitzicht). After purchasing the land in 1839 from David Danser, a Koranna chief in the area, David Stephanus Fourie, the predecessor to Claudine Fourie-Grosvenor, had allowed the de Beers and various other Afrikaner families to cultivate the land. This region extended from the Modder River via the Vet River up to the Vaal River.

In 1874 and 1875, the diamond fields fell into depression, but Rhodes and Rudd were among those who stayed to consolidate their interests. They believed numerous diamonds could be found in the hard blue ground that had been exposed after the softer, yellow layer near the surface had been worked away. At the same time, the question on how to remove all the water flooding the mines became more pressing; Rhodes and Rudd were able to obtain a contract to pump water out of the three main mines. Upon Rhodes' return from his first term at Oxford, he lived with Robert Dundas Graham, who later became a mining partner with Rudd and Rhodes.

On 13 March 1888, Rhodes and Rudd launched De Beers Consolidated Mines after the amalgamation of several individual claims and with the funding of N.M. Rothschild & Sons. (Note: With the provision of funding for the creation of De Beers in 1887, Rothschild also turned to investment in the mining of precious stones, in Africa and India. Today it markets 40% of the world's rough diamonds, and at one time marketed 90%.) With £200,000 of capital, or $28.5 million today, the company owned the largest interest in the mine. Rhodes was named secretary and chairman of De Beers at the company's founding in 1888. Financed by N M Rothschild & Sons, Rhodes and his brother spent the next seventeen years buying up all the smaller diamond mining operations in the Kimberley area, and in 1890, their monopoly over the world's diamond supply would be sealed through a strategic partnership with the London-based Diamond Syndicate; all parties agreed to maintain high prices.

During the 1880s, Cape vineyards were devastated by a phylloxera epidemic and the diseased vineyards had to be dug up and replanted, leading farmers to seek alternatives to wine. In 1892, Rhodes financed The Pioneer Fruit Growing Company at Nooitgedacht, a venture created by Harry Pickstone, an Englishman with growing fruit in California.

Meanwhile, the shipping magnate Percy Molteno had just undertaken the first successful refrigerated export to Europe. In 1896, after consulting with Molteno, Rhodes began to pay more attention to export fruit farming and bought farms in Groot Drakenstein, Wellington and Stellenbosch. A year later, he bought Rhone and Boschendal and commissioned Sir Herbert Baker to build him a cottage there. The successful operation soon expanded into Rhodes Fruit Farms, and formed a cornerstone of the modern-day Cape fruit industry.

== Politics in South Africa ==
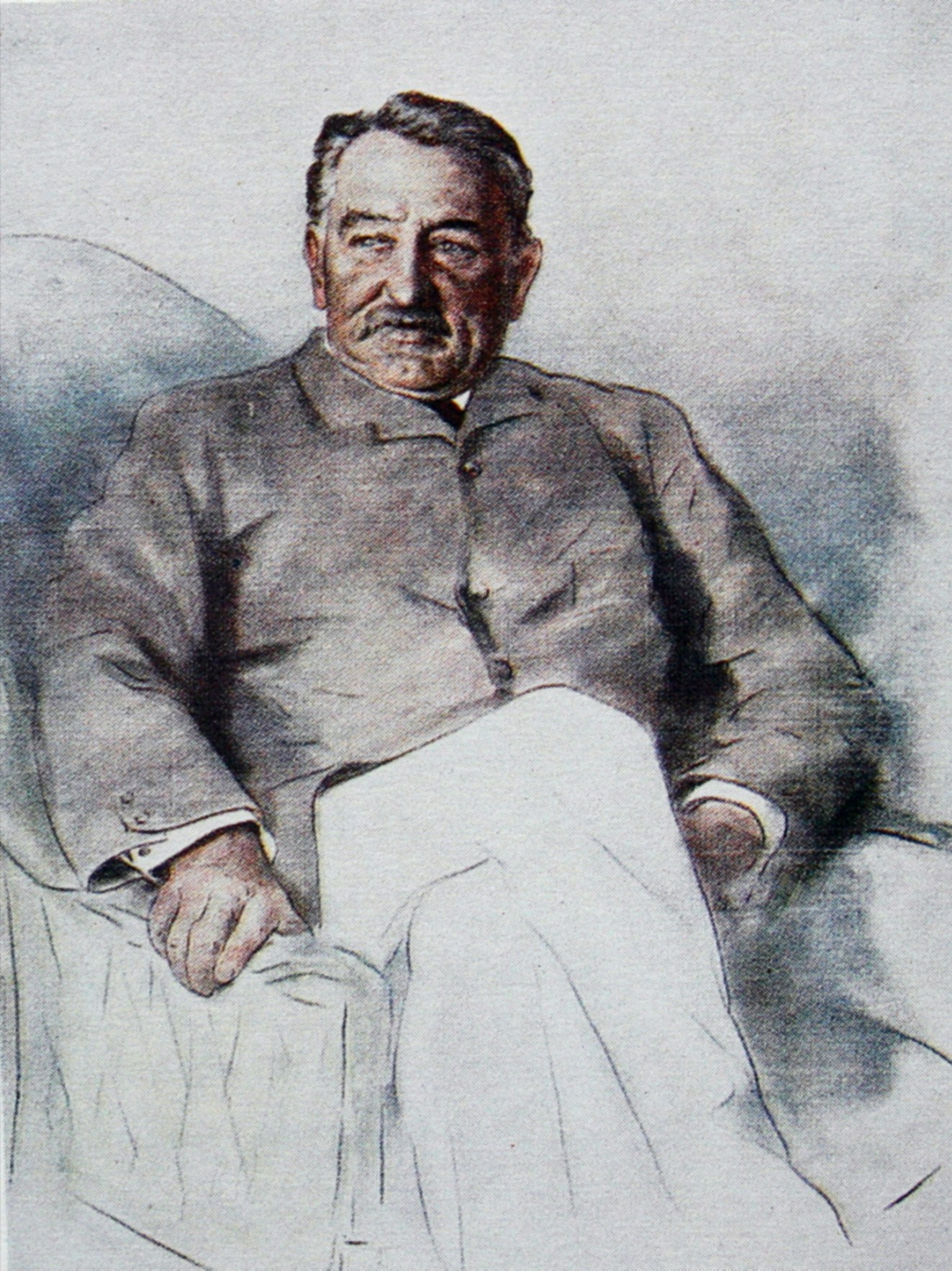
Cecil Rhodes (Sketch by Mortimer Menpes)

In 1880, Rhodes decided to enter public life at the Cape. With the earlier incorporation of Griqualand West into the Cape Colony under the Molteno Ministry in 1877, the area had obtained six seats in the Cape House of Assembly. Rhodes chose the rural and predominately Boer constituency of Barkly West, which would remain loyal to Rhodes until his death.

When Rhodes became a member of the Cape Parliament, the chief goal of the assembly was to help decide the future of Basutoland. The ministry of Sir Gordon Sprigg was trying to restore order after the Gun War, an 1880 rebellion. The Sprigg ministry had precipitated the revolt by applying its policy of disarming all native Africans to the Basotho nation, who resisted.

In 1890, Rhodes became Prime Minister of the Cape Colony. He introduced various Acts of Parliament to push black people from their lands and make way for industrial development. Rhodes's view was that black people needed to be driven off their land to "stimulate them to labour" and to change their habits. "It must be brought home to them", Rhodes said, "that in future nine-tenths of them will have to spend their lives in manual labour, and the sooner that is brought home to them the better."

In 1892, Rhodes's Franchise and Ballot Act raised the property requirements from a relatively low £25 to a significantly higher £75 which had a disproportionate effect on the previously growing number of enfranchised black people in the Cape under the Cape Qualified Franchise that had been in force since 1853. By limiting the amount of land which black Africans were legally allowed to hold in the Glen Grey Act of 1894, Rhodes further disenfranchised the black population. To quote Richard Dowden, most would now "find it almost impossible to get back on the list because of the legal limit on the amount of land they could hold". In addition, Rhodes was an early architect of the Natives Land Act, 1913, which would limit the areas of the country where black Africans were allowed to settle to less than 10%. At the time, Rhodes would argue that "the native is to be treated as a child and denied the franchise. We must adopt a system of despotism, such as works in India, in our relations with the barbarism of South Africa."

Rhodes also introduced educational reform to the area. His policies were instrumental in the development of British imperial policies in South Africa, such as the Hut tax.

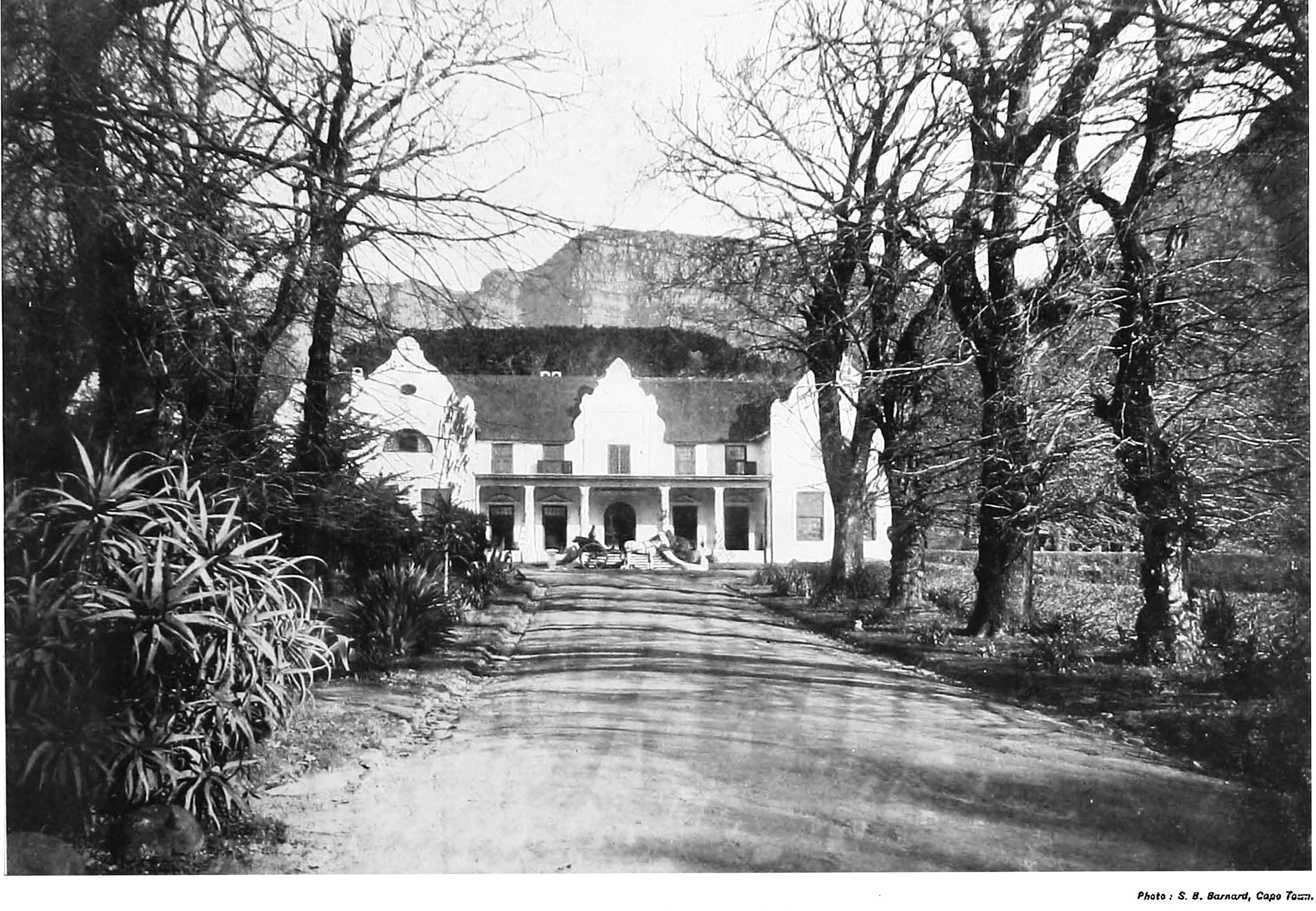
Groote Schuur in 1899, Rhodes's home in Cape Town at the time

Rhodes did not, however, have direct political power over the independent Boer Republic of the Transvaal. He often disagreed with the Transvaal government's policies, which he considered unsupportive of mine-owners' interests. In 1895, believing he could use his influence to overthrow the Boer government, Rhodes supported the Jameson Raid, an unsuccessful attempt to create an uprising in the Transvaal that had the tacit approval of Secretary of State for the Colonies Joseph Chamberlain. The raid was a catastrophic failure. It forced Cecil Rhodes to resign as Prime Minister of the Cape Colony, sent his oldest brother Col. Frank Rhodes to jail in Transvaal convicted of high treason and nearly sentenced to death, and contributed to the outbreak of the Second Boer War.

In 1899, Rhodes was sued by a man named Burrows for falsely representing the purpose of the raid and thereby convincing him to participate in the raid. Burrows was severely wounded and had to have his leg amputated. His suit for £3,000 in damages was successful.

== Expanding the British Empire ==
=== Rhodes and the Imperial Factor ===
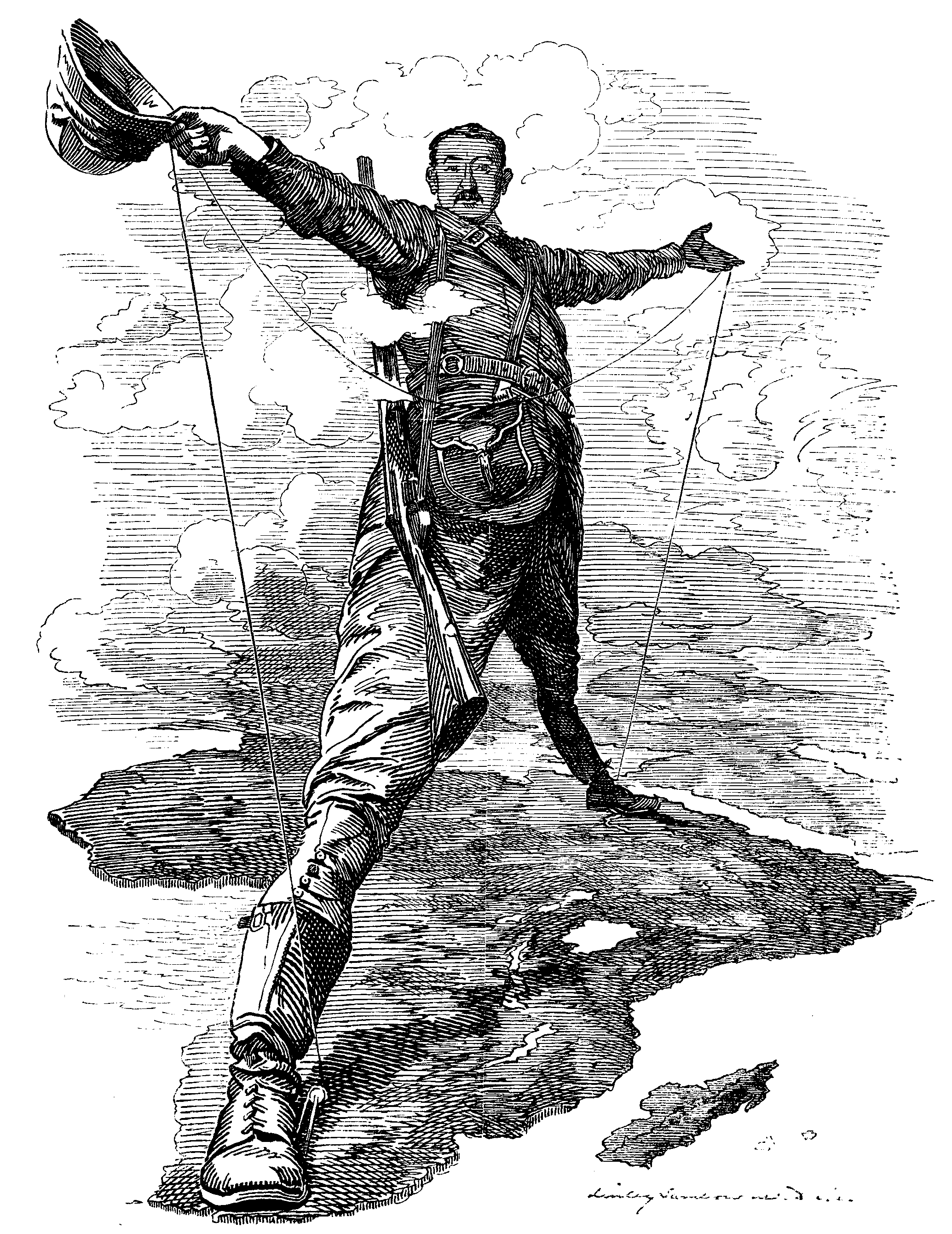
"The Rhodes Colossus" – a cartoon by Edward Linley Sambourne, published in Punch after Rhodes announced plans for a railway connection and telegraph line from Cape Town to Cairo in 1892

Rhodes used his wealth and that of his business partner Alfred Beit and other investors to pursue his dream of creating a British Empire in new territories to the north by obtaining mineral concessions from the most powerful indigenous chiefs. Rhodes's competitive advantage over other mineral prospecting companies was his combination of wealth and astute political instincts, also called the "imperial factor," as he often collaborated with the British Government. He befriended its local representatives, the British Commissioners, and through them organized British protectorates over the mineral concession areas via separate but related treaties. In this way he obtained both legality and security for mining operations. He could then attract more investors. Imperial expansion and capital investment went hand in hand.

The imperial factor was a double-edged sword: Rhodes did not want the bureaucrats of the Colonial Office in London to interfere in the Empire in Africa. He wanted British settlers and local politicians and governors to run it. This put him on a collision course with many in Britain, as well as with British missionaries, who favoured what they saw as the more ethical direct rule from London. Rhodes prevailed because he would pay the cost of administering the territories to the north of South Africa against his future mining profits. The Colonial Office did not have enough funding for this. Rhodes promoted his business interests as in the strategic interest of Britain: preventing the Portuguese, the Germans or the Boers from moving into south-central Africa. Rhodes's companies and agents cemented these advantages by obtaining many mining concessions, as exemplified by the Rudd and Lochner Concessions.

=== Treaties, concessions and charters ===
Rhodes had already tried and failed to get a mining concession from Lobengula, King of the Ndebele of Matabeleland. In 1888 he tried again. He sent John Smith Moffat, son of the missionary Robert Moffat, who was trusted by Lobengula, to persuade the latter to sign a treaty of friendship with Britain, and to look favourably on Rhodes's proposals. His associate Charles Rudd, together with Francis Thompson and Rochfort Maguire, assured Lobengula that no more than ten white men would mine in Matabeleland. This limitation was left out of the document, known as the Rudd Concession, which Lobengula signed. Furthermore, it stated that the mining companies could do anything necessary to their operations. When Lobengula discovered later the true effects of the concession, he tried to renounce it, but the British Government ignored him.

During the company's early days, Rhodes and his associates set themselves up to make millions (hundreds of millions in current pounds) over the coming years through what has been described as a "suppressio veri ... which must be regarded as one of Rhodes's least creditable actions". Contrary to what the British government and the public had been allowed to think, the Rudd Concession was not vested in the British South Africa Company, but in a short-lived ancillary concern of Rhodes, Rudd and a few others called the Central Search Association, which was quietly formed in London in 1889. This entity renamed itself the United Concessions Company in 1890, and soon after sold the Rudd Concession to the Chartered Company for 1,000,000 shares. When Colonial Office functionaries discovered this chicanery in 1891, they advised Secretary of State for the Colonies Viscount Knutsford to consider revoking the concession, but no action was taken.

Armed with the Rudd Concession, in 1889 Rhodes obtained a charter from the British Government for his British South Africa Company (BSAC) to rule, police, and make new treaties and concessions from the Limpopo River to the great lakes of Central Africa. He obtained further concessions and treaties north of the Zambezi, such as those in Barotseland (the Lochner Concession with King Lewanika in 1890, which was similar to the Rudd Concession); and in the Lake Mweru area (Alfred Sharpe's 1890 Kazembe concession). Rhodes also sent Sharpe to get a concession over mineral-rich Katanga, but met his match in ruthlessness: when Sharpe was rebuffed by its ruler Msiri, King Leopold II of Belgium obtained a concession over Msiri's dead body for his Congo Free State.

Rhodes also wanted Bechuanaland Protectorate incorporated in the BSAC charter. But three Tswana kings, including Khama III, travelled to Britain and won over British public opinion for it to remain governed by the British Colonial Office in London. Rhodes commented: "It is humiliating to be utterly beaten by these niggers."

The British Colonial Office also decided to administer British Central Africa owing to the activism of David Livingstone trying to end the East African Arab-Swahili slave trade. Rhodes paid much of the cost so that the British Central Africa Commissioner Sir Harry Johnston, and his successor Alfred Sharpe, would assist with security for Rhodes in the BSAC's north-eastern territories. Johnston shared Rhodes's expansionist views, but he and his successors were not as pro-settler as Rhodes, and disagreed on dealings with Africans.

=== Rhodesia ===
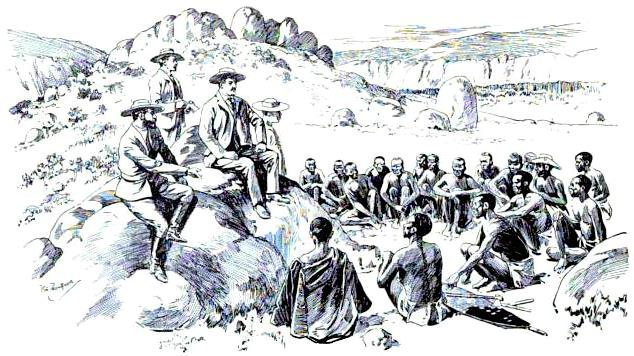
Rhodes and the Ndebele izinDuna make peace in the Matopos Hills, as depicted by Robert Baden-Powell, 1896

The BSAC had its own police force, the British South Africa Police, which was used to control Matabeleland and Mashonaland, in present-day Zimbabwe. The company had hoped to start a "new Rand" from the ancient gold mines of the Shona. Because gold deposits were not as plentiful as they had hoped, many of the white settlers who accompanied the BSAC to Mashonaland became farmers rather than miners. White settlers and their locally-employed Native Police engaged in widespread indiscriminate rape of Ndebele women in the early 1890s.

The Ndebele and the Shona—the two main, but rival, peoples—took advantage of the absence of most of the BSAP for the Jameson Raid in January 1896; they separately rebelled against the coming of the European settlers, and the BSAC defeated them in the Second Matabele War. Rhodes went to Matabeleland after his resignation as Cape Colony Premier, and appointed himself Colonel in his own column of irregular troops moving from Salisbury to Bulawayo to relieve the siege of whites there. He remained Managing Director of the BSAC (with power of attorney to take decisions without reference back to the Board in London) until June 1896, defying Chamberlain's calls to resign, and he gave instructions that no mercy be shown in putting down the rebellion, telling officers that "Your instructions are" he told a major, to "do the most harm you can to the natives around you." He ordered a police officer to "kill all you can", even those Ndebele who begged for mercy and threw down their arms. Shortly after learning of the assassination of the Ndebele spiritual leader, Mlimo, by the American scout Frederick Russell Burnham, and after participating in the cavalry charge at one of the last pitched battles of this phase of the war, Rhodes's associate Johan Colenbrander arranged for a meeting with the remaining Ndebele chiefs. Rhodes and a few colleagues walked unarmed into the Ndebele stronghold in Matobo Hills. In a series of meetings between August and October, he persuaded the Impi to lay down their arms, thus ending the Second Matabele War.

In the aftermath of the war in Matabeleland, but whilst the uprising in Mashonaland was being suppressed, Rhodes returned to London to give evidence to the UK House of Commons Select Committee of Enquiry into the Jameson Raid. As Rhodes had incriminating telegrams demonstrating the complicity and foreknowledge of the Raid by Joseph Chamberlain, the Colonial Secretary, he and his solicitor were able to blackmail Chamberlain into retaining the BSAC Charter, leaving the Company in charge of administering the territory north of the Limpopo even as it became a Crown colony. Rhodes returned to Mashonaland, further overseeing the suppression of the uprising there into 1897. The scandal attached to his name did not prevent him rejoining the board of the BSAC in 1898. He remained an MP in the Cape Parliament and a Privy Councillor.

By the end of 1894, the territories over which the BSAC had concessions or treaties, collectively called "Zambesia" after the Zambezi River flowing through the middle, comprised an area of 1,143,000 km^{2} between the Limpopo River and Lake Tanganyika. In May 1895, its name was officially changed to "Rhodesia", reflecting Rhodes's popularity among settlers who had been using the name informally since 1891. The designation Southern Rhodesia was officially adopted in 1898 for the part south of the Zambezi, which later became Zimbabwe; and the designations North-Western and North-Eastern Rhodesia were used from 1895 for the territory which later became Northern Rhodesia, then Zambia. He built a house for himself in 1897 in Bulawayo.

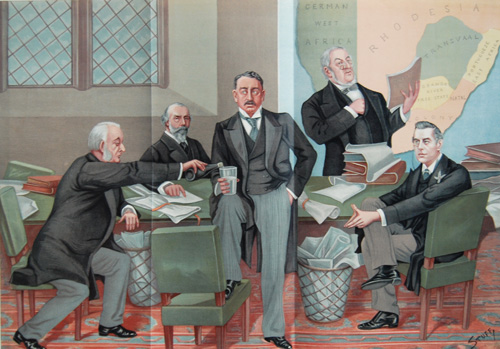
"Empire Makers and Breakers" depicted by Henry Wright, showing a scene at the South Africa Committee in 1897. Left to right: Her Majesty's Attorney-General Richard Webster, Henry Labouchère (remembered for the Labouchère Amendment, which for the first time criminalised all male homosexual activity), Cecil Rhodes, 'The Squire of Malwood' William Harcourt, and Joseph Chamberlain

Rhodes decreed in his will that he was to be buried in Matopos Hills (now Matobo Hills). After his death in the Cape in 1902, his body was transported by train to Bulawayo. His burial was attended by Ndebele chiefs, now paid agents of the BSAC administration, who asked that the firing party should not discharge their rifles as this would disturb the spirits. Then, for the first time, they gave a white man the Matabele royal salute, Bayete. Rhodes is buried alongside Leander Starr Jameson and 34 British soldiers killed in the Shangani Patrol. Despite occasional efforts to return his body to the United Kingdom, his grave remains there still, "part and parcel of the history of Zimbabwe" and attracts thousands of visitors each year.

=== "Cape to Cairo Red Line" ===
Rhodes's personal flag symbolising his "Cape to Cairo" dream

Map showing almost complete British control of the Cape to Cairo route, 1913 British control

One of Rhodes's dreams was for a "red line" on the map from the Cape to Cairo (on geo-political maps, British dominions were always denoted in red or pink). Rhodes had been instrumental in securing southern African states for the Empire. He and others felt the best way to "unify the possessions, facilitate governance, enable the military to move quickly to hot spots or conduct war, help settlement, and foster trade" would be to build the "Cape to Cairo Railway".

This enterprise was not without its problems. France had a conflicting strategy in the late 1890s to link its colonies from west to east across the continent and the Portuguese produced the "Pink Map", representing their claims to sovereignty in Africa. Ultimately, Belgium and Germany proved to be the main obstacles to the British objective until the United Kingdom conquered and seized Tanganyika from the Germans as a League of Nations mandate in World War I.

== Second Boer War ==
During the Second Boer War Rhodes went to Kimberley at the onset of the siege, in a calculated move to raise the political stakes on the government to dedicate resources to the defence of the city. The military felt he was more of a liability than an asset and found him intolerable. The officer commanding the garrison of Kimberley, Lieutenant Colonel Robert Kekewich, experienced serious personal difficulties with Rhodes because of the latter's inability to co-operate.

Despite these differences, Rhodes's company was instrumental in the defence of the city, providing water and refrigeration facilities, constructing fortifications, and manufacturing an armoured train, shells and a one-off gun named Long Cecil.

Rhodes used his position and influence to lobby the British government to relieve the siege of Kimberley, claiming in the press that the situation in the city was desperate. The military wanted to assemble a large force to take the Boer cities of Bloemfontein and Pretoria, but they were compelled to change their plans and send three separate smaller forces to relieve the sieges of Kimberley, Mafeking and Ladysmith.

== Death ==
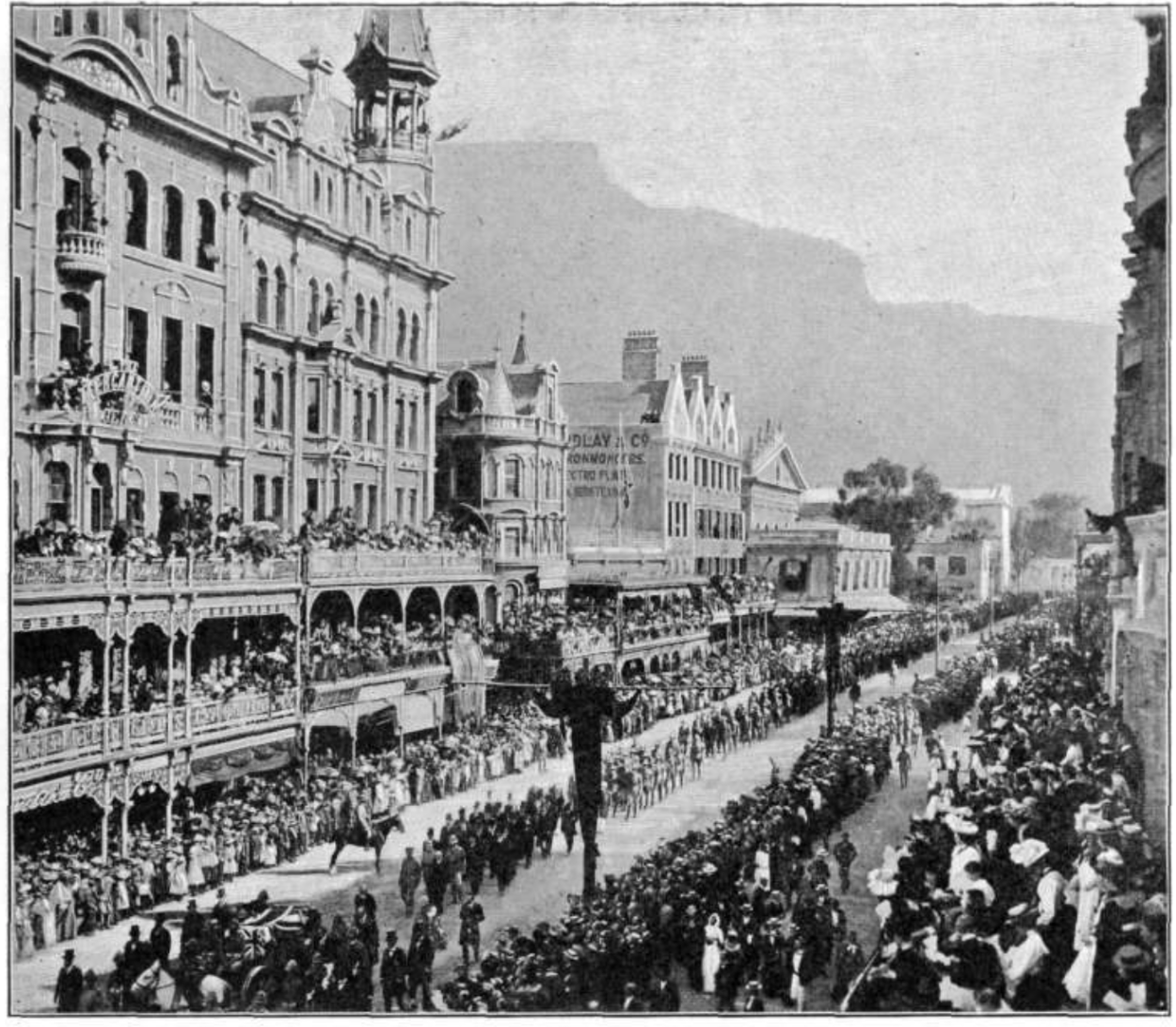
Funeral procession of Rhodes in Adderley Street, Cape Town, on 3 April 1902

Although Rhodes remained a leading figure in the politics of southern Africa, especially during the Second Boer War, he was dogged by ill health throughout his relatively short life.

He was sent to Natal aged 16 because it was believed the climate might help problems with his heart. On returning to England in 1872, his health again deteriorated with heart and lung problems, to the extent that his doctor, Sir Morell Mackenzie, believed he would survive only six months. He returned to Kimberley where his health improved. From age 40 his heart condition returned with increasing severity until his death from heart failure in 1902, aged 48, at his seaside cottage in Muizenberg.

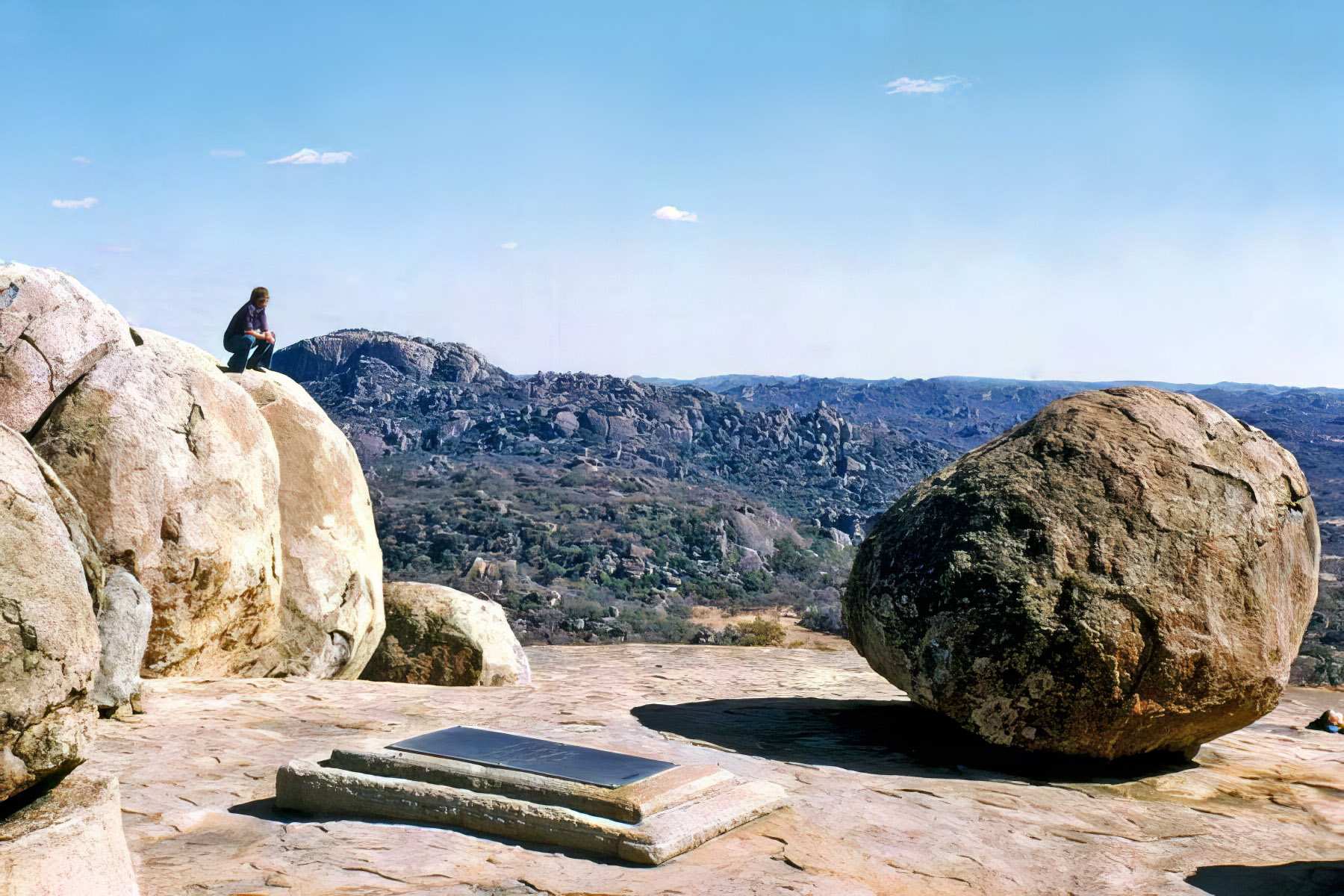
Rhodes's grave in Matopo Hills

The government arranged a journey by train from the Cape to Rhodesia, with the funeral train stopping at every station to allow mourners to pay their respects. It was reported that at Kimberley, "practically the entire population marched in procession past the funeral car". He was finally laid to rest at his request at Malindidzimu, a hilltop located approximately 35 kilometres (22 mi) south of Bulawayo, in what was then Rhodesia. The site was of supreme importance to Shona traditional religion as the shrine of Mwari, with this action interpreted as a gesture of colonial triumph and conquest over indigenous Africans. Today, his gravesite is part of Matobo National Park, Zimbabwe.

== Personal life ==
Rhodes never married, pleading, "I have too much work on my hands" and saying that he would not be a dutiful husband. According to his personal banker, Lewis Mitchell, Rhodes "took, on occasions, a singularly human interest in the welfare of young men, and read their characters with discernment... Once, when twitted [teased] with his preference for young men, he retorted, 'Of course, of course, they must soon take up our work; we must teach them what to do and what to avoid.'" According to his secretary, Philip Jourdan, he "seemed to have a liking for young men" and was "particularly partial to people with blue eyes". Graham Bower, the deputy to Sir Hercules Robinson, described the relationship between Rhodes and his private secretary Neville Pickering as "an absolutely lover-like friendship".

Rhodes's biographers have been divided on the question of his sexuality. John Gilbert Lockhart and C. M. Woodhouse denied that Rhodes was homosexual, while Stuart Cloete took the view that he was asexual. Robert I. Rotberg and Brian Roberts have asserted that he was homosexual. According to Rotberg, that Rhodes was homosexual is "indisputable on the basis of the available evidence". The BBC's biographical drama series Rhodes (1996), written by Antony Thomas, treated him as gay. Robin Brown has claimed in The Secret Society: Cecil John Rhodes's Plan for a New World Order that Rhodes was homosexual who was in love with Neville Pickering, and that he established "a homosexual hegemony—which was already operative in the Secret Society—[and] went on to influence, if not control, British politics at the beginning of the twentieth century". Paul Maylam of the eponymous Rhodes University criticised Brown's book in a review for The Conversation as "based heavily on surmise and assertion" and lacking "referenced source material to substantiate its claims", as well as being riddled with basic factual errors.

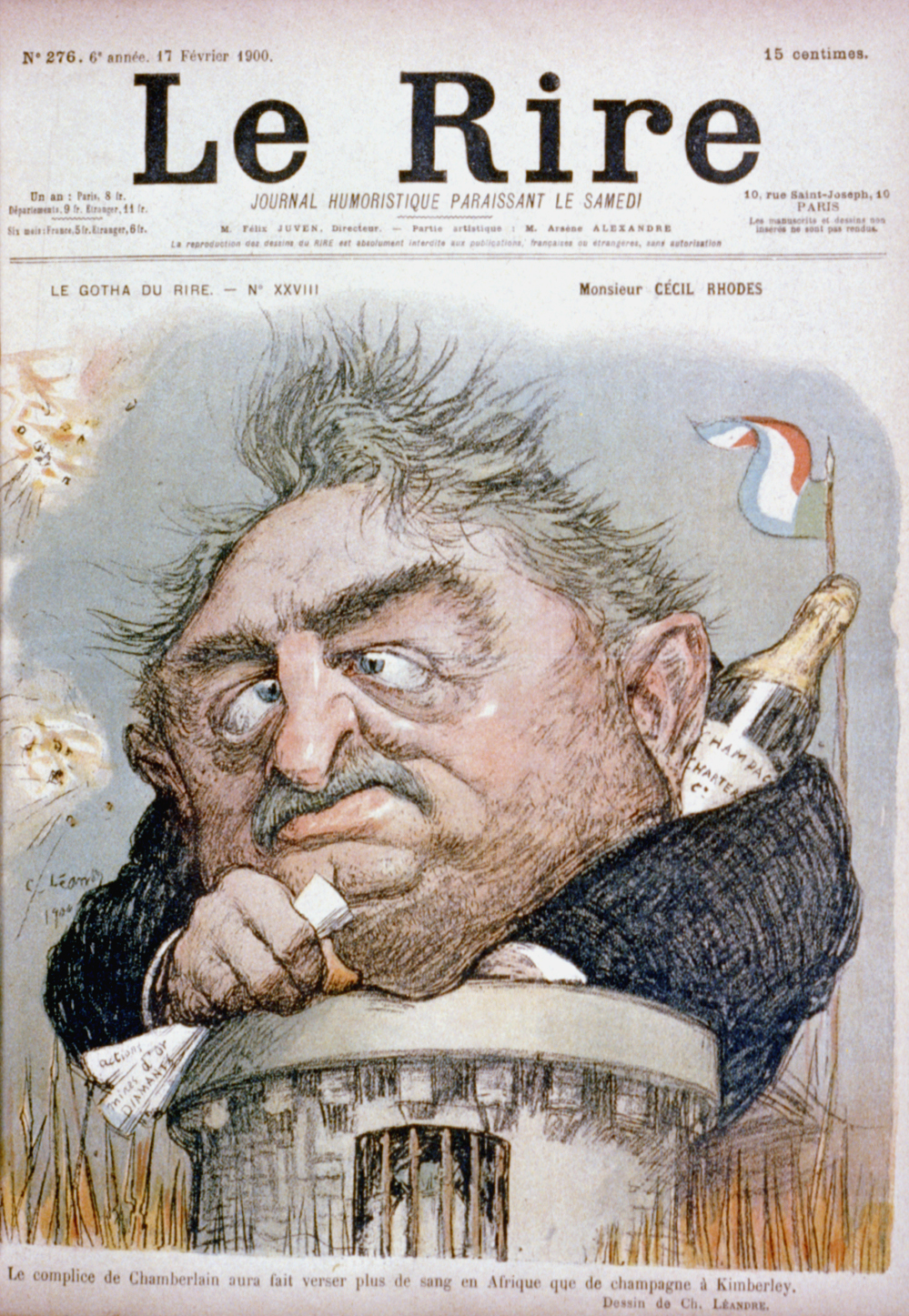
French caricature of Rhodes, showing him trapped in Kimberley during the Second Boer War, here peering from a tower clutching papers, with a champagne bottle behind his collar

=== Princess Radziwiłł ===
In the last years of his life, Rhodes was stalked by Polish princess Catherine Radziwiłł, born Rzewuska, who had married into the noble Polish family Radziwiłł. The princess falsely claimed that she was engaged to Rhodes, and that they were having an affair. She asked him to marry her, but Rhodes refused. Subsequently, she accused him of loan fraud and he had to go to trial and testify against her accusations, which were proven false. She later wrote a biography of Rhodes called Cecil Rhodes: Man and Empire Maker.

== Political views ==
Rhodes wanted to expand the British Empire because he believed that the Anglo-Saxon race was destined to greatness. In what he described as "a draft of some of my ideas" written in 1877 while a student at Oxford, Rhodes said of the English, "I contend that we are the first race in the world, and that the more of the world we inhabit the better it is for the human race. I contend that every acre added to our territory means the birth of more of the English race who otherwise would not be brought into existence." Rhodes bemoaned that there was little land left to conquer and said "to think of these stars that you see overhead at night, these vast worlds which we can never reach. I would annex the planets if I could; I often think of that. It makes me sad to see them so clear and yet so far".

Furthermore, Rhodes saw imperialism as a way to alleviate domestic social problems:

In order to save the 40,000,000 inhabitants of the United Kingdom from a bloody civil war, we colonial statesmen must acquire new lands to settle the surplus population, to provide new markets for the goods produced in the factories and mines. The Empire, as I have always said, is a bread and butter question. If you want to avoid civil war, you must become imperialists.

Rhodes wanted to develop a Commonwealth in which all of the British-dominated countries in the empire would be represented in the British Parliament. Rhodes explicitly stipulated in his will that all races should be eligible for the scholarships. However, while "many nonwhite students have benefited from the scholarships, it is doubtful that such was Rhodes’s intention. He once defined his policy as "equal rights for every white man south of the Zambezi" and later, under liberal pressure, amended “white” to “civilized.” But he probably regarded the possibility of native Africans becoming “civilized” as so remote that the two expressions, in his mind, came to the same thing.".

It is said that he wanted to develop an American elite of philosopher-kings who would have the United States rejoin the British Empire. As Rhodes also respected and admired the Germans and their Kaiser, Wilhelm II, he allowed German students to be included in the Rhodes scholarships. He believed that eventually the United Kingdom (including Ireland), the US, and Germany together would dominate the world and ensure perpetual peace.

Rhodes's views on race have been debated; he supported the rights of indigenous Africans to vote, but critics have labelled him as an "architect of apartheid" and a "white supremacist", particularly since 2015. According to Magubane, Rhodes was "unhappy that in many Cape Constituencies, Africans could be decisive if more of them exercised this right to vote under current law [referring to the Cape Qualified Franchise]," with Rhodes arguing that "the native is to be treated as a child and denied the franchise. We must adopt a system of despotism, such as works in India, in our relations with the barbarism of South Africa". Rhodes advocated the governance of indigenous Africans living in the Cape Colony "in a state of barbarism and communal tenure" as "a subject race. I do not go so far as the member for Victoria West, who would not give the black man a vote. ... If the whites maintain their position as the supreme race, the day may come when we shall be thankful that we have the natives with us in their proper position."

He once stated "I prefer land to niggers" and referred to the 'Anglo-Saxon race' as "the best, most human, most honourable race the world possesses". He thought that those lands which were occupied by the "most despicable specimens of human beings" should be inhabited by Anglo-Saxons.

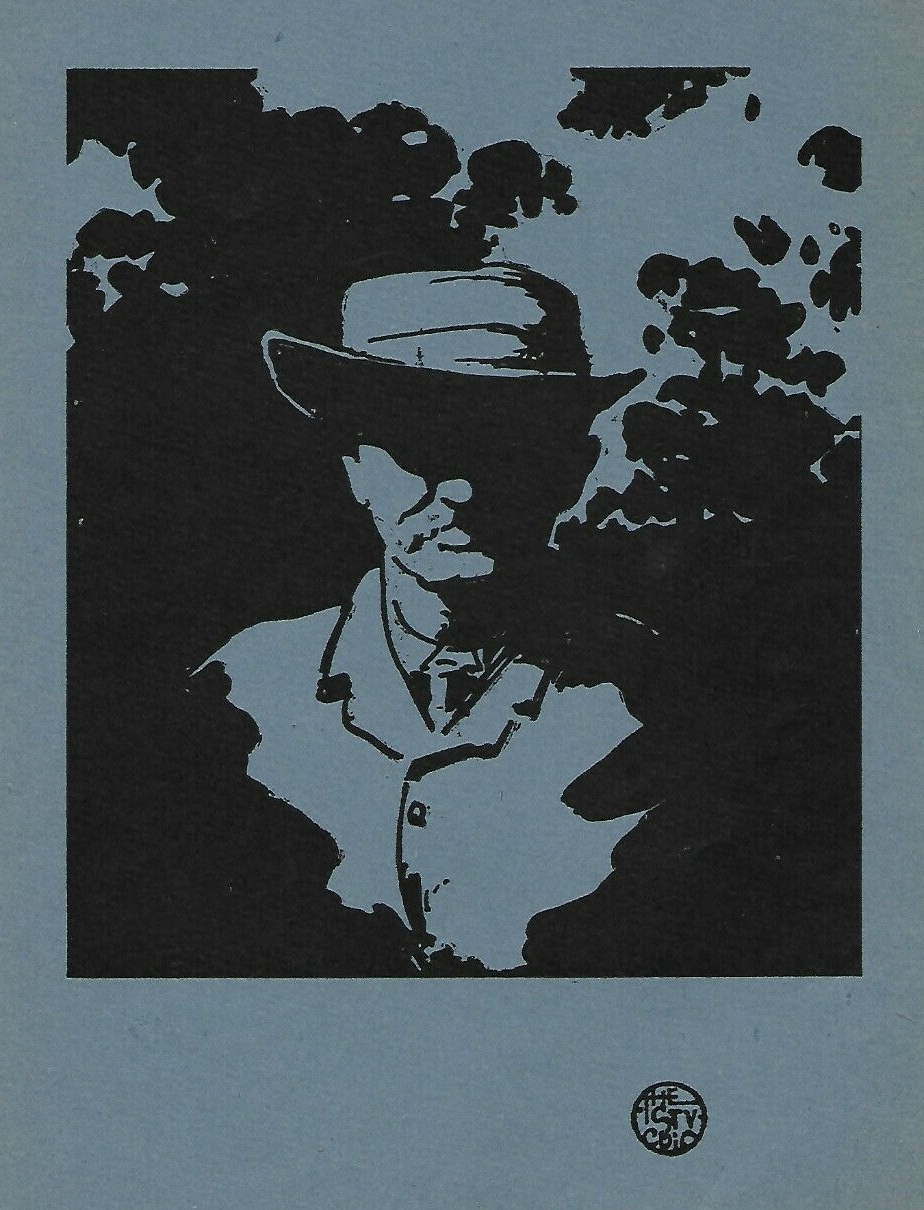
Rhodes by Mortimer Menpes, 1901

However others have disputed these views. For example, historian Raymond C. Mensing notes that Rhodes has the reputation as the most flamboyant exemplar of the British imperial spirit, and always believed that British institutions were the best. Mensing argues that Rhodes quietly developed a more nuanced concept of imperial federation in Africa, and that his mature views were more balanced and realistic. According to Mensing, "Rhodes was not a biological or maximal racist. Despite his support for what became the basis for the apartheid system, he is best seen as a cultural or minimal racist". In a 2016 opinion piece for The Times, Oxford University professor Nigel Biggar argued that although Rhodes was a committed imperialist, the charges of racism against him are unfounded. In a 2021 article, Biggar further argued that:

If Rhodes was a racist, he would not have enjoyed cordial relations with individual Africans, he would not have regarded them as capable of civilisation, and he would not have supported their right to vote at all. Nor would he have stipulated in his final will of July 1899 that the scholarships that would famously bear his name should be awarded without regard for "race". And yet he did all these things.

On domestic politics within Britain, Rhodes was a supporter of the Liberal Party. Rhodes's only major impact was his large-scale support of the Irish nationalist party, led by Charles Stewart Parnell (1846–1891).

Rhodes worked well with the Afrikaners in the Cape Colony; he supported teaching Dutch as well as English in public schools. While Prime Minister of the Cape Colony, he helped to remove most of their legal disabilities. He was a friend of Jan Hofmeyr, leader of the Afrikaner Bond, and it was largely because of Afrikaner support that he became Prime Minister of the Cape Colony. Rhodes advocated greater self-government for the Cape Colony, in line with his preference for the empire to be controlled by local settlers and politicians rather than by London.

Scholar and Zimbabwean author Peter Godwin—whilst critical of Rhodes—writes that he needs to be viewed via the prisms and cultural and social perspective of his epoch, positing that:

[Rhodes] was no 19th-century Hitler. He wasn't so much a freak as a man of his time ... Rhodes and the white pioneers in southern Africa did behave despicably by today's standards, but no worse than the white settlers in North America, South America, and Australia; and in some senses better, considering that the genocide of natives in Africa was less complete. For all the former African colonies are now ruled by indigenous peoples, unlike the Americas and the Antipodes, most of whose aboriginal natives were all but exterminated. [...] Rhodes and his cronies fit in perfectly with their surroundings and conformed to the morality (or lack of it) of the day. As is so often the case, history simply followed the gravitational pull of superior firepower."

== Legacy ==
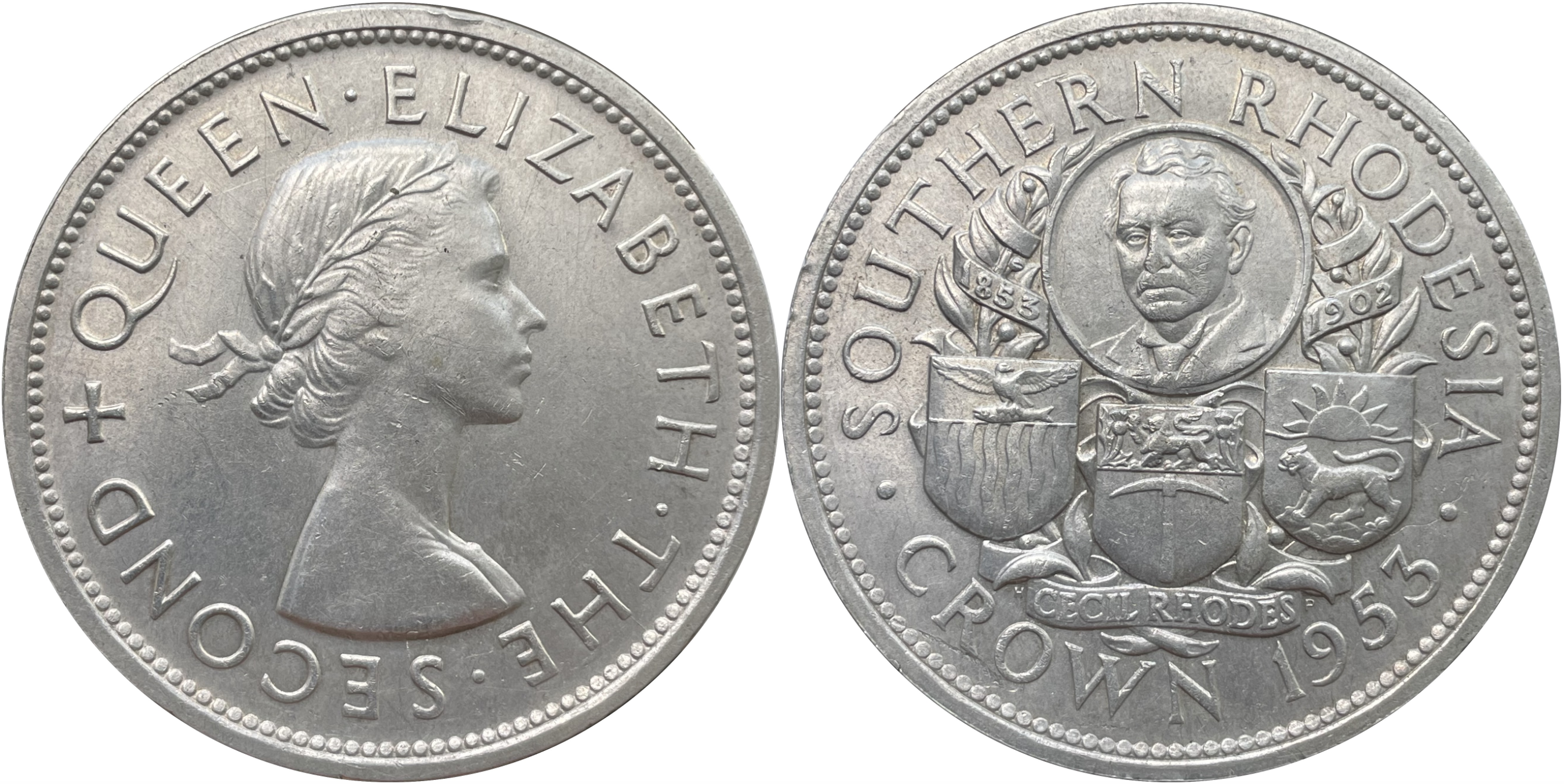
Silver coin: 1 crown Southern Rhodesia; Bust of Cecil John Rhodes, the Prime Minister of the Cape Colony, colonial magnate, and namesake of Southern Rhodesia, in a circle in the centre and three shields for each colony developed by Rhodes, representing (from left to right) Northern Rhodesia, Southern Rhodesia, and Nyasaland below, all flanked by two wreaths wrapped in banners

Rhodes has been the target of much criticism, with some historians attacking him as a ruthless imperialist and white supremacist. The continued presence of his grave in the Matopos (now Matobo) hills has not been without controversy in contemporary Zimbabwe. In December 2010, Cain Mathema, the governor of Bulawayo, branded the grave outside the country's second city an "insult to the African ancestors" and said he believed its presence had brought bad luck and poor weather to the region.

In February 2012, Mugabe loyalists and ZANU-PF activists visited the grave site demanding permission from the local chief to exhume Rhodes's remains and return them to Britain. Many considered this a nationalist political stunt in the run up to an election, and Local Chief Masuku and Godfrey Mahachi, one of the country's foremost archaeologists, strongly expressed their opposition to the grave being removed due to its historical significance to Zimbabwe. Then-president Robert Mugabe also opposed the move. In 2004, Rhodes was voted 56th in the SABC 3 television series Great South Africans. A preparatory school in the Midlands town of Gweru in Zimbabwe is named after him. In the early 2000s during the height of the land reform and racial tensions, ZANU-PF politicians called for a change in all the country's school names with colonial ties, however, efforts were mostly fruitless as most people felt that it was unnecessary and names of places they live in reflect the diverse identity and cultural heritage of the country but called for the government to embrace the history of the country and allow room for new names for new places in the ever-growing towns and cities.

In his second will, written in 1877 before he had accumulated his wealth, Rhodes wanted to create a secret society that would bring the whole world under British rule. His biographer calls it an "extensive fantasy." Rhodes envisioned a secret society to extend British rule worldwide, including China, Japan, all of Africa and South America, and indeed the United States as well:

To and for the establishment, promotion and development of a Secret Society, the true aim and object whereof shall be for the extension of British rule throughout the world, the perfecting of a system of emigration from the United Kingdom, and of colonisation by British subjects of all lands where the means of livelihood are attainable by energy, labour and enterprise, and especially the occupation by British settlers of the entire Continent of Africa, the Holy Land, the Valley of the Euphrates, the Islands of Cyprus and Candia, the whole of South America, the Islands of the Pacific not heretofore possessed by Great Britain, the whole of the Malay Archipelago, the seaboard of China and Japan, the ultimate recovery of the United States of America as an integral part of the British Empire, the inauguration of a system of Colonial representation in the Imperial Parliament which may tend to weld together the disjointed members of the Empire and, finally, the foundation of so great a Power as to render wars impossible, and promote the best interests of humanity.

— Cecil Rhodes

Rhodes's final will—when he actually did have money—was much more realistic and focused on scholarships. He also left a large area of land on the slopes of Table Mountain to the South African nation. Part of this estate became the upper campus of the University of Cape Town, another part became the Kirstenbosch National Botanical Garden, while much was spared from development and is now an important conservation area.

South Africa's Rhodes University is named after him.

=== Rhodes Scholarship ===
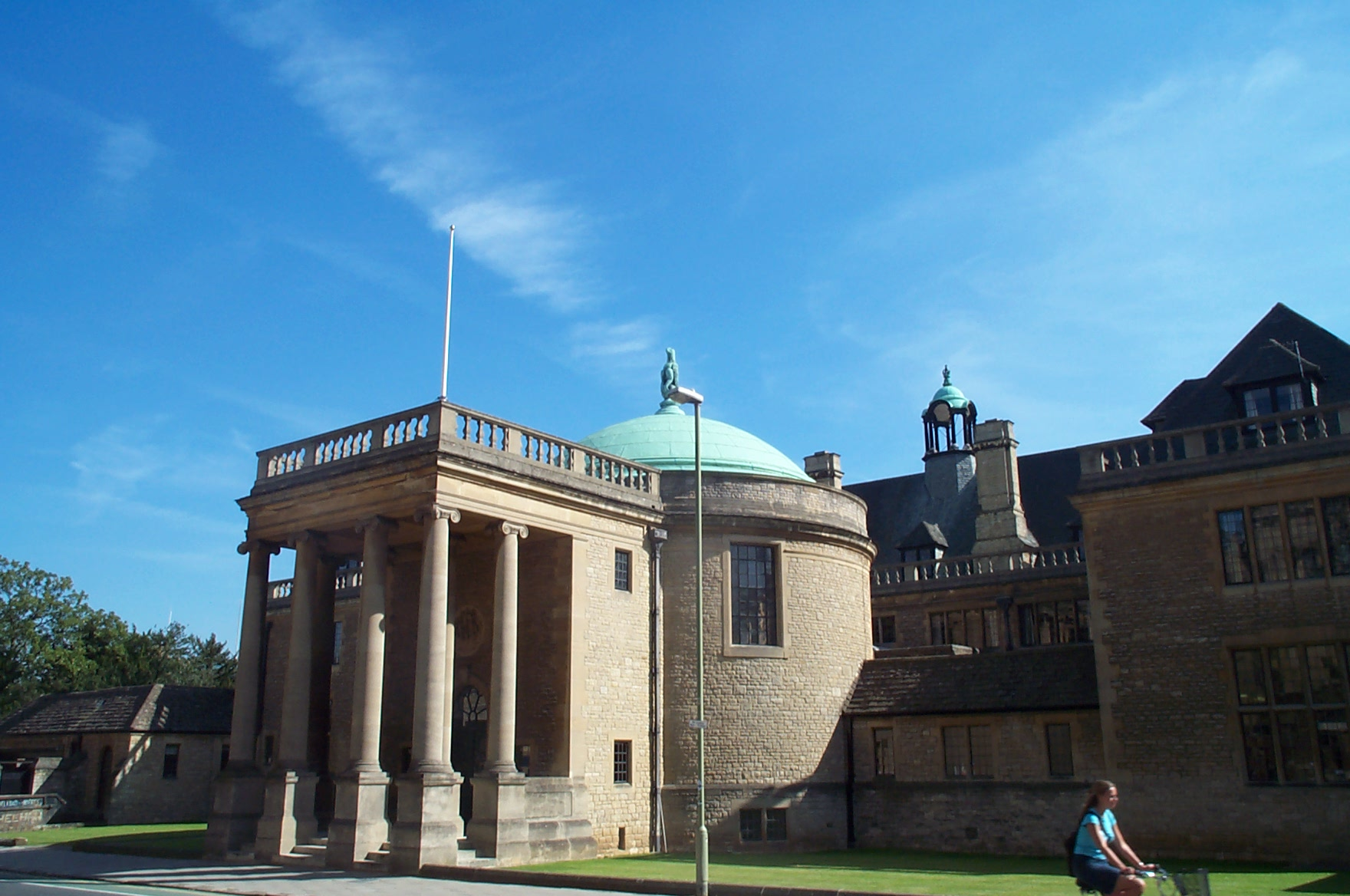
Rhodes House, Oxford, in 2004

In his last will, Rhodes provided for the establishment of the Rhodes Scholarship. Over the course of the previous half-century, governments, universities and individuals in the settler colonies had been establishing travelling scholarships for this purpose. The Rhodes awards fit the established pattern. The scholarship enabled male students from territories under British rule or formerly under British rule and from Germany to study at Rhodes's alma mater, the University of Oxford. Rhodes's aims were to promote leadership marked by public spirit and good character, and to "render war impossible" by promoting friendship between the great powers.

=== Memorials ===
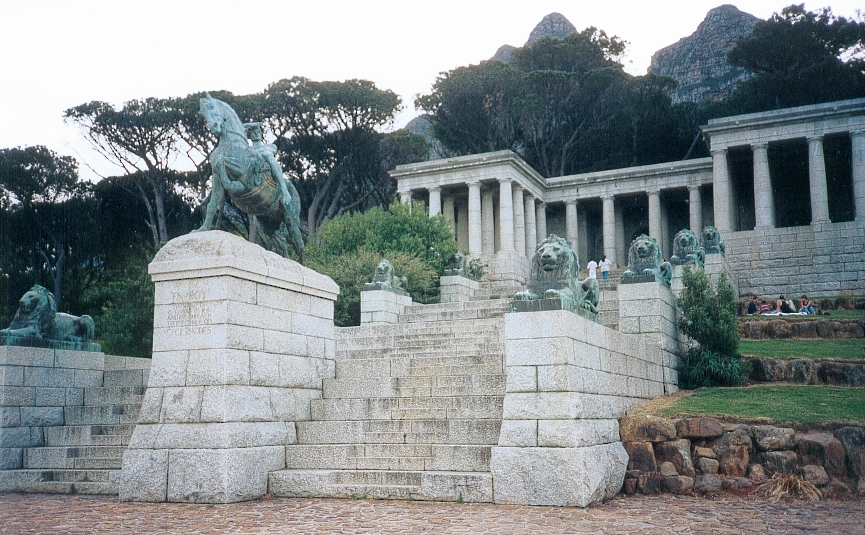
Rhodes Memorial at Devil's Peak (Cape Town)

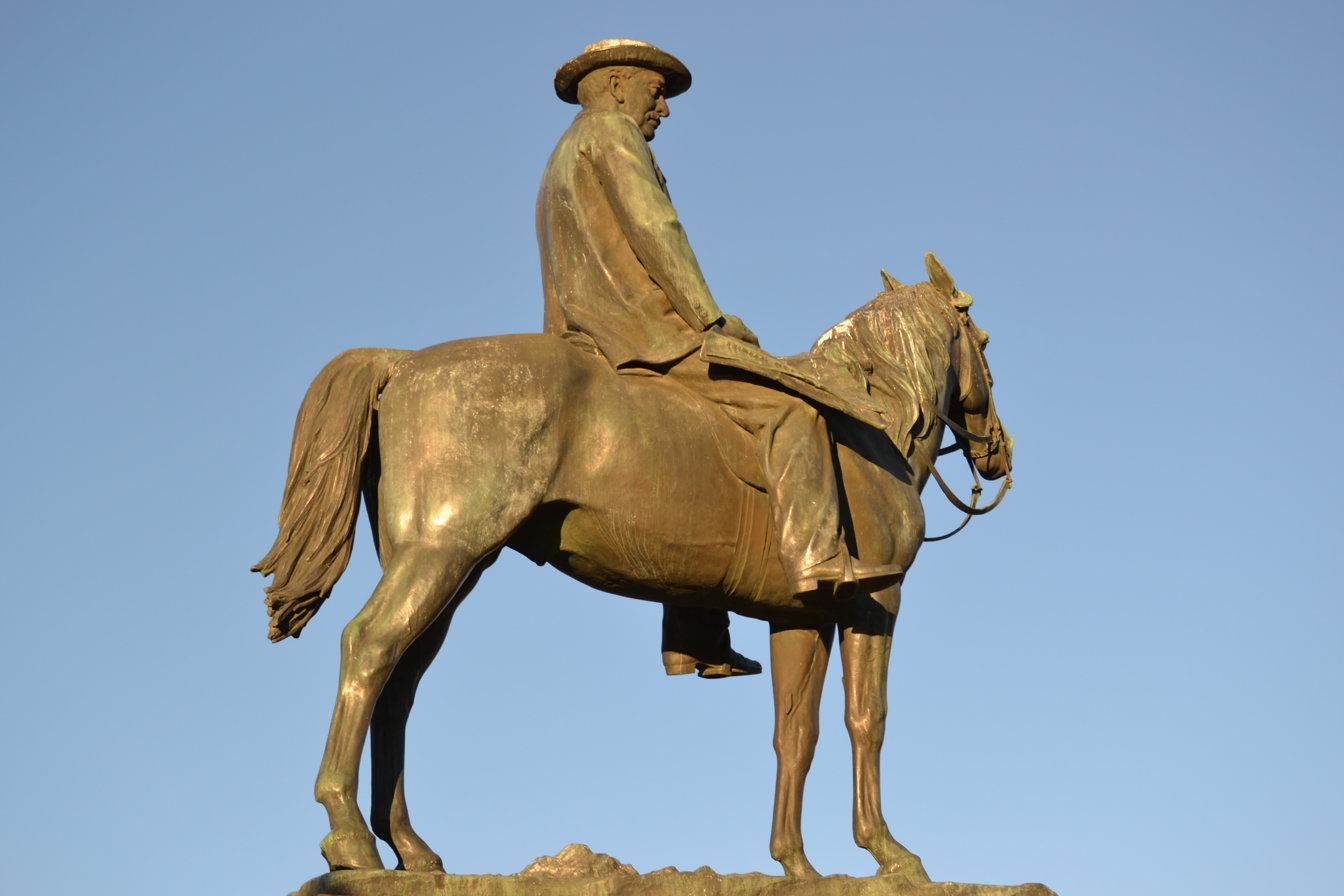
Statue of Rhodes in Kimberley, Northern Cape

Rhodes Memorial stands on Rhodes's favourite spot on the slopes of Devil's Peak, Cape Town, with a view looking north and east towards the Cape to Cairo route. From 1910 to 1984 Rhodes's house in Cape Town, Groote Schuur, was the official Cape residence of the prime ministers of South Africa and continued as a presidential residence.

His birthplace was established in 1938 as the Rhodes Memorial Museum, now known as Bishops Stortford Museum. The cottage in Muizenberg where he died is a provincial heritage site in the Western Cape Province of South Africa. The cottage today is operated as a museum by the Muizenberg Historical Conservation Society, and is open to the public. A broad display of Rhodes material can be seen, including the original De Beers board room table around which diamonds worth billions of dollars were traded.

Rhodes University College, now Rhodes University, in Grahamstown, was established in his name by his trustees and founded by Act of Parliament on 31 May 1904.

The residents of Kimberley, Northern Cape elected to build a memorial in Rhodes's honour in their city, which was unveiled in 1907. The 72-ton bronze statue depicts Rhodes on his horse, looking north with map in hand, and dressed as he was when he met the Ndebele after their rebellion.

The founder of the original country of Rhodesia (now Zimbabwe), Cecil John Rhodes first visited Nyanga in the Eastern Highlands of the country in 1897. Captivated by the unspoilt and breathtaking beauty of the area, he immediately purchased a parcel of farms totalling 40,000 ha and then proceeded to import cattle from Mozambique and develop extensive plantations of apple and fruit trees. When he died in 1902, Rhodes bequeathed most of the estate to the nation, and this now forms the Nyanga National Park. Rhodes's original farmhouse has been meticulously preserved and is now the Rhodes Nyanga Hotel.

==== Opposition ====
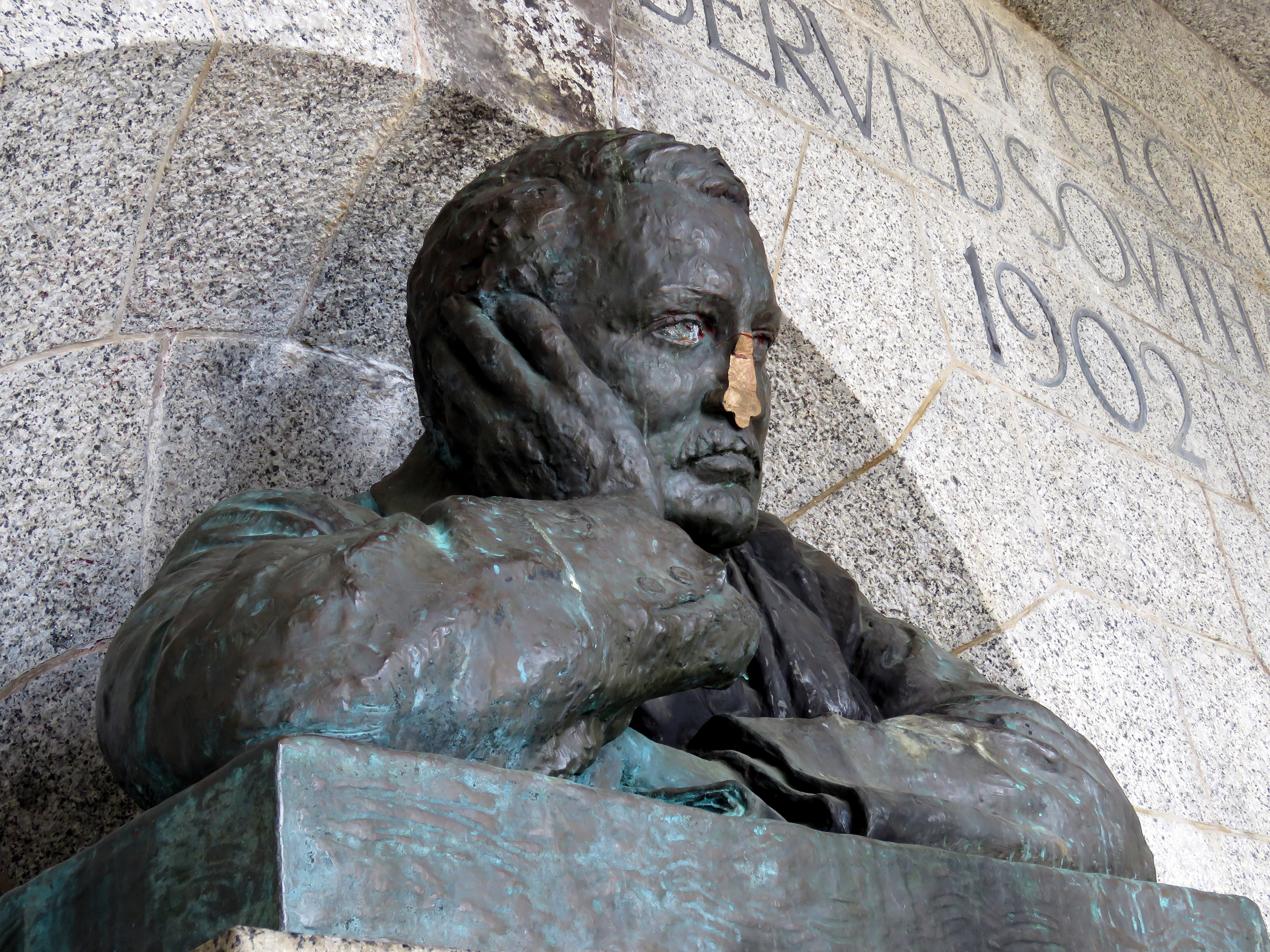
Noseless bust at the Rhodes Memorial, Cape Town

Memorials to Rhodes have been opposed since at least the 1950s, when some Afrikaner students demanded the removal of a Rhodes statue at the University of Cape Town. A 2015 movement, known as "Rhodes Must Fall" (or #RhodesMustFall on social media), began with student protests at the University of Cape Town that were successful in getting university authorities to remove the Rhodes statue from the campus. The protest also had the broader goal of highlighting what the activists considered the lack of systemic post-apartheid racial transformation in South African institutions.

Following a series of protests and vandalism at the University of Cape Town, various movements both in South Africa and other countries have been launched in opposition to Cecil Rhodes memorials. These include a campaign to change the name of Rhodes University and to remove a statue of Rhodes from Oriel College, Oxford. The campaign was covered in a documentary by Channel 4, which was called The Battle for Britain's Heroes. The documentary was commissioned after Afua Hirsch wrote an article on the topic. Moreover, an article by Amit Chaudhuri, in The Guardian, suggested the criticism was "unsurprising and overdue". Other academics including Kehinde Andrews, prominent British academic and author specialising in Black studies, have vocally spoken in favour of #RhodesMustFall. However, Oriel College opted to keep the Rhodes statue, despite the protests. Oriel College claimed in 2016 they would lose about £100 million worth of gifts if they removed the statue. Nevertheless, in June 2020, the college voted in favour of setting up an independent commission of inquiry, amid widespread support for removing the statue. A statue of Rhodes was erected in the city of Bulawayo in 1904 in the city centre. In 1981 after the country's independence the statue was removed to the centenary park at the Natural History Museum of Zimbabwe.

Encyclopædia Britannica, discussing his legacy, wrote of Rhodes that he "once defined his policy as 'equal rights for every white man south of the Zambezi' and later, under liberal pressure, amended 'white' to 'civilized'. But he probably regarded the possibility of native Africans becoming 'civilized' as so remote that the two expressions, in his mind, came to the same thing."

As part of his legacy, on his death Rhodes left a significant amount of money to be used to finance talented young scholars ("race" was not a criterion) at Oxford. Currently, in Oxford a number of those South African and Zimbabwean recipients of funds from his legacy are campaigning for his statue to be removed from display in Oxford. When asked if there was any double standard or hypocrisy in being funded by the Rhodes Scholarship fund and benefiting from the opportunity, whilst at the same time campaigning against the legacy of Rhodes, one of the South African campaigners, Ntokozo Qwabe, replied that "this scholarship does not buy our silence...There is no hypocrisy in being a recipient of a Rhodes scholarship and being publicly critical of Cecil Rhodes and his legacy ... There is no clause that binds us to find 'the good' in Rhodes' character, nor to sanitise the imperialist, colonial agenda he propagated".

In June 2020, amid the wider context of Black Lives Matter protests, the governing body of Oxford's Oriel College voted to remove the statue of Rhodes located on the college's façade facing Oxford's High Street. The actual removal was not to take place until at least early spring 2021, when a commission set up by the college delivered its report on the future of the statue. In May 2021, the commission reported that, while the majority of members supported the statue's removal, the costs to do so were prohibitively high, and the college would therefore not be taking action.

== Popular culture ==
- Mark Twain's sarcastic summation of Rhodes ("I admire him, I frankly confess it; and when his time comes I shall buy a piece of the rope for a keepsake"), from Chapter LXIX of Following the Equator, still often appears in collections of famous insults. (Note: His account of how "Cecil Rhodes" made his first fortune by discovering, in Australia, in the belly of a shark, a newspaper that gave him advance knowledge of a great rise in wool prices, is completely fictional—Twain dates the event at 1870, when Rhodes was in South Africa.)
- He is depicted, along with other Cape notables, in the 1899 artwork Holiday Time in Cape Town by James Ford.
- The will of Cecil Rhodes is the central theme in the science fiction book Great Work of Time by John Crowley, an alternative history in which the Secret Society stipulated in the will was indeed established. Its members eventually achieve the secret of time travel and use it to restrain World War I and prevent World War II, and to perpetuate the world ascendancy of the British Empire up to the end of the twentieth century. The book contains a vivid description of Cecil Rhodes himself, seen through the eyes of a traveller from the future British Empire.
- In the British film Rhodes of Africa (1936, directed by Austrian filmmaker Berthold Viertel), Rhodes was portrayed by Canadian actor Walter Huston.
- Rhodes is the unofficial mascot of Uncomfortable Oxford, an Oxford-based tour guide and history organisation which focuses on British imperial history. Much of their promotional material, tours and speeches all focus on Rhodes's statue outside of Oriel College, Oxford, and they were central to organising the 2020 Oxford Black Lives Matter protests following the murder of George Floyd.
- Rhodes was played by Ferdinand Marian in the Nazi film Ohm Krüger (1941), where he—like all other British characters in the film—was presented as an outright villain.
- In 1901, Rhodes bought Dalham Hall, Suffolk. In 1902, Colonel Frank Rhodes erected the village hall in the village of Dalham, near Bury St Edmunds, to commemorate the life of his brother, who had died before taking possession of the estate.
- Rhodes was a peripheral but influential character in the historical novel The Covenant by James Michener.
- His memorial at Devil's Peak also served as a temple in The Adventures of Sinbad episode "The Return of the Ronin".
- The 1976 Hugh Masekela album Colonial Man has a song titled "Cecil Rhodes".
- Cecil Rhodes was the subject of a South African television mini-series, Barney Barnato, made in 1989 and first aired on SABC in early 1990.
- In 1996, BBC-TV made an eight-part television drama about Rhodes called Rhodes: The Life and Legend of Cecil Rhodes. It was produced by David Drury and written by Antony Thomas. It tells the story of Rhodes's life through a series of flashbacks of conversations between him and Princess Catherine Radziwiłł and also between her and people who knew him. It also shows the story of how she stalked and eventually ruined him. In the serial, Cecil Rhodes is played by Martin Shaw, the younger Cecil Rhodes is played by his son Joe Shaw, and Princess Radziwiłł is played by Frances Barber. In the serial Rhodes is portrayed as ruthless and greedy. The serial also suggests that he was homosexual. Countering the implication of Rhodes's homosexuality, historian and journalist Paul Johnson wrote that Rhodes had been falsely smeared by the programme, commenting: "In nine tendentious hours, Rhodes is to be presented as a corrupt and greedy money-grabber, a racist and paedophile, whose disgusting passion was to get his hands on young boys ... the BBC has spent £10m of our money putting together a farrago of exaggerations and smears about this great man." Peter Godwin said of the film that "it feels like a work overwhelmingly informed by malice, consistently seizing on the very worst interpretation of the man without really attempting to get under his skin. Rhodes was no 19th-century Hitler. He wasn't so much a freak as a man of his time."
- Rhodes features prominently in Wilbur Smith's Ballantyne series of novels, fictional stories set amongst real events in Rhodes's lifetime.

== See also ==
- Statue of Cecil Rhodes, Bulawayo, Zimbabwe
- Statue of Cecil Rhodes, Company's Garden, South Africa
- Rhodesia (region)

Political offices
Preceded by Sir John Gordon Sprigg	Prime Minister of the Cape Colony; 1890–1896	Succeeded by Sir John Gordon Sprigg
