= Boschendal =

Wine estate in South Africa

Coordinates: 33°52′27″S 18°58′33″E

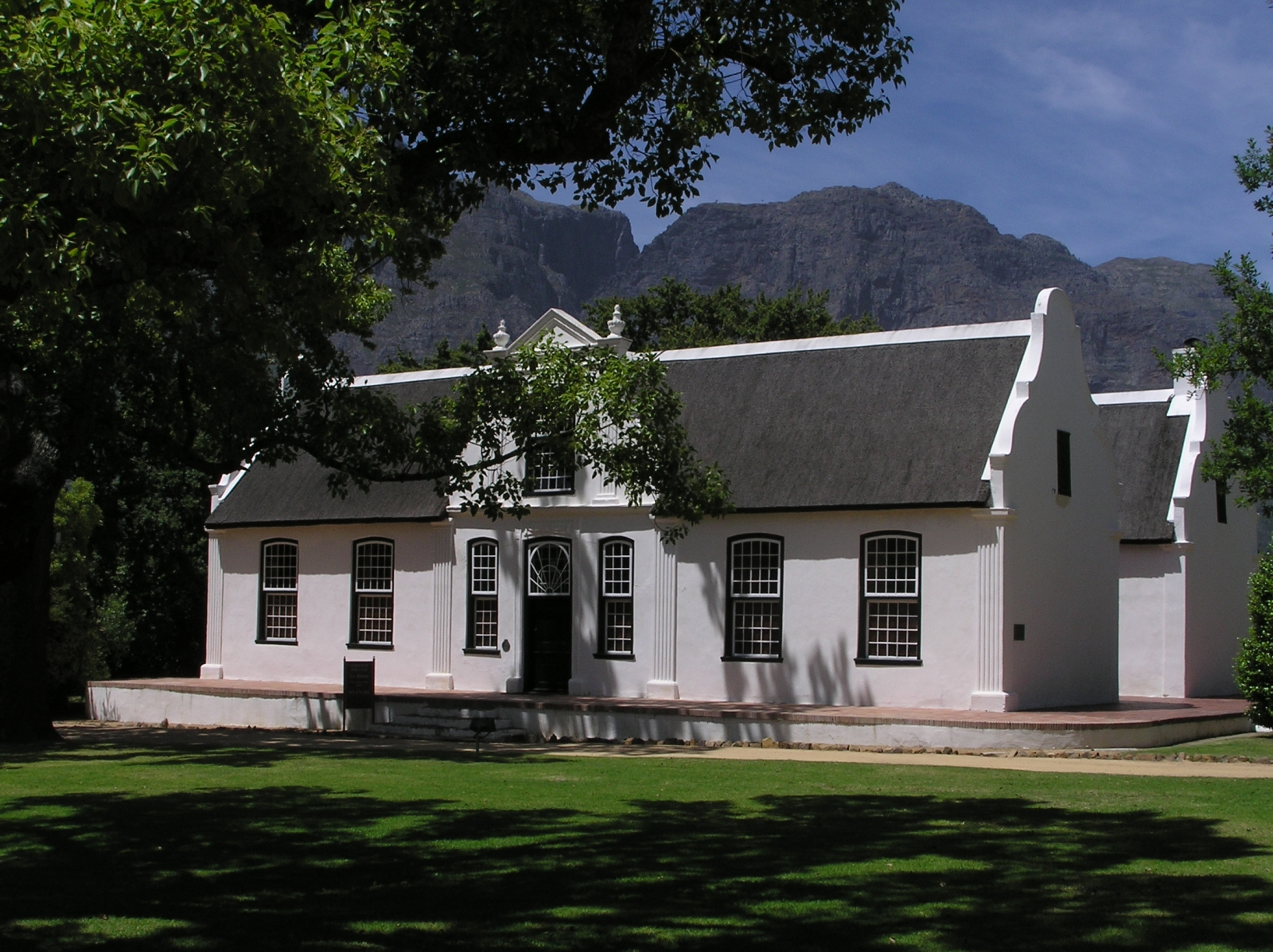
Le Rhone House, one of several early 19th century buildings on the farm in the Cape Dutch style

Boschendal (Dutch: bush and dale) is one of the oldest wine estates in South Africa and is located between Franschhoek and Stellenbosch in South Africa's Western Cape.

== Huguenot Origins ==
The farm's title deeds are dated 1685. The estate's first owner, Jean le Long, was one of the party of 200 French Huguenot refugees who were fleeing religious persecution in Europe. He was granted land in the Cape of Good Hope by the Dutch East India Company in 1688 and the title deed was written in 1713. In 1715 the farm was acquired by another Huguenot, Abraham de Villiers, who sold it to his brother Jacques in 1717. The De Villiers family farmed Boschendal until 1879. In 1812 Paul de Villiers and his wife, Anna Susanna Louw, completed a new house at Boschendal on the site of his father's home. This is the homestead as restored today. Among the guests in the later years of the De Villiers era was the British Governor at the Cape, Sir George Grey, who stayed at Boschendal whenever he visited the region.

== Rhodes Fruit Farms and Anglo-American ==
In 1887 the estate was bought by Cecil Rhodes and formed part of his commercial fruit business, Rhodes Fruit Farms which has become today's Boschendal Farm.

== Phylloxera Epidemic ==
A global phylloxera epidemic, caused by tiny, sap-sucking insects, spread through the Cape vineyards in the 1880s and 1890s, destroying the vines of the Boschendal area in 1890. It caused much damage and led to a farming depression before resistant American vine stocks were introduced on a scale wide enough to stop the epidemic.

In the meantime, farmers needed alternative forms of agriculture, and the lucrative fruit industry in California provided a suitable model for the Cape. Pioneering work was done by fruit farmers in Wellington and the Hex River Valley. In 1892, shipping magnate Percy Molteno developed and introduced refrigerated cargo space on Union-Castle shipping lines, between the Cape and the largest consumer markets in Europe, which revolutionized the industry and made the export of fresh fruit an attractive proposition.

== Rhodes & Pickstone ==
Harry Pickstone, an Englishman with experience of growing fruit in California, convinced Rhodes that a commercial nursery was needed to propagate new varieties of fruit trees for the industry. Rhodes financed his first venture, the Pioneer Fruit Growing Company.

Rhodes's political career had seen him rise to Prime Minister of the Cape Colony. When he was implicated in the Jameson Raid, an unsuccessful attempt to overthrow the Boer Republic in the Transvaal, he was left with little option but to resign. In 1896 Rhodes decided to invest further in fruit farming. Pickstone advised him to buy old wine farms in the Groot Drakenstein, Wellington and Stellenbosch areas.

In March 1897 Rhodes secured the first of more than 20 farms, including Boschendal and Rhone. Twelve young managers were appointed, many of whom had been trained in California. Under Pickstone's tutelage they transformed the farms, introducing modern methods of pruning, grafting and irrigation, and training farm workers in the new skills. They planted 200 000 deciduous fruit trees - pears, apricots, plums and peaches.

In its new incarnation as Boschendal - The Estate, the former "Rhodes Fruit Farms" continues to be a major source of employment for local communities.

== Boschendal - The Estate ==
The Boschendal estate is crowned by the original Cape Dutch manor house, which is open to visitors, together with associated wine tasting venues, restaurants and outbuildings and visitor attractions.

In the late 1960s the estate was taken over by the Anglo American Corporation, before being sold in 2003 to a consortium of international investors, led by the property developer Clive Venning. In 2012 the estate was sold to a consortium of South African investors who began an intensive rejuvenation and agricultural programme.

== The Wines ==
The vineyards at Boschendal cover 2.54 km^{2} between Groot Drakenstein and Simonsberg, and include substantial plantings of Chardonnay and Sauvignon blanc, together with recent plantings of Cabernet Sauvignon, Merlot and Shiraz. The winery is noted particularly for its complex white wines.

When Anglo American took ownership of Rhodes Fruit Farms and Boschendal in 1969 one of the key projects was the re-establishment of a range of wines under the Boschendal brand. In 1978, Achim van Arnim took charge as Cellarmaster, vowing to restore pre-eminence for the Estate's produce.

It was then that "Blanc de Noir" ( white from black) was created — a "blush" white wine made from red grapes, an innovation that sets Boschendal Wines apart.

== See also ==
- Huguenots in South Africa
- Cecil John Rhodes
- Herbert Baker
- Rhodes Fruit Farms
- Paarl
- Stellenbosch
