= Glen Grey Act =

1894 British Cape Colony forced labour law

In the colonial history of South Africa, the Glen Grey Act was an 1894 Act of the Parliament of the Cape Colony. Instigated by the government of Prime Minister Cecil John Rhodes, it established a system of individual (rather than communal) land tenure and created a labour tax to force Xhosa men into employment on commercial farms or in industry. The act was so named because, although it was later extended to a larger area, it initially applied only in the Glen Grey district, a former name for the area around Lady Frere, east of Queenstown, in the Eastern Cape province of South Africa.

The Glen Grey district became part of the Transkei within which it was named Cacadu district (not to be confused with the former Cacadu District Municipality, now the Sarah Baartman District Municipality, further west) and is now the magisterial district of Lady Frere. It is part of the Western Thembuland traditional kingdom.

== See also ==
- Natives Land Act, 1913
- Land reform in South Africa
