= Rhodes Fruit Farms =

Rhodes Fruit Farms, founded by Cecil John Rhodes in 1902, exists today as Boschendal The Estate, one of the oldest wine estates in South Africa.

== Founding of Rhodes Fruit Farms ==
Mining magnate, politician and empire-builder Cecil John Rhodes founded Rhodes Fruit Farms in South Africa in 1902, shortly before his death. Much of his activity centred on the farm Boschendal, which has given its name to the current Boschendal Estate. To this day it is a major source of employment for the local community.

== Location ==
Close to Cape Town, between Stellenbosch, Pniel, Franschhoek and Paarl, Boschendal stretches between the foot of the Groot Drakenstein mountains to the Simonsberg mountains, with views of the mountain, vineyards and valley below. On 2,240 hectares (5,500 acres) there is a unique combination of vineyards, orchards, nature reserves, mountain corridors and rivers. The historic homesteads on the Estate, part of the Cape Dutch heritage, are Boschendal Manor House, Goede Hoop, Rhone, Nieuwedorp, Old Bethlehem, Champagne and the Cecil John Rhodes Cottage.

== Phylloxera Epidemic ==
In the late nineteenth century, it was tragedy which gave birth to opportunity. The Western Cape wine farms had been devastated by a phylloxera epidemic in the 1880s & 1890s. Diseased vineyards were ploughed up and gradually replanted with vines grafted onto resistant American rootstock. In the meantime, farmers needed alternative forms of agriculture and the lucrative fruit industry in California provided a suitable model for the Cape. Pioneering work was done by fruit farmers in Wellington and the Hex River Valley. In 1892, shipping magnate Percy Molteno developed and introduced refrigerated cargo space on Union-Castle shipping lines, between the Cape and the largest consumer markets in Europe, which revolutionised the industry and made the export of fresh fruit an attractive proposition.

== Rhodes & Pickstone ==
Harry Pickstone, an Englishman who had experience growing fruit in California, landed in the Cape in 1892. He convinced Rhodes that a commercial nursery was needed to propagate new varieties of fruit trees for the industry. Rhodes financed his first venture, the Pioneer Fruit Growing Company.

After retiring from politics in 1896 Rhodes decided to invest further in fruit farming. Pickstone advised him to buy old wine farms in the Groot Drakenstein, Wellington and Stellenbosch areas.

In March 1897 Rhodes secured the first of more than 20 farms, including Boschendal and Rhone. Twelve young managers from South Africa, Britain and America were appointed; many of them had been trained in California. Under Pickstone's tutelage they transformed the farms, introducing modern methods of pruning, grafting and irrigation, and training farm workers in the new skills. They planted 200,000 deciduous fruit trees – pears, apricots, plums and peaches.

This rapid expansion and Rhodes' use of his fortune to buy out smaller farmers led to some opposition. He was condemned for a "monopolistic" policy but rode out the storm.

Pickstone set up offices at Lekkerwijn where Rhodes, Kipling and others were visitors. Rhodes was keen to have his own retreat and commissioned Sir Herbert Baker to build him a simple cottage. Baker also designed two churches in the area and a village for workers at Languedoc.

== Anglo-Boer War ==
Relations between Britain and the Boer republics deteriorated and led to the outbreak of war in 1899. Rhodes immediately left for Kimberley, the centre of his diamond interests and remained there during the four-month siege. He continued to attend to fruit farming matters and persuaded the mining magnate, Alfred Beit and De Beers to become shareholders, to ensure continuing financial strength for the project. Rhodes's health deteriorated and on his return to the Cape he withdrew to his cottage in Muizenberg. In February 1902, as Rhodes was dying, a new company, Rhodes Fruit Farms Ltd, was born. The day before Rhodes died, Pickstone was appointed technical director to the company and resident director at Groot Drakenstein.

== The De Beers era ==
De Beers, Sir Alfred Beit and the Rhodes Estate became joint share-holders of Rhodes Fruit Farms with Dr Leander Starr Jameson (of Jameson Raid fame) was chairman. Pickstone ran the company for another two years before returning to his nursery business. By then the railway was extended to Groot Drakenstein and trains were fitted with refrigeration cars for the distribution of fruit. Rhodes Fruit Farms became the industry leader and a major source of employment locally. It opened a cannery in 1903 and a jam factory in 1906.

After Sir Alfred Beit's death in 1906, De Beers bought Beit and Rhodes's shares. Returns were never high and in 1927 De Beers ordered an investigation into its fruit-farming operations. They appointed one of the consultants, Alfred Appleyard from the University of Bristol, as general manager. He held the position for 22 years and consolidated the company's holdings: selling off the Wellington farms and acquiring Excelsior and Bien Donné in Groot Drakenstein.

== Sir Abe Bailey ==
In 1937 De Beers decided to sell Rhodes Fruit Farms and it was bought by Sir Abe Bailey, three years before his death. He was an old associate of Rhodes with gold-mining interests and had been involved in the Jameson Raid. During Bailey's short interlude as owner, Appleyard remained in charge of the fruit farms and lived at Goede Hoop.

== Syndicate ==
In 1941, a syndicate of businessmen bought Rhodes Fruit Farms from Bailey's estate. They were A.B. McDonald, E.J. Crean, S.T. Richards, G.H. Starck, and later Frank Robb. The Directors and their families spent many holidays at Rhodes Cottage.

John Manning, the new general manager, built a new cannery in 1951, a sawmill in 1953 and purchased the farm, Bethlehem, in Groot Drakenstein. Rhodes Fruit Farms retained only one farm in Stellenbosch, namely Vredenburg. This was sold in the late 1960s and is now a suburb called Die Boord (Afrikaans : the orchard).

== Anglo-American Corporation ==
In 1969, Frank Robb persuaded Anglo-American, De Beers and Rand Selection Corporation Ltd to become majority shareholders in Rhodes Fruit Farms. The company decided to restore Boschendal and revive wine farming under the Boschendal brand name. The complex was restored by the architect, Gawie Fagan, and opened to the public in 1976. The company changed its name to Anglo-American Farms.

Anglo American started divesting itself of the cannery, dairy, piggeries and its fruit interests in the late 1990s, eventually selling off all the lands along the Berg and Dwars Rivers.

== Boschendal Ltd ==
In 2004 a private consortium, under the leadership of property developer Clive Venning, bought Boschendal.

The 600 hectare, 17th Century Boschendal Estate is sectioned into 18 Founders' Estates between 21 and 44 hectares each. The Goede Hoop Homestead, built by Pieter Hendrik de Villiers in 1821 graces – Estate 17. On Estate 19 stands the historic Rhodes Cottage, designed and constructed in 1902 as a country retreat for mining magnate and empire builder by Sir Herbert Baker, the dominant force in South African architecture for two decades.

Boschendal The Estate continues to be a major source of employment for local communities and the development of Boschendal will generate R 100 million for investment in the local community projects such as nutrition and health, education and skills development, agricultural, heritage and environmental support. The consortium has donated 270 hectares of land to the community trust.

== See also ==
- Huguenots in South Africa
- Cecil John Rhodes
- Herbert Baker
- Boschendal
