= Malindidzimu =

National historical monument in Zimbabwe

Coordinates: 20.49383°S 28.51416°E

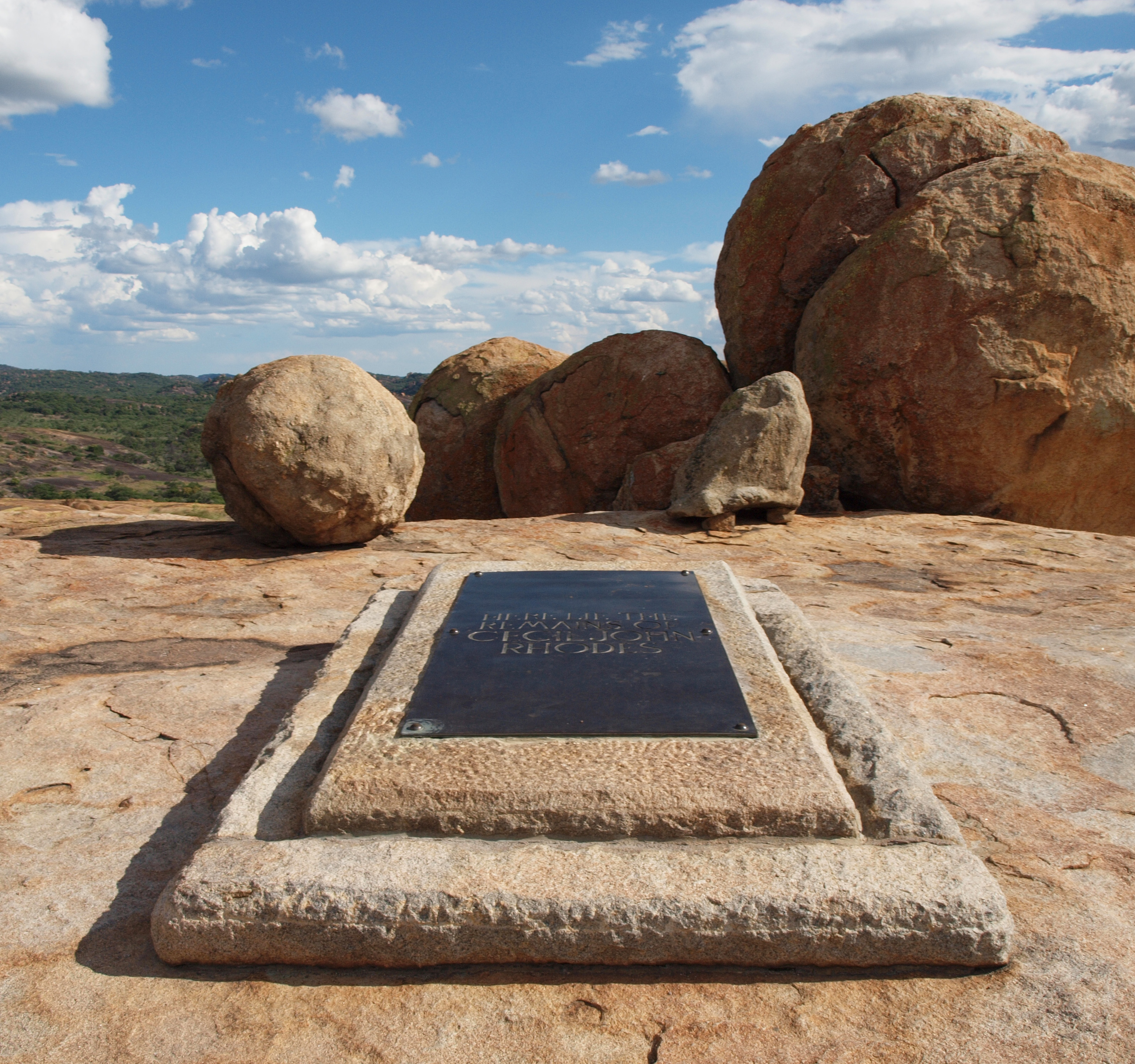
Cecil Rhodes' tomb

Malindidzimu ("Hill of the Ancestral Spirits" in Kalanga) is a granite inselberg and a national historical monument situated in the Matobo National Park in south-west Zimbabwe, c. 40 kilometers south of Bulawayo. It is considered a sacred place by nationalists and indigenous groups as a shrine to the Shona supreme deity Mwari.

Cecil Rhodes is buried on the summit of Malindidzimu, together with Sir Charles Coghlan, Sir Leander Starr Jameson, Allan Wilson and several other white settlers. Traditional Shona kingdoms were theocratic, and Rhodes' request to be buried there has been interpreted as a gesture of colonial triumph and conquest over indigenous Africans and their religious belief systems.

The English name of the site is "World's View" which is not to be confused with World's View, Nyanga.
