= Shangani Patrol (disambiguation) =

The Shangani Patrol was a patrol of the British South Africa Company that was ambushed by Matabele warriors in 1893.

Shangani Patrol may also refer to:

- Shangani Patrol (film), a 1970 war film
  - Shangani Patrol (soundtrack album)
