= Allan Stewart (artist) =

Scottish painter (1865–1951)

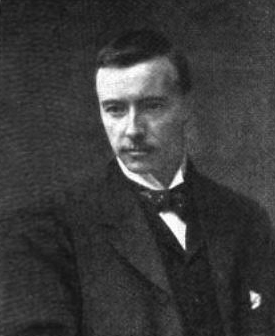
- Born: 11 February 1865; Edinburgh, Scotland
- Died: 29 January 1951 (aged 85); St John's Town of Dalry, Scotland
- Education: Royal Scottish Academy
- Occupation: Painter

Allan Stewart (February 11, 1865 – January 29, 1951) was a Scottish painter who built his reputation on romantic, historical and particularly military paintings as well as landscapes and portraits.

== Life and work ==
Born in Edinburgh on 11 February 1865, his father being the postmaster at Leith, Stewart was educated at the Edinburgh Institution. He studied art at the Royal Scottish Academy Schools where he was awarded several prizes, and also in Spain and France.

He showed paintings at the RSA, at the Royal Academy, at Glasgow and Liverpool, and at other provincial exhibitions. The paintings included a number depicting military events, including To the memory of brave men: The last stand of Major Allan Wilson at the Shangani, 4 December 1893, exhibited in 1896, The Mazoe relief, June 1896, an incident in the Matabele Rebellion in 1899, and in the following year, The Charge of the 21st Lancers at Omdurman. Another contemporary battle scene by Stewart was The Charge of the Gordon Highlanders at Dargai painted in 1898 and exhibited at the Fine Art Society.

In his paintings of contemporary military scenes, he often called upon veterans who had been present at the actions. For his painting of Rally the Greys for instance, he interviewed veterans of the battle then living in Edinburgh, one of whom lent the artist a rare shell jacket worn during the charge. Others provided him with photographs of some of the officers and copies of letters. When Stewart began work on his painting of Dargai, he was assisted by Lieut.-General William Dick-Cunyngham. Besides his oil paintings, he also illustrated many books on travel including works on Ceylon and British North Borneo, and history.

Stewart served on the staff of the Illustrated London News for a number of years and in this capacity, went to South Africa as a "special" artist during the Boer War. One picture from this period was The Yorkshire Regiment and New Zealanders repulsing the Boers near Colesberg, Cape Colony. He also accompanied King Edward VII on his Mediterranean tours During the First World War, He served as a captain in the Royal Engineers and for some time was attached to the Australian and American forces. Two of his paintings of the war are The Charge of the Scots Greys at Quenlin and The road back, Templeux-le-Guérard, 30 September 1918.

He worked at Kenley, Surrey until around 1925 before moving to Rose Cottage in St John's Town of Dalry near Castle Douglas, Kirkcudbrightshire, where he died on 29 January 1951, aged 85 leaving his wife and three children. He is buried in Dalry Churchyard.

== Paintings ==
- Queen Mary going to her execution
- Prince Charles's Last look at Scotland
- The last stand of Rajputs
- Royal Company of Archers (portrait group) Holyrood Palace, Edinburgh)
- "Rally the Greys!" Balaklava, 25 October 1854 (1895 – Royal Scots Dragoon Guards)
- To the Memory of Brave Men: The Last Stand of Major Allan Wilson at the Shangani, 4 December 1893 (1896 – Bulawayo Museum, Rhodesia (today Zimbabwe))
- To the Memory of Brave Men: The Last Stand of Major Allan Wilson at the Shangani, 4 December 1893 (1896 – Russell-Cotes Art Gallery & Museum, Bournemouth)
- The Charge of the Gordon Highlanders at Dargai (1898 – 48th Highlanders of Canada Officer's Mess, Toronto)
- The Charge of the 21st Lancers at Omdurman (1899 – Cavalry & Guards Club, London)
- A royal fugitive, 1746 (1906)
- The Charge of the Scots Greys at Quenlin
- The Road Back, Templeaux-Le-Guérard, 30 September 1918 (1925 – Australian War Memorial, Canberra)
