= Texas Jack Jr. =

Ran an international Wild West show

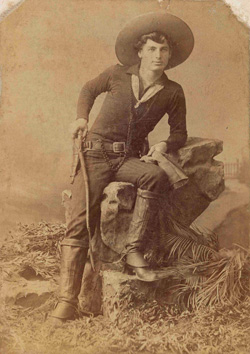
Texas Jack Jr.

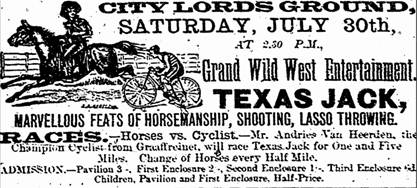
Advertisement for the Texas Jack Wild West show, Graham's Town, South Africa, 23 July 1898

Texas Jack Jr. (c. 1860 – 1905), who adopted the name of his rescuer and childhood protector, Texas Jack Omohundro, ran an international traveling Wild West Show and Circus.

== Background ==
Not long after the American Civil War, while driving a herd of cattle to northern markets, Texas Jack Omohundro found two small girls and a five-year-old boy who had been orphaned when their parents were attacked and killed by Native Americans. Omohundro escorted the children to safety, and provided for their care. The boy took to calling himself Texas Jack Jr. (Note: Note: He dropped the 'Junior' suffix in later years, after Omohundro's death (1880).)

== Wild west show ==
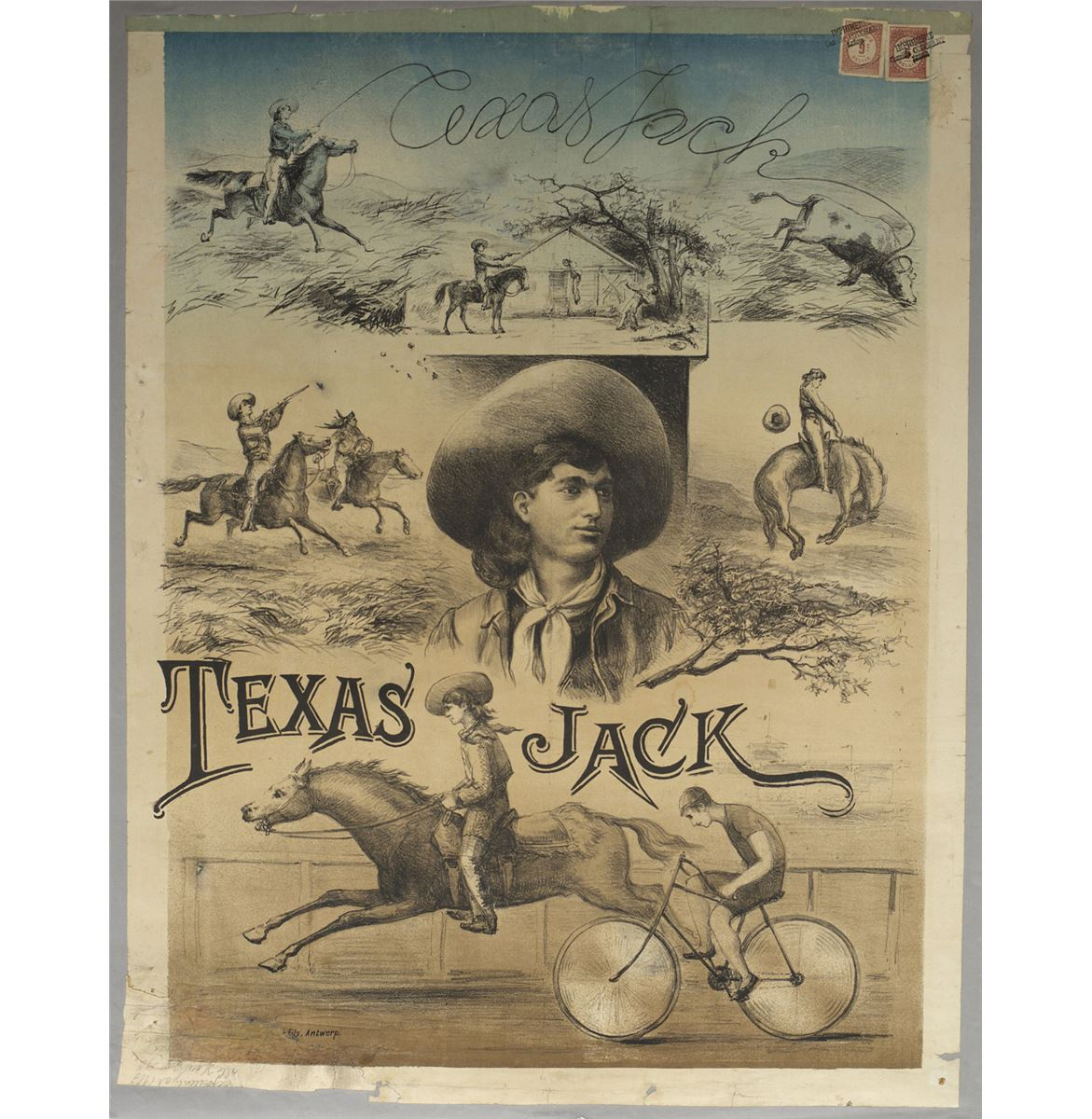
Texas Jack Jr. show Advertising poster

Texas Jack was a sharpshooter and trick rider in shows around the world, especially South Africa. He helped Will Rogers get a start as an entertainer by offering him a part in his traveling show in 1902. Will Rogers approached Jack hoping to get a job wrangling the horses or setting tents. When Jack asked him if he could do a rope trick, Rogers obliged and was hired as an entertainer on the spot.

By 1899 he was in England with a show called "Savage South Africa". The show included a historical re-enactment of the 1893 Shangani Patrol, a last stand of 34 white soldiers against an overwhelming number of Ndebele warriors, with Jack starring as Frederick Russell Burnham, the American chief of scouts who was one of only three survivors of the battle. The re-enactment was filmed and released as a war movie entitled Major Wilson's Last Stand that same year. A couple of years later he returned to South Africa and started "Texas Jack's Wild West Show & Circus."

== Death ==
Texas Jack died in Kroonstad, South Africa, in 1905. He was survived by his common-law wife, Lyle (or Lil) Marr, who was also a sharpshooter in his show.

== See also ==
- List of Wild West shows
