= Peter Lobengula =

South African performer, d. 1913

Peter Kushana Lobengula (died 24 November 1913) was a South African actor and circus performer who gained considerable attention in Britain during the early 20th-century, claiming to be a prince and the son of Lobengula, the last King of the Matabele. He was one of the performers at Frank Fillis's 'Savage South Africa' show at Earl's Court in 1899. His romance and subsequent marriage to a white woman, Kitty Jewell caused a sensation at the time. He portrayed his father in the film Major Wilson's Last Stand. His engagement to Florence 'Kitty' Jewell, a white British woman, ignited public scandal and was widely sensationalized by the press, marking an early instance of tabloid journalism's influential role in shaping and echoing British imperialistic attitudes. He spent his later life working as a miner in Salford, England and died there in 1913.
