= Orange Free State Bantu F.C =

First Black soccer club from South Africs to tour Europe

Orange Free State Bantu Football Club was the first Black South African football team to tour and play in Europe. The team made history by playing about 50 matches in England, France, Ireland, Scotland, and Wales.

== History ==
Football in South Africa was introduced mainly due to the discovery of diamonds and gold in the latter half of the 19th century, and it was made popular by the British military, who were stationed in South Africa during the Anglo-Zulu War and the First Boer War in the late 1870s and early 1880s.

Oranje Free State Bantu F.C. was founded in the late 1890s in Bloemfontein, today the Free State province of South Africa by the whites-only Orange Free State Football Association. The team consisted of entirely Black South Africans, with M.D. "Toffy" Roberts, Lionel Nathan, Percy Day and Arthur Moss as the only white settlers on the team because of their active involvement in the footballing community.

== European tour ==
In September 1899, the Oranje Free State Bantu F.C. left from Cape Town,South Africa for Southampton in Europe on the Union Steamship Company vessel called the SS Gaika. The team arrived at the time of the largest African exhibition ever held in London, organized by circus owner Frank Fillis. Over two hundred Africans and dozens of Afrikaners were brought to London to re-enact battles, songs, and dances in front of paying crowds at Earl's Court, and the team was mistaken to be part of the exhibition.

Led by captain Joseph Twayi, the Orange Free State Bantu F.C. lost their first match 6-3 at St. James’ Park in front of a crowd of around 6,000. The next evening they faced a second division side of, Sunderland at Roker Park, where they were defeated. On Saturday, October 7, 1899, the Orange Free State touring side faced Leicester Fosse, where they were defeated 7-3. On the eve of the Second Anglo-Boer War, also known as the South African War of 1899-1902, the team faced Nottingham Forest F.C. and declared their loyalty to the Queen. Later in November they played with Aston Villa F.C. at a match that brought a crowd of around 4,000 together.

== Aftermath ==
Out of their 49 fixtures during their tour in Europe, Orange Free State Bantu F.C. only managed one win against a French side, SC Tourcoing. The last match fixture was on 2nd January 1900 against Aberdare F.C. in Wales. Throughout their tour, the team was faced with racism and were called Kaffirs in many news reports. In later years, the team captain, Joseph Twayi became the general treasurer of the SANNC, later to be known as the African National Congress.
