= Allan Wilson (army officer) =

Scottish-born army officer (1856–1893)

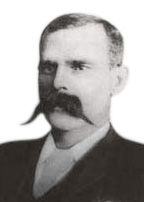
- Born: 1856; Glen Urquhart, Scotland
- Died: 4 December 1893 (aged 36–37); Shangani River, Rhodesia
- Burial place: Matopos Hills, Rhodesia
- Military career
- Allegiance: Cape Colony
- Branch: Cape Colonial Forces
- Service years: 1877–1893
- Rank: Major
- Units: Frontier Armed & Mounted Police; Cape Mounted Rifles
- Commands: Victoria Column
- Conflicts: Xhosa Wars: Gaika-Galeka campaign; Morosi campaign; First Matabele War: Shangani Patrol †
- Awards: South Africa Medal; British South Africa Company Medal

Major Allan Wilson (1856 – 4 December 1893) was a Scottish-born army officer. He is best known for his leadership of the Shangani Patrol in the First Matabele War. His death fighting overwhelming odds made him a national hero in Britain and Rhodesia.

== Early life ==
Wilson was born in Scotland. Upon completion of his apprenticeship at a Fochabers bank, he went to the Cape Colony and joined the Cape Mounted Rifles. Wilson served as a Trooper in the Frontier Armed & Mounted Police during the Gaika-Galeka Campaign from 1877 to 1878 and in the Morosi Campaign of 1879. He was awarded the South Africa Medal with clasps 1877-8-9. He transferred to the Cape Mounted Rifles and was promoted to Sergeant. After taking his discharge he became a trader and gold prospector, and he earned a commission in the Basuto Police. Later he joined the Bechuanaland Exploration Company as Chief Inspector and was sent as their representative to Fort Victoria (now Masvingo) in Matabeleland, serving as the senior officer in the Victoria Volunteers, reaching the rank of major.

== Shangani Patrol ==
When the First Matabele War broke out, Wilson was given command of the Victoria Column and appointed the rank of major. He led the Shangani Patrol in search of King Lobengula and, on 4 December 1893, he and 36 of his men were cut off from the main column and killed by the Ndebele warriors. In desperation and only hours before his defeat, Wilson sent Frederick Russell Burnham and two other scouts to seek reinforcements from the main column commanded by Major Patrick Forbes. The battle raging there was just as intense and there was no hope of anyone reaching Wilson in time. The incident achieved a lasting, prominent place in Rhodesian colonial history and is considered to be roughly the British equivalent to Custer's Last Stand.

Wilson is buried, along with most of his patrol and with Cecil Rhodes, in Matabo Hills, Zimbabwe. He was considered a national hero and one of the founding fathers of Rhodesia. The date of his death was a Rhodesian national holiday.

== Wilson's Last Stand ==
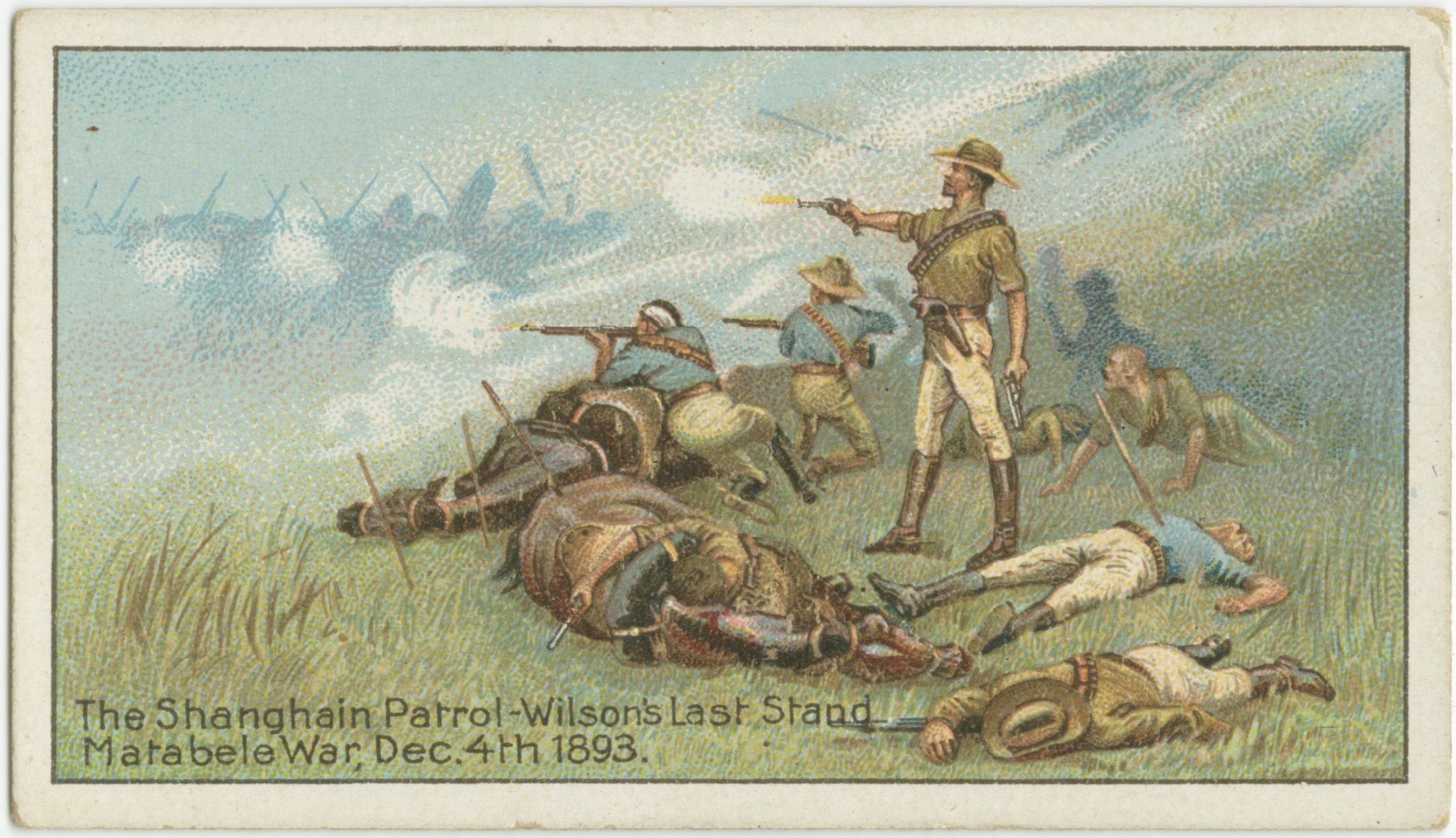
A cigarette card depicting "Wilson's Last Stand"

A patriotic play by Augustus Harris called Cheer, Boys, Cheer! was performed in London's Drury Lane theatre in 1895, running for 177 performances. Its climax was "Wilson's Last Stand", a reenactment of Wilson's death. In the play, based on some embellished facts, it is said that in the killing of Wilson and his thirty-three men, Lobengula lost 80 of his royal guard and another 500 Ndebele warriors. Wilson was the last to fall and the wounded men of the Shangani Patrol loaded rifles and passed them to him during the final stages of the defence. When their ammunition ran out, the remaining men of the Patrol are said to have risen and sung "God Save the Queen". Once both of Wilson’s arms were broken and he could no longer shoot, he stepped from behind a barricade of dead horses, walked toward the Ndebele, and was stabbed with a spear by a young warrior. A rescue party, led by "a plucky girl", arrived just too late.

The Last Stand was re-enacted once more at the 1899 Greater Britain Exhibition in London, which featured a play called Savage South Africa, described as "A Vivid, Realistic and Picturesque Representation of Life in the Wilds of Africa", in which scenes from the Matabele wars were re-created. A film called Major Wilson’s Last Stand, based on the play, was produced in 1899. Robert Baden-Powell in his Scouting for Boys advised scoutmasters to put on patriotic plays, giving "Wilson's Last Stand" as one of the suitable subjects. A docudrama by David Millin, Shangani Patrol, was released in 1970. The film was based on the book A Time To Die (1968) by Robert Cary, and was made on location by RPM Film Studios. It stars Brian O'Shaughnessy as Major Allan Wilson and co-stars Will Hutchins as Fred Burnham.

== Literature ==
- History of Rhodesia, by Howard Hensman (1900) -- the full-text of the book can be found online for free PDF
- Scouting on Two Continents, by Major Frederick Russell Burnham, D.S.O., Autobiography. LC call number: DT775 .B8 1926. (1926)
