= Shangani Patrol (soundtrack) =

Soundtrack album by RPM Studio Orchestra
- Released: 1970
- Recorded: 1970
- Genre: Pop
- Length: 27:30
- Label: RPM
- Producer: Mike Hankinson

Shangani Patrol is the soundtrack to the 1970 film Shangani Patrol. It was released in 1970 and was performed by the RPM Studio Orchestra, composed and conducted by Mike Hankinson, and recorded in RPM Studios Johannesburg, South Africa, by Geoff Tucker. Conducted by the composer Michael Hankinson with a session orchestra. A notable member of this group of musicians was trumpeter Eddie Calvert - also known in England as "The man with the golden horn". Part of the proceeds from the sale of this album were donated to Brandwag Fund/Fond comforts for border troops. The film was based on the true story of the Shangani Patrol.

== Track listing ==
1. "Overture" - 2:00
2. "Title Music" (Shangani Patrol theme music) by Dan Hill and Mike Hankinson - 3:28
3. "Matopos" - 0:42
4. "Boarder Battle" - 1:20
5. "Poem" - 1:13
6. "Leaving Fort Victoria" - 1:09
7. "Ringing Rocks" - 1:38
8. "Under Attack" - 2:28
9. "Jameson's Arrival" - 0:54
10. "Diary" - 2:00
11. "Stampede" - 1:51
12. "Ambush and Escape" - 2:13
13. "Call for Reinforcements" - 2:00
14. "Night Watch" - 1:20
15. "Royal Spear (Matabele Chant)" - 1:30
16. "Last Stand" - 2:00
17. "To Brave Men" - 0:57
