= Shangani Patrol (film) =

- DVD Jacket
- Directed by: David Millin
- Screenplay by: Adrian Steed
- Story by: "A Time to Die" (book), by Robert Cary (1968)
- Based on: Historical events of the Shangani Patrol (1893)
- Produced by: Roscoe Behrmann
- Starring: Brian O'Shaughnessy as Maj. Allan Wilson; Will Hutchins as Chief of Scouts Frederick Russell Burnham
- Cinematography: Lionel Friedberg
- Edited by: Antony Gibbs
- Music by: Mike Hankinson; Dan Hill; RPM Studio Orchestra
- Production company: RPM Film Studios
- Distributed by: Rhodesian Broadcasting Corporation
- Release date: 3 December 1970
- Running time: 90 min.
- Country: Rhodesia
- Language: English

Shangani Patrol is a war film based upon the non-fiction book A Time to Die by Robert Cary (1968), and the historical accounts of the Shangani Patrol, with Brian O'Shaughnessy as Major Allan Wilson and Will Hutchins as the lead Scout Frederick Russell Burnham. Also includes the song "Shangani Patrol" by Nick Taylor (1966 recording).

Under the command of Major Wilson, the patrol tracks the fleeing Ndebele King Lobengula across the Shangani River. Cut off from the main force, they are ambushed by the Ndebele impi and, except for the few men sent as reinforcements, all are killed. Such was the bravery of the Shangani Patrol that the victorious Ndebele said, "They were men of men and their fathers were men before them." Depending on one's viewpoint, this event was one of the great mistakes and military blunders of this time in history, or the last heroic stand of a gallant few. The incident had lasting significance in England, South Africa, and Rhodesia as the equivalent of 'Custer's Last Stand'. This is their story, told in a 1970 film shot on location in Matabeleland, Rhodesia (now Zimbabwe).

== Plot ==
Locale, Mashonaland, Southern Rhodesia, 1893. The British South Africa Company (BSAC) is based in the encampment of Fort Victoria (now known as Masvingo). The film starts with a sepia toned trial of two AWOL volunteers and later deserters who were eventually court martialed by the army for stealing gold which was given to them by Matabele warriors on behalf of King Lobengula as a peace offering to end the war. In this trial (which is solely represented by archive drawings and voice-overs) the voice of TV anchor man/journalist Adrian Steed is heard as the judge (later to be seen as Major Forbes) and that of Stuart Brown playing Dr Leander Starr Jameson.

The film then cuts to a glorious sunset shot of Southern Rhodesia where the camp is situated. After a sentimental encounter between the leader Allan Wilson and his wife May, in which Wilson professes the fervent wish to procreate with his wife in order to produce pioneer Rhodesians, it cuts to the titles of the film, all based on scenes from the film. The horrific and ultimately unavoidable slaughter of the Patrol is included. Fort Victoria has a serious problem; it is surrounded by hordes of menacing Matabele warriors, one of whom demands the release of the Shona people under the protection of the BSAC and promises that his warriors will kill them in the bush and not in the Shangani River so as not to dirty the water.

The BSAC re-group and under orders from Dr. Jameson, are to pursue King Lobengula’s troops all the way down from Fort Salisbury to the south of Rhodesia, at that time the kingdom of Lobengula, to capture King Lobengula and hold him to ransom. Wilson leads his troops on what has become a heroic but ultimately futile quest to capture the King in the hope that his troops will surrender. One by one, the volunteers begin showing signs of their inexperience and sometimes lack of courage. One even loses his nerve, runs away and is shot while fleeing. Eventually, with ammunition and morale running low, Wilson dispatches Burnham back to the fort to alert Major Forbes that reinforcements are required. After much argument, Burnham complies and the Shangani Patrol is minus another volunteer.

Burnham alerts Major Forbes to the peril that the Patrol is in. Forbes refuses to back his troops up. The Patrol is eliminated by the Ndebele after Wilson fires his remaining bullet. He and the party are killed by the Matabele, who then praise the 34 men of the Shangani Patrol as being "men of men".

The final slaughter of the vanquished is shown in quick fire frame flashes (almost like still pictures) and with no sound, right up until the moment when the Matabele induna screams "Touch not their bodies! They were men of men and their fathers were men before them!" The last scene is of Burnham visiting the burial and monument to the Shangani Patrol at Matopo Hills.

== Primary cast ==
Actor	Role
Brian O'Shaughnessy	Major Allan Wilson
Will Hutchins	Frederick Russell Burnham, the American Scout
Adrian Steed	Major Patrick Forbes
Stuart Brown	Dr. Leander Starr Jameson
Anthea Crosse	May Wilson
Lance Lockhart-Ross	Captain Indy
Ian Yule	Trooper Dillon
Patrick Mynhardt	Hofmeyer

== Production ==
Shangani Patrol was the third film made by South African producers David Millin and Roscoe Behrmann under the newly formed RPM Film Studios. The film was shot entirely on location in Rhodesia, in the Marula district, about sixty miles from Bulawayo and not far from the historical battles of the First Matabele War. Shooting was completed in the scheduled six weeks.

== See also ==
- Shangani Patrol (soundtrack)
- Major Wilson's Last Stand
