= Joseph Twayi =

South African political leader and activist

- Born: 13 February 1873; Bloemfontein
- Died: 29 September 1924 (aged 51); Bloemfontein
- Occupations: Political leader; activist
- Known for: Captain of the Orange Free State Bantu F.C

Joseph B. Twayi, also spelled Tsoai (13 February 1873 – 29 September 1924), was a South African businessman, politician, and sportsman. He was the captain of the Orange Free State football team to tour Europe and later became the treasurer-general of the South African Native National Congress (SANNC), which later became the African National Congress.

== Early life ==
Twayi was born in 1873 in Bloemfontein, the capital of the Boer republic of the Orange Free State. He was a grocery store owner in the Waaihoek township of Bloemfontein, and because of this, he met other Black, like-minded contemporaries who worked as masons, tailors, clerks, and artisans, and they formed a literate, English-speaking middle class of that time.

== Orange Free State Bantu Football Club ==
On 22 February 1895, the Corinthian Football Club from England visited South Africa, and while on tour, the team met Twayi and asked him to organize a team of Black players to play matches in the UK. Twayi established his own club and called it the Oriental Club in 1897. In 1899 Twayi captained the first soccer team of Black players from South Africa that toured the UK and France for four months. The team was called the Orange Free State Bantu F.C. The team received a warm welcome and racism as they were called the Kaffir team throughout their tour by the English media. Out of 50 games played, Twayi's team won only one match against a team from France. While in Europe, the Second Boer War broke out, and Twayi declared the team's loyalty and support to the Queen.

== Politics ==
Once Twayi returned to Bloemfontein, he became deeply involved in politics. He was the founding member of the South African Native National Congress (SANNC) founded in 1912, and officially served as its treasurer by 1915. He also became the "Blockman" of the Native Advisory Board of Bloemfontein, 1913-1923.

== Legacy ==
Tsoai Street in Mangaung, Bloemfontein, is named after him.
