= Will Hutchins =

American actor (1930–2025)

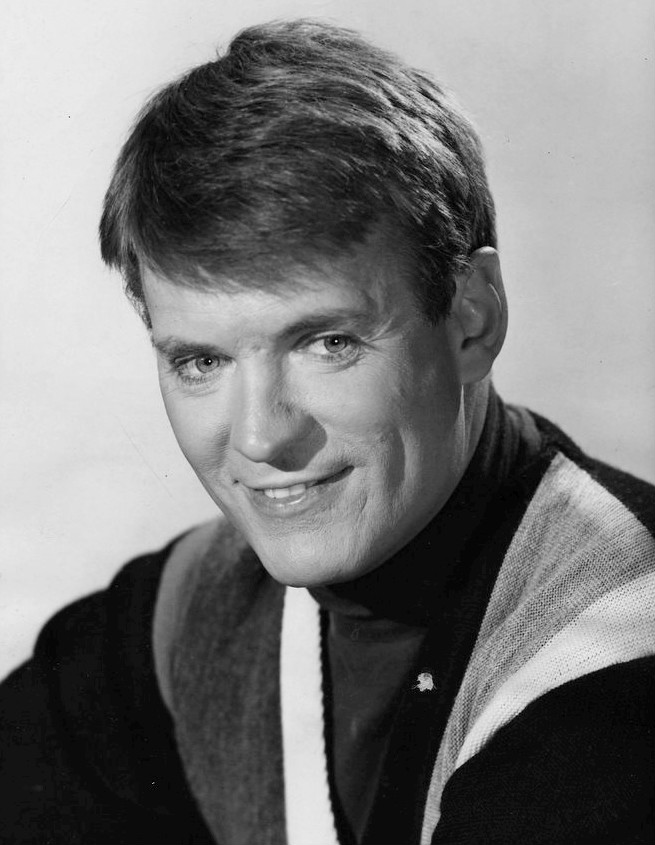
- Hutchins in 1971
- Born: Marshall Lowell Hutchason; May 5, 1930; Los Angeles, California, U.S.
- Died: April 21, 2025 (aged 94); Manhasset, New York, U.S.
- Education: Pomona College
- Occupation: Actor
- Years active: 1941, 1956–2010
- Spouses: Chrissie Burnett (m. 1965; div. 1969) Barbara Torres (m. 1988)
- Awards: Golden Boot Awards (2002); Stone-Waterman Award (2004) – Cincinnati Old Time Radio Convention

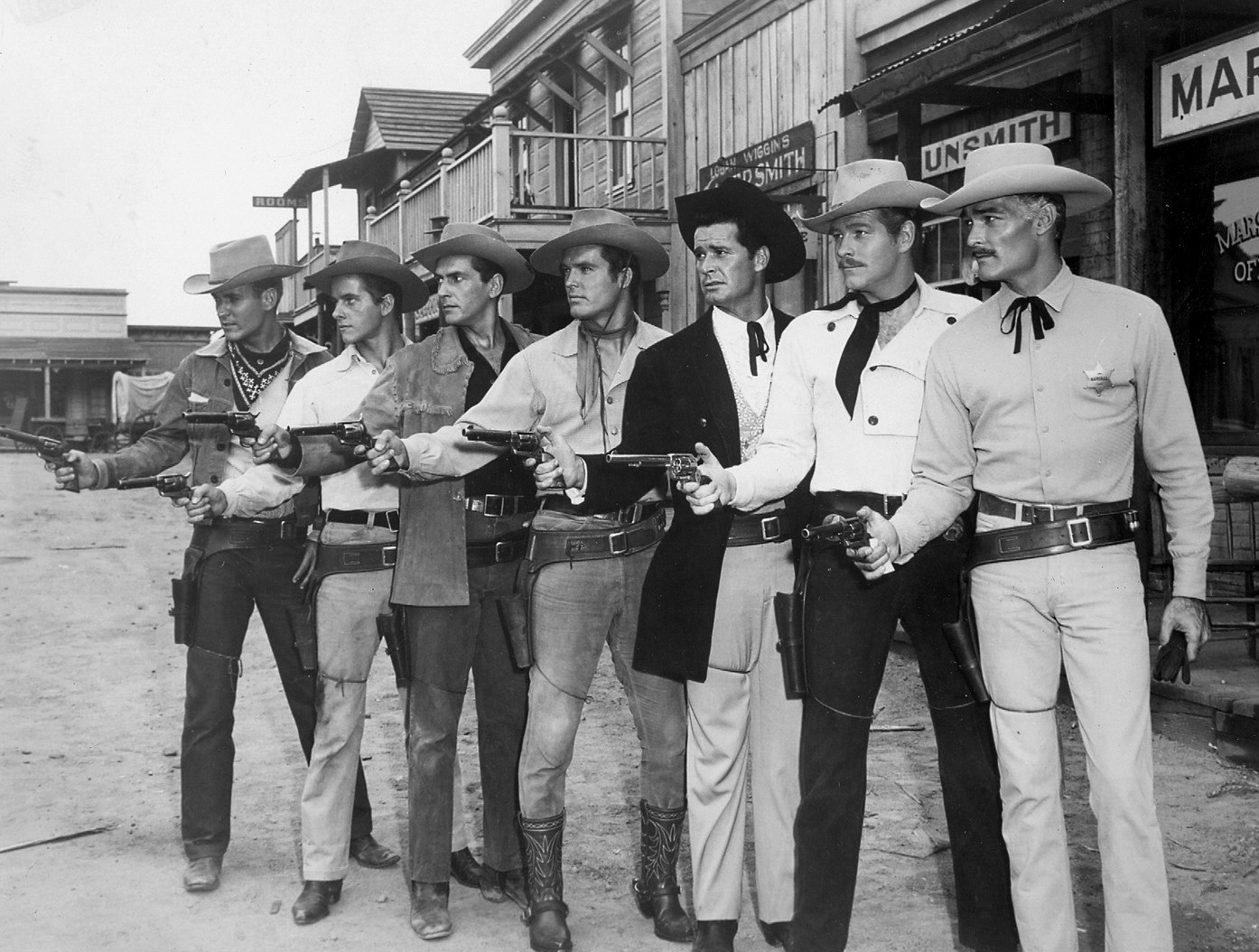
Publicity still with 1959 Warner Bros. series leads Will Hutchins (Sugarfoot), Peter Brown (Lawman), Jack Kelly (Maverick), Ty Hardin (Bronco), James Garner (Maverick), Wayde Preston (Colt .45), and John Russell (Lawman)

Marshall Lowell Hutchason (May 5, 1930 – April 21, 2025), known professionally as Will Hutchins, was an American actor most noted for playing the lead role of the young lawyer Tom Brewster, in the Western television series Sugarfoot, which aired on ABC from 1957 to 1961 for 69 episodes.

== Early life ==
Hutchins was born in the Atwater Village neighborhood of Los Angeles. As a child, he visited the location filming of Never Give a Sucker an Even Break and made his first appearance as an extra in a crowd.

He attended Pomona College in Claremont, California, where he majored in Greek drama. He also studied at the University of California at Los Angeles, where he enrolled in cinema classes.

During the Korean War, he served for two years in the United States Army Signal Corps as a cryptographer in Paris, serving as a Corporal with SHAPE. Following his enlistment he enrolled as a graduate student at UCLA in their Cinema Arts department on the G. I. Bill. Hutchins began acting and got a role on Matinee Theatre.

== Career ==
=== Warner Bros. ===
Hutchins was discovered by a talent scout for Warner Bros., who changed his name from Marshall Lowell Hutchason to Will Hutchins. The young actor's easygoing manner was compared to Will Rogers, the Oklahoma humorist. His contract led him to guest appearances in Warner Bros. Television programs, such as Conflict, in which he appeared in three hour-long episodes, including his screen debut as Ed Masters in "The Magic Brew" on October 16, 1956.

Hutchins was also cast as a guest star on Cheyenne, Bronco, Maverick and 77 Sunset Strip. He had small roles in the Warners movies Bombers B-52 (1957), Lafayette Escadrille (1958), and No Time for Sergeants (1958) where he screen tested for the lead of Will Stockdale with James Garner playing the psychiatrist.

==== Sugarfoot ====
Hutchins leapt to national fame in the lead of Sugarfoot, a drama with intermittent comedic overtones in which he played a frontier lawyer.

During the series' run he guest-starred on other Warner Bros shows such as The Roaring 20's, Bronco, and Surfside 6. He was the lead guest star in an episode of Maverick entitled "Bolt from the Blue" written and directed by Robert Altman and starring Roger Moore as Beau Maverick. He appeared in supporting roles in the Warner Bros films Claudelle Inglish (1961) and the World War II action picture Merrill's Marauders (1962), which starred Jeff Chandler.

=== Post-Warners ===
Hutchins guest-starred on Gunsmoke and The Alfred Hitchcock Hour. While appearing in a play in Chicago in late 1963, he was flown to Los Angeles to shoot a television pilot for MGM, Bert I. Gordon's Take Me to Your Leader, in which Hutchins played a Martian salesman who came to Earth. Though the pilot was not picked up, it led MGM to sign him for Spinout, in which he co-starred as Lt. Tracy Richards ("Dick Tracy" transposed) alongside Elvis Presley. Also in 1963, he appeared on an episode of Gunsmoke. In S8/Ep24, "Blind Man's Bluff", his character was Billy Poe. In 1965, Hutchins co-starred with Jack Nicholson and Warren Oates in Monte Hellman's The Shooting. In 1966, he made a guest appearance on the CBS courtroom drama series Perry Mason as Don Hobart in "The Case of the Scarlet Scandal".

=== Other TV series ===
In 1966–1967, he co-starred with Sandy Baron in Hey, Landlord, set in a New York City apartment building. The program followed Walt Disney's Wonderful World of Color, but it failed to attract a sustaining audience against CBS's The Ed Sullivan Show and ABC's The F.B.I. with Efrem Zimbalist Jr., his former Warner Brothers colleague. Hutchins was reunited with Presley in Clambake (1967). In 1968–69, he starred as Dagwood Bumstead in a CBS television version of the comic strip Blondie.

=== 1970s ===
He travelled to Rhodesia to appear in Shangani Patrol (1970) playing Frederick Russell Burnham. Back in the United States, Hutchins guest-starred on Love, American Style; Emergency!; Chase; Movin' On; The Streets of San Francisco; and The Quest. He was in The Horror at 37,000 Feet (1973), Slumber Party '57 (1976), and The Happy Hooker Goes to Washington (1977). He began appearing in circuses as Patches the Clown.

=== Later career ===
Hutchins had roles in Roar (1981), Gunfighter (1999) and The Romantics (2010).

== Personal life and death ==
Hutchins was married from 1965 to 1969 to Chris Burnett, sister of Carol Burnett, with whom he had a daughter. He married his second wife, Barbara Torres, in 1988.

Hutchins died of respiratory failure at North Shore University Hospital in Manhasset, New York, on April 21, 2025, at the age of 94, just 2 weeks before his 95th birthday on May 5.

== Major appearances ==
- 1965: The Shooting (film); Monte Hellman's low-budget Western with Jack Nicholson and Warren Oates.
- 1966: Spinout (film); Hutchins co-starred as Lt. Tracy Richards with Elvis Presley.
- 1967: Clambake (film); Hutchins co-stars with Elvis Presley, Shelley Fabares, and Bill Bixby.
- 1970: Shangani Patrol (film); co-starred as real-life American scout Frederick Burnham in a film based on the actual events of the Shangani Patrol, shot on location in Rhodesia.
- 1976: The Quest, a short-lived NBC western series, starring Kurt Russell and Tim Matheson.
- 1998: Gunfighter (film); a modern Western directed by Christopher Coppola.

== Filmography ==
- Bombers B-52 (1957) – Roberts – B-52 Navigator (uncredited)
- Lafayette Escadrille (1958) – Dave Putnam
- No Time for Sergeants (1958) – Lieutenant George Bridges
- Cheyenne (1961) (Episode "Duel at Judas Basin") – Tom 'Sugarfoot' Brewster
- Claudelle Inglish (1961) – Dennis Peasley
- Gunsmoke (1962) (Season 8 Episode 24: "Blind Man's Bluff) - Billy Poe
- Merrill's Marauders (1962) – Chowhound
- The Alfred Hitchcock Hour (1963) (Season 1 Episode 24: "The Star Juror") - J.J. Fenton
- The Shooting (1966) – Coley
- Spinout (1966) – Lieutenant Tracy Richards
- Clambake (1967) – Tom Wilson / 'Scott Heyward'
- Shangani Patrol (1970) – Frederick Russell Burnham
- The Horror at 37,000 Feet (1973, TV Movie) – Steve Holcomb
- Magnum Force (1973) – Stakeout Cop (uncredited)
- Slumber Party '57 (1976) – Harold Perkins
- The Happy Hooker Goes to Washington (1977) – Randall Petersdorf
- Roar (1981) – Committee Member
- Maverick (1994; scenes cut) – Spectator (uncredited)
- Gunfighter (1999) – The Judge
- The Romantics (2010) – Grandpa McDevon
