= Shangani River =

River in west and central Zimbabwe

Coordinates: 18°30′27″S 27°11′23″E

Shangani River in the Gwayi River catchment (center)

The Shangani is a river in Zimbabwe that starts near Gweru, Gweru River being one of its main tributaries, and goes through Midlands and Matabeleland North provinces. It empties into the Gwayi River.

The Shangani River was the site of the 4 December 1893 Shangani Patrol battle in which Major Allan Wilson and 31 men of the British South Africa Company were killed by the Matabele warriors. Only two Americans, Frederick Russell Burnham and Pete Ingram, and one Australian, W.L. Gooding, survived the attack.
