= Frank Fillis =

English and South African circus proprietor

Francis Edward Fillis
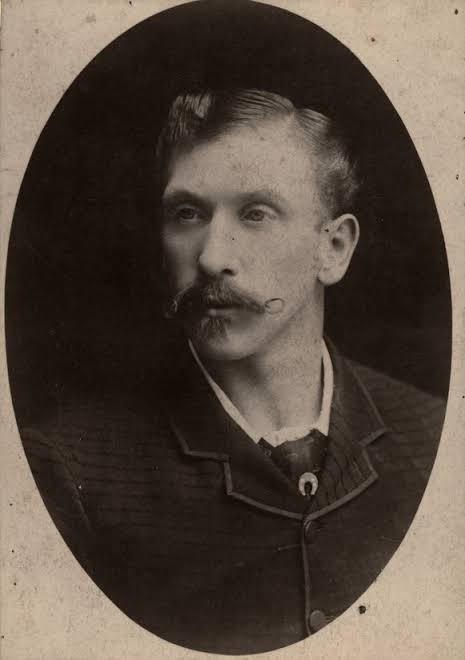
- Born: 13 July 1857; Lambeth, Surrey, England
- Died: 3 August 1922 (aged 65); Bangkok, Thailand
- Resting place: Bangkok Protestant Cemetery
- Other name: Frank Fillis
- Occupations: Equestrian, circus owner

Francis Edward Fillis (13 July 1857 – 3 August 1922) was an English and South African equestrian and circus proprietor. He is known for touring globally and for his 1899 exhibition at Earl's Court, part of the Greater Britain Exhibition, Savage South Africa.

== Biography ==
Francis "frank" Edward Fillis was born in Lambeth, then in Surrey, the son of Thomas and Esther. Fillis' was related to a number of family members who worked in theatres and circuses, particularly his father who worked variously as an "equestrian jester" and clown. Frank's mother died when he was only six and he was subsequently sent to Wales for schooling where he would first learn to ride horses. He would then work as part of a dog troupe in Glasgow where he would recall being mistreated before circus proprietor Joseph Taylor would take Frank in. Fillis would marry in 1877, the two having a son that would die in infancy.

=== Career ===
Fillis would find success in the circus and quickly become sought-after for his skills in gymnastics and difficult equestrian stunts. He would move between various circuses and eventually to South Africa in 1880.

He would open his own circus three years after his arrival and become one of the most renowned circus proprietors in South Africa, specialising in equestrian and strongmen acts he became popular among colonials.

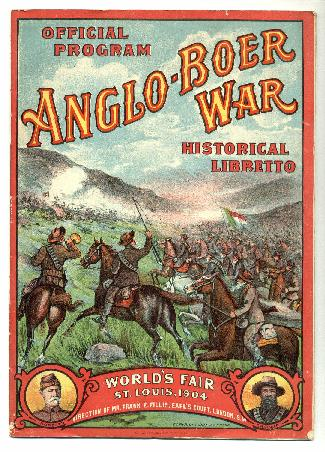
Programme for the Anglo-Boer War reenactment at the Louisiana Purchase Exhibition

=== Exhibitions ===
Fillis is well known for his showing of an exhibition in Earl's Court that involved natives of South Africa living in mock homesteads as well as animals native to Africa. It would involve up to 200 performers as well as well as hundreds of animals, considered the largest of such exhibitions up to that point.

The exhibition would characteristically involve equestrian stunts as well as reenactments of well known battles of the First and Second Matabele Wars. They would inspire the film Major Wilson's Last Stand.

The exhibition received controversy at the time, with questions raised in the House of Commons as to whether the exhibition was ethical, particularly as the participants may have been transported under deceptive recruitment.

In 1904 Fillis also produced a Boer War reenactment at the Louisiana Purchase Exhibition which was advertised as "the greatest and most realistic military spectacle known in the history of the world".
