= Shangani Patrol =

British South Africa Company unit attacked in 1893 in Rhodesia

- Part of the First Matabele War
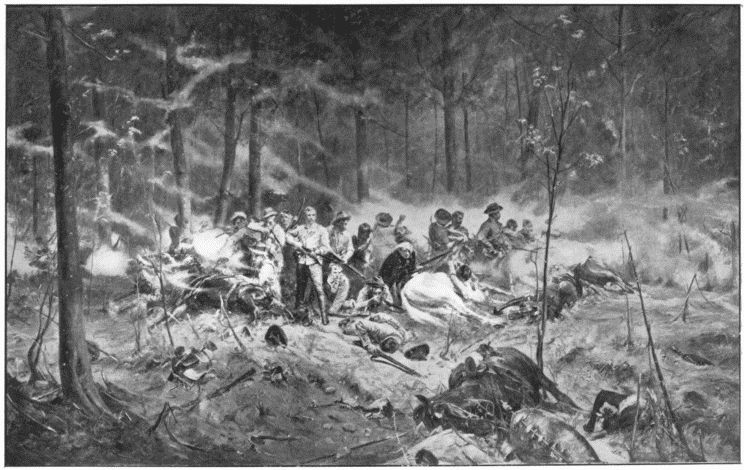
- There Were No Survivors, an 1896 depiction of the patrol's last stand, by Allan Stewart (1865–1951)
Date	3–4 December 1893
Location	North of the Shangani River, Matabeleland, Southern Rhodesia (now Zimbabwe)
Result	Matabele victory (Note: The Ndebele people's term for themselves in their own language is amaNdebele (the prefix ama- indicating the plural form of the singular Ndebele), whence comes a term commonly used in other languages, including English: "Matabele". Their language is called isiNdebele, generally rendered "Sindebele" in English. The area they have inhabited since their arrival from Zululand in the early 1800s is called Matabeleland. In historiographical terms, "Matabele" is retained in the names of the First and Second Matabele Wars, the former of which the Shangani Patrol was a part. For clarity, consistency and ease of reading, this article uses the term "Matabele" to refer to the people, and calls their language "Sindebele".)

Belligerents
Mthwakazi	British South Africa Company

Commanders and leaders
Lobengula; InDuna Mjaan	Maj. Allan Wilson †; Capt. Henry Borrow †

Strength
~3,000	37

Casualties and losses
~400–500 killed	34 killed (Note: Only two Americans, Frederick Russell Burnham and Pete Ingram, and one Australian, W.L. Gooding, survived the attack.)

The Shangani Patrol (or Wilson's Patrol) was a 37-soldier unit of the British South Africa Company that in 1893 was ambushed and annihilated by over 3,000 Matabele warriors in pre-Southern Rhodesia (now Zimbabwe), during the First Matabele War. Headed by Major Allan Wilson, the patrol was attacked just north of the Shangani River in Matabeleland, Rhodesia. Its dramatic last stand, sometimes called "Wilson's Last Stand", achieved a prominent place in the British public imagination and, subsequently, in Rhodesian history, similarly to events such as the Battle of the Little Bighorn and the Battle of the Alamo in the United States.

The patrol comprised elements of the Mashonaland Mounted Police and the Bechuanaland Border Police. Scouting ahead of Major Patrick Forbes's column attempting the capture of the Matabele King Lobengula (following his flight from his capital Bulawayo a month before), it crossed the Shangani late on 3 December 1893. It moved on Lobengula the next morning, but was ambushed by a host of Matabele riflemen and warriors near the king's wagon. Surrounded and outnumbered about a hundred-fold, the patrol made a last stand as three of its number broke out and rode back to the river to muster reinforcements from Forbes. However, the Shangani had risen significantly in flood, and Forbes was himself involved in a skirmish near the southern bank; Wilson and his men therefore remained isolated to the north. After fighting to the last cartridge, and killing over ten times their own number, they were annihilated.

The patrol's members, particularly Wilson and Captain Henry Borrow, were elevated in death to the status of national heroes, representing endeavour in the face of insurmountable odds. The anniversary of the battle on 4 December 1893 became an annual public holiday in Rhodesia two years later, and was an official non-work day until 1920. A historical war film depicting the episode, Shangani Patrol, was produced and released in 1970.

Controversy surrounds the breakout before the last stand—which various historians have posited might have actually been desertion—and a box of gold sovereigns, which a Matabele inDuna (leader) later said had been given to two unidentified men from Forbes's rear guard on 2 December, along with a message that Lobengula admitted defeat and wanted the column to stop pursuing him. Two batmen were initially found guilty of accepting the gold, keeping it for themselves and not passing on the message, but the evidence against them was inconclusive and largely circumstantial; the convictions were ultimately overturned.

== Background ==
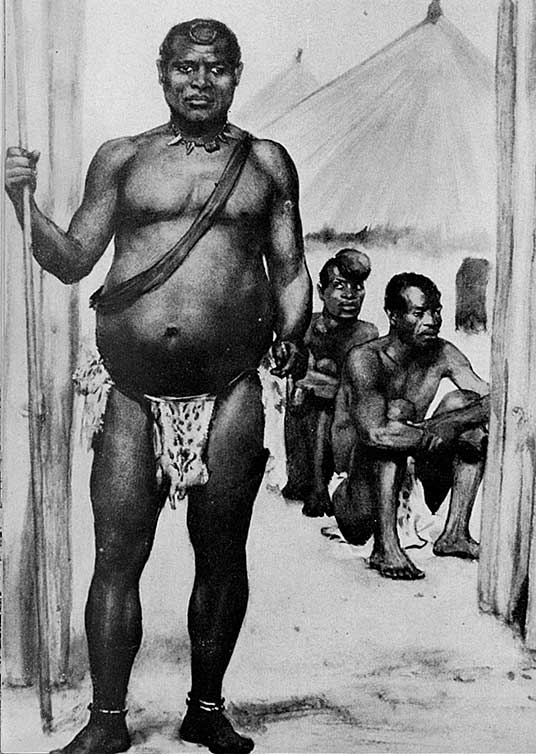
King Lobengula of Matabeleland (a posthumous depiction, based on a contemporary sketch)

Amid the Scramble for Africa during the 1880s, the South African-based businessman and politician Cecil Rhodes envisioned the annexation to the British Empire of a swathe of territory connecting the Cape of Good Hope and Cairo—respectively at the southern and northern tips of Africa—and the concurrent construction of a line of rail linking the two. On geopolitical maps, British territories were generally marked in red or pink, so this concept became known as the "Cape to Cairo red line". In the immediate vicinity of the Cape, this ambition was challenged by the presence of independent states to the north-east of Britain's Cape Colony: the Boer republics, and to the north of these the Kingdom of Matabeleland under Lobengula. Having secured the Rudd Concession on mining rights from King Lobengula on 30 October 1888, Rhodes and his British South Africa Company were granted a royal charter by Queen Victoria in October 1889. The company was empowered under this charter to trade with local rulers, form banks, own and manage land, and raise and run a police force: the British South Africa Company's Police, renamed the Mashonaland Mounted Police in 1892. (Note: The Matabeleland Mounted Police was added in 1895, with it and the Mashonaland Mounted Police becoming collectively called the Rhodesia Mounted Police. In 1896, this became the unitary, independently controlled British South Africa Police (BSAP). The BSAP endured as Rhodesia's police force until 1980.)

In return for these rights, the company would govern and develop any territory it acquired, while respecting laws enacted by extant African rulers, and upholding free trade within its borders. The first settlers referred to their new home as "Rhodesia", after Rhodes. (Note: The first recorded use in this context is in the titles of the Rhodesia Chronicle and Rhodesia Herald newspapers, respectively first published at Fort Tuli and Fort Salisbury in May and October 1892. The Company officially applied the name Rhodesia in 1895.) Though the company made good on most of its pledges, the assent of Lobengula and other native leaders, particularly regarding mining rights, was often evaded, misrepresented or simply ignored. It also offended Lobengula by demanding that he stop the customary Matabele raids on the Mashona people who inhabited the white-governed areas. Angered by the company's attitude towards his authority, Lobengula made war on the new arrivals and the Mashonas in 1893. Matabele warriors began the wholesale slaughter of Mashonas in the vicinity of Fort Victoria in July that year, and an indaba (tribal conference) organised by Company official Leander Starr Jameson to end the conflict ended with violence, and dispersion by force. The First Matabele War had started. Company columns rode from Fort Salisbury and Fort Victoria, and combined at Iron Mine Hill, around the centre point of the country, on 16 October 1893. Together the force totalled about 700 men, commanded by Major Patrick Forbes, and equipped with five Maxim machine guns. Forbes's combined column moved on the Matabele king's capital at Bulawayo, to the south-west. The Matabele army mobilised to prevent Forbes from reaching the city, and twice engaged the column as it approached: on 25 October, 3,500 warriors assaulted the column near the Shangani River. Lobengula's troops were well-drilled and formidable by pre-colonial African standards, but the company's Maxim guns, which had never before been used in battle, far exceeded expectations, according to an eyewitness "mow[ing] them down literally like grass". By the time the Matabele withdrew, they had suffered around 1,500 fatalities; the company, on the other hand, had lost only four men. A week later, on 1 November, 2,000 Matabele riflemen and 4,000 warriors attacked Forbes at Bembezi, about 30 miles (48 km) north-east of Bulawayo, but again they were no match for the crushing firepower of the major's Maxims: about 2,500 more Matabele were killed.

Lobengula fled Bulawayo as soon as he heard the news from Bembezi. On 3 November 1893, with the column on the outskirts of the city, he and his subjects left, torching the royal town as they went. (Note: This was in keeping with tribal custom; the royal towns of Matabele kings were never intended to be permanent. Whenever a king died, or as soon as local sources of water and food were exhausted, the capital moved and the old royal town was burned. This was the second of Lobengula's royal towns; the first, also called Bulawayo, was founded in 1870 and destroyed in 1881.) In the resultant conflagration, the city's large store of ivory, gold and other treasure was destroyed, as was its ammunition magazine, which exploded. The flames were still rising when the whites entered the settlement the next day; basing themselves in the "White Man's Camp" already present, they set about extinguishing the fire which engulfed the town. Using a tree to improvise a flagstaff, they hoisted first the Company flag, then the Union flag. The reconstruction of Bulawayo began almost as soon as the blaze was out, with a new white-run city rising atop the ruins of Lobengula's former residence. Jameson, who now based himself in Bulawayo, wrote the following letter to the Matabele king on 7 November 1893, in English, Dutch and Zulu:

I send this message in order, if possible, to prevent the necessity of any further killing of your people or burning of their kraals. To stop this useless slaughter you must at once come and see me at Bulawayo, where I will guarantee that your life will be safe and that you will be kindly treated. I will allow sufficient time for these messengers to reach you and two days more to allow you to reach me in your wagon. Should you not then arrive I shall at once send out troops to follow you, as I am determined as soon as possible to put the country in a condition where whites and blacks can live in peace and friendliness.

This letter, carried by John Grootboom, a coloured man from the Cape, reached Lobengula near Shiloh Mission, about 30 miles (48 km) north of Bulawayo. The king replied in English:

I have heard all that you have said, so I will come, but let me to ask you where are all my men which I have sent to the Cape, such as Maffett and Jonny and James, and after that the three men—Gobogobo, Mantose and Goebo—whom I sent. If I do come where will I get a house for me as all my houses is burn down, and also as soon as my men come which I have sent then I will come.

Jameson did not regard this ambiguity as a proper answer, and impatiently waited for further word from the king. After standing by for the specified two days and receiving nothing, he correctly concluded that Lobengula was stalling him, and using the extra time to distance himself from his former capital. Jameson therefore made good on his pledge, and called for volunteers; he assembled a host of about 470 men, mixed together from the Mashonaland Mounted Police, the Bechuanaland Border Police, and Raaff's Rangers, an independent unit led by the eponymous Commandant Piet Raaff. This force was placed under Forbes's command, with three Maxim guns attached. Jameson told the major to scout the area between Shiloh and Inyati for spoor, with the ultimate objective of capturing Lobengula, and sent him out just before sunset on 14 November 1893.

== Prelude: Forbes's pursuit of Lobengula ==
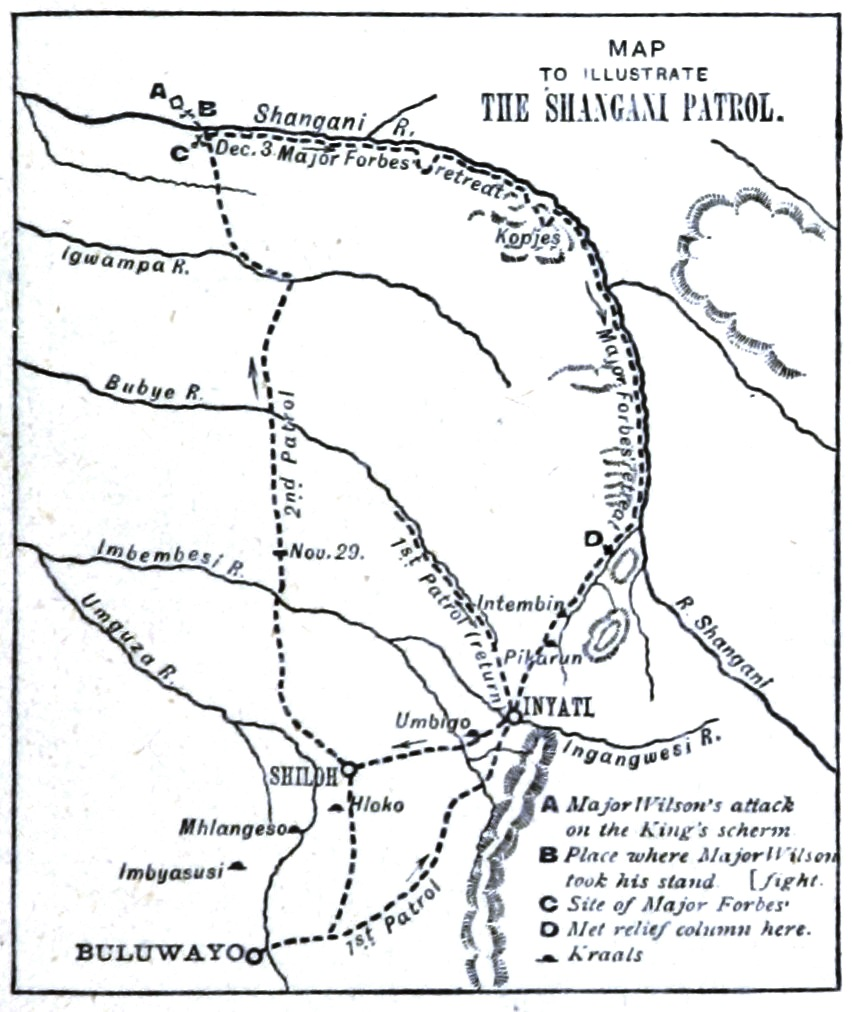
Route of the Shangani Patrol

The column left Bulawayo heading north, and, in an attempt to expedite its progress, reorganised itself into a more compact 290-man force at Shiloh. Lobengula, meanwhile, rode north towards the Shangani in his wagon, which left obvious tracks in its wake. Following the wagon tracks, Forbes's men were soon hot on the trail, routinely finding recently abandoned Matabele camps, provisions and stragglers. Heavy rain slowed both the king and his pursuers, and led Forbes to split his force again; moving on with a flying column of 160 men, he sent the rest back with the wagons. He pushed on, and on 3 December 1893 reached the southern bank of the Shangani, from where he could clearly see Matabele hastily driving cattle behind an impi (regiment) of warriors. The presence of smouldering fires beside the native column betrayed the fact that they had just crossed. Wishing to know whether the king had crossed here or at another point on the river, Forbes sent Major Allan Wilson across to scout ahead with 12 men and eight officers, and told him to return by nightfall.

Meanwhile, Forbes formed a laager (improvised fort) about 200 yards (180 m) from the southern bank. There, he interrogated a captive Matabele, the son of an inDuna (tribal leader), who said that the king was indeed where Wilson had gone, and was ill (the exact ailment was not known for sure, the prisoner said, but was suspected to be gout). The inDuna's son said that Lobengula had with him a force of about 3,000 warriors, about half of whom were armed with Martini–Henry rifles. They were mixed together from various regiments of the previously routed Matabele army, and largely demoralised, but still fiercely determined to prevent Lobengula's capture. Most prominent were the Imbezu, Ingubo and Insukameni Regiments; the Imbezu, Lobengula's favourite, was generally considered the strongest. After three weeks in pursuit of the king, Forbes's rations were running perilously short. He therefore resolved to attack the next day (4 December), hoping to be able to turn back for Bulawayo with Lobengula in custody before nightfall.

Wilson's men remained north of the river far longer than expected, and had still not returned when darkness fell. Forbes, meanwhile, received a report that most of Lobengula's force, commanded by inDuna Mjaan, had separated from the king and was moving to attack the laager the same night (this was actually an exaggeration; only about 300 riflemen had split from the main Matabele force, though they were indeed south of the river, undetected by Forbes). Visibility was poor by now, and rain periodically fell. The laager received no word from Wilson until about 21:00, when Sergeant-Major Judge and Corporal Ebbage arrived from across the river to tell Forbes that Wilson had found Lobengula's tracks, and followed him for 5 miles (8.0 km). Wilson regarded the chances of taking the king alive as so good that he was going to remain north of the river overnight. He asked Forbes to send more men and a Maxim gun in the morning, but did not explain what he planned to do with them.

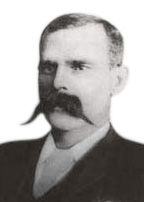
Major Allan Wilson led the Shangani Patrol.

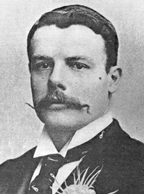
Captain Henry Borrow headed the reinforcements.

The Shangani Patrol continued its approach during the late evening, and scouted close to the bush enclosure housing Lobengula. Captain William Napier repeatedly called to the king in the Matabele language, Sindebele, but received no reply from the Matabele leaders, who remained silent and hid themselves. The patrol's actions confused the Matabele, who could not understand why there appeared to be so few Company soldiers, nor why they would reveal their position like this. They concluded that it must be a trap, and were only satisfied that it was not when Wilson's men had stopped during their approach to call to Lobengula five times. Following the fifth call from Napier, Mjaan ordered his riflemen to gather around the patrol, intending to pocket it. Noticing this, Wilson ordered a retreat, and took up a well-covered position in the bush where he could hide until daybreak. When Lieutenant Hofmeyer and Troopers Bradburn and Colquhoun were lost amid the increasingly stormy night, Wilson briefly backtracked to recover them.

On returning to his bush camp, Wilson sent a further message to the laager, which reached its destination at around 23:00: Napier, Scout Bain and Trooper Robertson were the men acting as runners. Wilson repeated that he was going to stay north of the river overnight, close to the king, and asked Forbes to bring the whole column across by 04:00 in the morning. Forbes thought it unwise to attempt a full river crossing at night, which he reasoned might lead to his force being surrounded in the darkness and massacred, but also felt he could not recall Wilson, as to do so would be to lose Lobengula for sure.

As a compromise, Forbes sent Captain Henry Borrow across with 21 men at 01:00 on 4 December, and told Borrow to relay to Wilson that the laager was surrounded, and "expected to be attacked any moment". Forbes apparently intended for Borrow's reinforcements to secure Wilson's position, but historian W D Gale writes that this was a serious tactical error on Forbes's part: the addition of Borrow's men made Wilson's patrol too large to be a mere reconnoitring force, but still too small to overpower the Matabele and capture the king. Indeed, Wilson and his officers looked on gloomily when Borrow's men arrived soon after dawn, fewer in number than expected and without the requested Maxim gun. Only 20 of the reinforcements (including Borrow himself) reached Wilson—Troopers Landsberg and Nesbitt became separated from the main group along the way, and eventually rejoined Forbes during the morning. Trooper Robertson returned to Wilson with Borrow, giving the patrol a total of 37 men, including its officers.

== Engagement ==
=== Matabele ambushes on both sides of the river ===
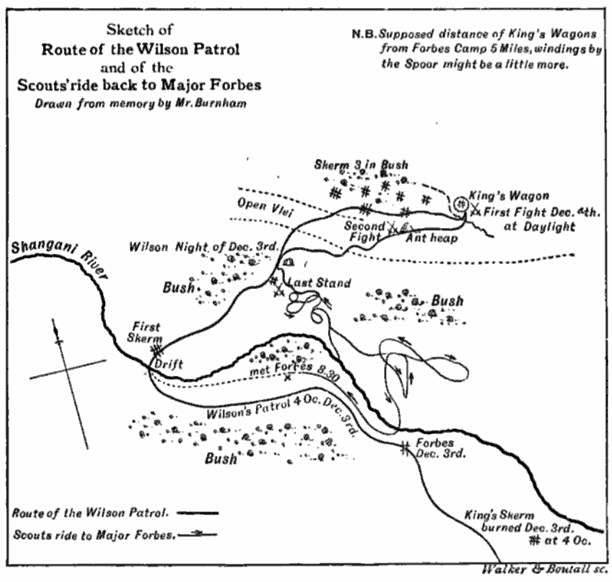
Sketch map of the area drawn by Frederick Russell Burnham, 1895

Wilson conferred with his officers, none of whom was particularly optimistic about their prospects: "This is the end" said one. British soldier and historian Roger Marston postulates that the patrol might still have been safe had it not now pursued the king, but Wilson decided to proceed: "Let's ride on Lobengula," he said. Several analysts comment that this was perhaps excessively rash. Marston says that Wilson's actions "had a flavour of doomed resignation about them", and suggests that the major believed no other path was open, and was therefore going for broke. The Matabele hovered around the vicinity, waiting to see what Wilson would do next. On the southern side of the river, the 300 Matabele riflemen took up a well-covered position near the riverbank, about 300 yards (270 m) to the left of Forbes's position. Hidden by a patch of scrub, they remained undetected by the Company troops.

Wilson, Borrow and the 35 others made for Lobengula's enclosure. The king's wagon was still there, but when Wilson called to him, there was no answer. The king had moved on during the night. At that moment, the troopers heard the sound of rifles being cocked in the wood surrounding them. A Matabele inDuna stepped out from behind a tree and announced that the enclosure was surrounded by thousands of Matabele who wanted to "see if the white men were afraid to die." He then fired his rifle to signal the start of the attack to his men. A volley from the Matabele riflemen followed, but most of the shots went too high; no Company trooper was hit. The only casualties of this opening volley were two of the patrol's horses. Wilson immediately ordered his men to fall back, first to an antheap, then to a thick wood. Three of them were wounded during this retreat, but none fatally.

Hearing the shots from the northern side of the river, Forbes uneasily moved towards the southern bank, intending to cross and help Wilson. However, Forbes's fears of an ambush proved to be well-founded; at an opportune moment, the Matabele in the scrub opened fire, catching the column in the open. The ambushers' shots were initially wild and inaccurate, but they soon began to focus their fire on the exposed Maxim guns and horses, forcing the troopers to retreat to cover. Five Company soldiers were injured. The resulting skirmish lasted about an hour, by which time the Shangani had been severely swollen by heavy rains upstream, causing it to flood.

Meanwhile, Wilson marched his officers and men back towards the river, hoping to reunite with Forbes. They moved on for about 1 mile (1.6 km), but soon noticed that a line of Matabele warriors was blocking their way to the river. Wilson refused to sacrifice his wounded by attempting to break through. In an act of desperation, he instead sent three of his men—American scouts Frederick Russell Burnham and Pearl "Pete" Ingram, and Australian Trooper William Gooding—to charge through the Matabele line, cross the river and bring reinforcements back to help, while he, Borrow and the rest made a last stand. Burnham, Ingram and Gooding broke through while the Matabele closed in on the surrounded patrol from a distance, and began to fire on it from cover, killing several of its men. After a while, Mjaan ordered his men to charge forward and finish them off, but the Matabele soon fell back, having taken about 40 fatalities.

Burnham, Ingram and Gooding reached the Shangani about 08:00, but quickly saw that the water had risen far too high for Forbes to provide any assistance. Realising the futility of turning back to Wilson without help, they decided to rejoin Forbes anyway, and to that end traversed the swollen river with considerable difficulty. They then rode to where the battle on the southern side was still going on. On reaching the main column shaken and out of breath, Burnham leapt from his horse and ran to Forbes: "I think I may say that we are the sole survivors of that party," he quietly confided, before loading his rifle and joining the skirmish.

=== Matabele victory north of the river; Wilson's last stand ===
We were fighting men of men, whose fathers were men before them. They fought and died together. Those who could have saved themselves chose to stay and remain and die with their brothers. Do not forget this. You did not think the white men were as brave as the Matabele: but now you must see that they are men indeed, to whom you are but timid girls.

— When all was over, Matabele inDuna Mjaan told his men to respect the fallen patrol

What happened to the Shangani Patrol after this point is known only from Matabele sources. Witness accounts were slowly gathered over three decades following the affair and various versions of events were offered, most being used by British publicists and the British South Africa Company to progressively lionise the actions of the British soldiers. According to these accounts, the warriors offered the remaining whites their lives if they surrendered, but Wilson's men refused to give up. They used their dead horses for cover, and killed more than ten times their own number (about 500, Mjaan estimated), but were steadily whittled down as the overwhelming Matabele force closed in from all sides. The Company soldiers continued fighting even when grievously wounded, to the astonishment of the Matabele, who thought the whites must be bewitched: "These are not men but magicians," said one Matabele inDuna.

Late in the afternoon, after hours of fighting, Wilson's men ran out of ammunition, and reacted to this by rising to their feet, shaking each other's hands and singing a song, possibly "God Save the Queen". (Note: Nityana, a Matabele, later told Rhodes's secretary Gordon Le Seuer that there were seven troopers left at this stage and that the song they sang was "God Save the Queen".) The Matabele downed their own rifles and ended the battle charging with assegai spears. Some of the whites allegedly used their last bullets to commit suicide. According to an eyewitness, "the white inDuna" (Wilson) was the last to die, standing motionless before the Matabele with blood streaming from wounds all over his body. After a few moments of hesitation, a young warrior ran forward and killed him with his assegai. The Matabele usually mutilated the bodies of their foes after a victory, but on this occasion they did not: "The white men died so bravely we would not treat them as we do the cowardly Mashonas and others," an inDuna explained. At Mjaan's orders, the bodies of the patrol were left untouched, though the whites' clothes and two of their facial skins were collected the next morning to serve as proof to Lobengula of the battle's outcome. "I had two sons killed that day," Ingubo warrior M'Kotchwana later said, "and my brother was shot in the stomach. The amakiwa [whites] were brave men; they were warriors."

== Men of the Shangani Patrol ==
Of the 43 men involved in Wilson's patrol (including the major himself), 37 were present when the battle began. This was reduced to 34 when Wilson ordered Burnham, Ingram and Gooding to break out. Those left behind were all killed in action. Though the men of the patrol came from several parts of the British Empire as well as other countries, most were born in Britain itself: Lieutenant-Colonel Hugh Marshall Hole writes that of these "over a dozen were English Public School and University men". Wilson was Scottish, while Borrow was born in Cornwall. Also represented in the patrol were South Africa (several members, most prominently Captain William Judd), the United States (Burnham and Ingram), India (Troopers Dillon and Money), Canada (Scout Robert Bain), Australia (Gooding) and New Zealand (Trooper Frank Vogel). No member of the patrol was born in Matabeleland or Mashonaland.

== Aftermath ==
=== Forbes's retreat, Lobengula's death and the end of the war ===
After the battle on the southern side of the Shangani was over, Forbes and his column conducted a cursory search for survivors from Wilson's party, but, unable to cross the river, could see nothing to tell them what had happened. Guessing (correctly) that all Company men beyond the river had been killed, they turned and trekked back to Bulawayo in miserable fashion, their supplies all but gone and the Matabele impeding their progress at every turn.

... No news from Wilson's party—Forbes in disgrace—Raaff practically running the show ...

— Extract from the journal of a soldier serving in the column during its retreat

Matabele raiding parties attacked the retreating column six times during its two-week journey back to Bulawayo. In pouring rain, the dishevelled men were soon mostly on foot, existing off horse meat and wearing makeshift shoes made from ammunition wallets. Forbes felt so humiliated by the events that he retreated from command in all but name, surrendering de facto control to Commandant Raaff. In leading the column back to Bulawayo, Raaff repeatedly drew on his experience from the Anglo-Zulu War to ensure the survival of the haggard men. He avoided several Matabele ambushes, and at one point set up a convincing decoy camp that the Matabele fired on for half a day, wasting much of their ammunition.

On the column's inglorious return to Bulawayo on 18 December 1893, Forbes was received in muted disgrace. The officers and men stood on parade for Cecil Rhodes, and the Company chief passed the major without a word. Raaff, on the other hand, was publicly commended by Rhodes, and thanked for ensuring the column's safe return.

Meanwhile, Lobengula moved to the north-east, now well out of the company's reach for the foreseeable future. However, his sickness, which turned out to be smallpox, sharply intensified and eventually killed him on 22 or 23 January 1894. With the king dead, Mjaan, the most senior of the izinDuna, took command of the Matabele. Mjaan was an old man, and his only son had been killed in the war. He wished to make peace. In late February 1894, he convened an indaba at which he and his contemporaries met with James Dawson, a trader known to them for many years, who offered the olive branch on behalf of the company. The izinDuna unanimously accepted. They also told the trader what had happened to the Shangani Patrol, and led him to the battle site to survey it, as well as to examine and identify the largely skeletonised bodies of the soldiers, which still lay where they had fallen. Dawson was the first non-Matabele to learn of the last stand.

=== Cultural impact, burial and memorial ===
Shangani Memorial
- National Museums and Monuments of Zimbabwe
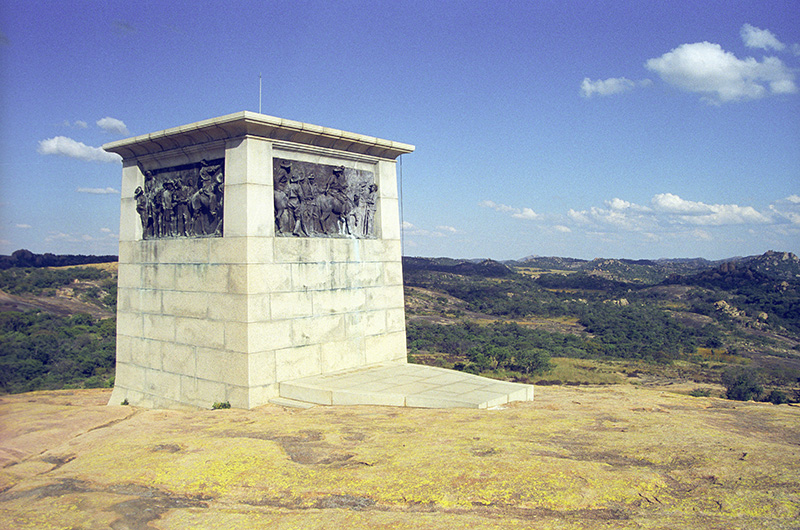
- The Shangani Memorial, which was erected at World's View in the Matopos Hills in 1904
- For the dead of the Shangani Patrol
- Unveiled: July 1904
- Location: 20°29′38.9″S 28°30′52.6″E; Malindidzimu (World's View) near Bulawayo
- Designed by: Herbert Baker; John Tweed
- TO BRAVE MEN To the enduring memory of Allan Wilson and his men whose names are hereon inscribed and who fell in fight against the Matabele on the Shangani River on December the 4th. 1893. There was no survivor. Reading from left to right the names are as follows West Panel; Capt. Borrow (MTD); Serft. Brown. . Money; Sergt. Major Harding; Major Wilson (MTD); Capt. Kirton (DO); Corpl. Colquhoun. . Kinlogh North Panel; Tpr. Dewis; Lieut. Hughes (MTD); TPR. Brock. . Dillon. . De Vos. . Watson. . Britton; Capt. Greenfield (MTD); Sergt. Birkley East Panel; TPR. Nunn. . Tuck. . Oliver; Capt. Fitzgerald (MTD); TPR. J. Robertson (DO). . Thompson. . Bath. . Hay-Robertson; Sergt. Bradburn South Panel; TPR. Meiklejohn; Lieut. Hofmeyer (MTD); TPR. Mackenzie; Capt. Judd (MTD); TPR. Welby. . Abbot. . Vogel. . Mellet

News of the patrol's fate was quickly relayed from Rhodesia to South Africa, and then on to the rest of the British Empire and the world. The British press was made aware of the events after Sir Henry Loch, the High Commissioner for Southern Africa, sent a telegram to London. Newspapers supportive of British imperialism devoted significant amounts of coverage to the battle, and others which were generally more lukewarm about colonial projects also pursued accounts of the patrol. The Times described the patrol's last stand as a "massacre" and printed biographies of Wilson and some of the other British soldiers. Illustrated newspapers published drawn depictions of the final clashes.

In England, a patriotic play overtly influenced by the incident, Cheer, Boys, Cheer!, was written by Augustus Harris, Cecil Raleigh and Henry Hamilton, and staged at the Theatre Royal, Drury Lane, starting in September 1895. The show tells the story of a young colonial army officer in South Africa and Rhodesia, culminating in the third act with a fictionalised account of the First Matabele War. This itself climaxes with a scene strongly reminiscent of Wilson's last stand. The production ran for nearly six months in London, and then toured the British provinces for more than two years, reportedly drawing large crowds. According to historian Neil Parsons, it contributed to the patrol "fast gain[ing] mythological status".

In historical terms, the Shangani Patrol subsequently became an integral part of Rhodesian identity, with Wilson and Borrow in particular woven into the national tapestry as heroic figures symbolising duty in the face of insuperable odds. Their last stand together became a kind of national myth, as Lewis Gann writes, "a glorious memory, [Rhodesia's] own equivalent of the bloody Alamo massacre and Custer's Last Stand in the American West". In 1895, 4 December was declared "Shangani Day", an annual Rhodesian public holiday which endured until 1920, when it was folded into Occupation Day, a national non-work day which commemorated several early colonial events together. Shangani Day remained part of the national calendar, however, and was still marked each year.

The remains of the patrol's members were buried on the battle ground by Dawson. He travelled to the site and buried what he could under a Mopane tree, into which he carved a cross and the inscription 'To Brave Men'. On 14 August 1894, in the ruined city of Great Zimbabwe. The Mopane tree at the original site was cut down and is now kept at the Bulwayo Natural History Museum. Rhodes later wrote into his will that he wished to have the patrol re-interred alongside him at World's View, in the Matopos Hills, when he died; this was done in 1904, two years after Rhodes's death. Also according to Rhodes's wishes, a memorial to the Shangani Patrol was erected at World's View in July 1904, and dedicated by Bishop William Gaul of Mashonaland. The monument, called the Shangani Memorial, is an oblong, flat-topped structure, about 33 feet (10 m) tall and made from granite from a nearby kopje. It was designed by Herbert Baker, and based on the Pedestal of Agrippa at the Athens Acropolis. Each of the memorial's four sides bears a bronze panel by John Tweed, depicting members of the patrol in relief. The main inscription reads, "To Brave Men", with a smaller dedication given beneath: "To the enduring memory of Allan Wilson and his men whose names are hereon inscribed and who fell in fight against the Matabele on the Shangani River on December the 4th. 1893. There was no survivor."

== Controversy ==
=== Lobengula's box of sovereigns ===
Soon following the end of the war, one of Lobengula's izinDuna told Dawson that just before Forbes's column had reached the Shangani, two Matabele messengers, Petchan and Sehuloholu, had been given a box of gold sovereigns by Lobengula, and instructed to intercept the column before it reached the river. They were to tell the whites that the king admitted defeat and offered this tribute, totalling about £1,000, on the condition that the column immediately turn back and cease harassing him. "Gold is the only thing that will stop the white men," Lobengula reportedly concluded. According to the inDuna, Petchan and Sehuloholu reached the column on 2 December 1893, the day before it reached the Shangani, and hid in the bush as it went by. They then caught up with it and gave the money and the message to two men in the rear guard.

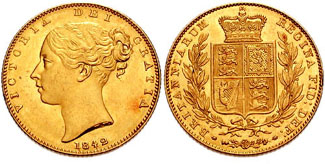
Gold sovereigns bearing the likeness of Queen Victoria, minted in 1842

Dawson relayed this story to Bulawayo, where Company authorities made enquiries. No man who had been attached to the column corroborated the account. The Company thought it unlikely that a Matabele inDuna would simply invent a story such as this, however, and angrily speculated that if it were true, then negotiations with Lobengula might have been opened and the war ended before Wilson crossed the river, and the entire episode of the Shangani Patrol avoided (though, as historian Robert Cary writes, this surmision ignores the fact that Forbes had been ordered to capture Lobengula, not end the war). Lawyers appointed by the Company launched a formal investigation early in 1894.

Two officers' batmen, William Charles Daniel and James Wilson (no relation to Allan Wilson), soon became prime suspects, with Daniel arraigned as the senior instigator. They were accused of accepting the gold from Petchan and Sehuloholu, then keeping it for themselves and not passing on the message. Both men denied all charges. Neither Daniel nor Wilson had been members of the rear guard on 2 December, though either or both could have been there at some point during the day. No Matabele witness recognised either of them at the court in Bulawayo, where the case was heard by the Resident Magistrate and four assessors.

The evidence against the batmen was largely circumstantial: both had been seen to possess unusually large amounts of gold soon after the column's return, and both had since bought farming rights, paying cash. Daniel said he had won the money in his possession playing cards, while Wilson claimed to have brought his with him when he came to Rhodesia. Witnesses confirmed that there had been heavy gambling at Inyati camp, in which Daniel and Wilson had actively taken part, both possessing noticeable reserves in gold sovereigns. Sehuloholu claimed in his statement that both of the men he had met in the rear guard had fluently and perfectly spoken to him in Sindebele, but neither of the accused men knew the language, and the only member of the column who did at a fluent level was a medical orderly who had never been near the rear guard. The prosecutor proposed that Sehuloholu could be exaggerating the standard of Sindebele spoken by the men he had met, pointing out that most of the phrases quoted were actually relatively basic, and did not imply a profound understanding of the language.

Unable to definitely prove to the court where their money had come from, Daniel and Wilson were eventually found guilty, and sentenced to 14 years' hard labour. However, the maximum term the Magistrate could legally impose was three months, and in 1896 they were released at the order of the High Commissioner for Southern Africa, Henry Loch. The High Commissioner's legal team subsequently quashed the convictions altogether, saying that the evidence against Daniel and Wilson was not sufficiently conclusive. The existence of Lobengula's box of sovereigns was never proven either way, and the incident never explained beyond doubt.

=== Burnham, Ingram and Gooding ===
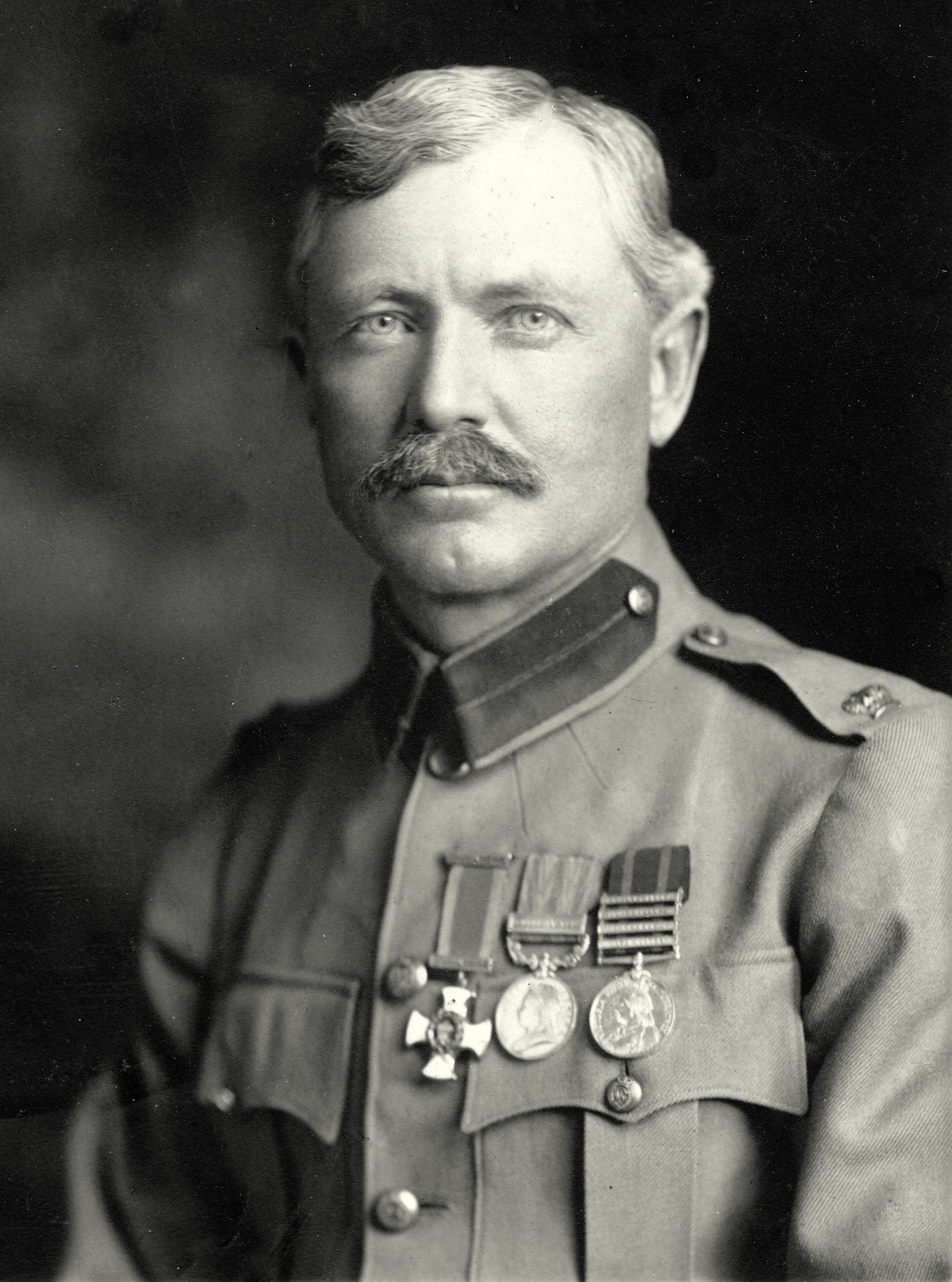
Chief of Scouts Frederick Russell Burnham in 1901, during the Second Boer War

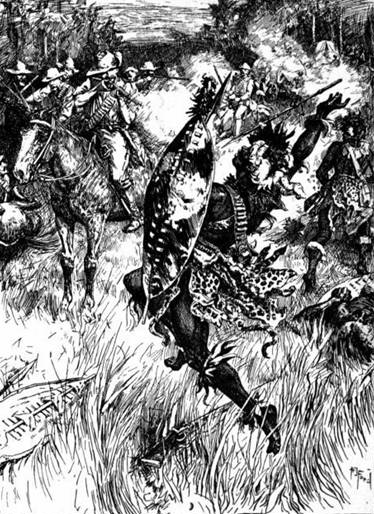
An 1895 sketch, portraying a scene from the battle. Burnham (left, on horse) kills a Matabele warrior.

The version of events recorded by history is based on the accounts of Burnham, Ingram and Gooding, the Matabele present at the battle (particularly inDuna Mjaan), and the men of Forbes's column. Burnham, Ingram and Gooding's stories closely corroborate each other; their version of events was accepted as true by the Court of Inquiry at Bulawayo in December 1893. First-hand Matabele accounts such as Mjaan's, which were first recorded during 1894, appear to confirm the character of the break-out, saying that three of the white men they were fighting—including Burnham, whom several of them recognised—left during a lull in the battle, just after Wilson withdrew to his final position.

While all of the direct evidence given by eyewitnesses supports the findings of the Court of Inquiry, some historians and writers debate whether or not Burnham, Ingram and Gooding really were sent back by Wilson to fetch help, and suggest that they might have simply deserted when the battle got rough. Proponents of this desertion theory frequently portray Burnham as a man who embellished facts and coerced eyewitnesses into falsifying statements. The earliest recording of this claim of desertion is in a letter written in 1935 by John Coghlan, a cousin of Southern Rhodesia's first Prime Minister, Charles Coghlan. John Coghlan wrote to a friend, John Carruthers, on 14 December that year that "a very reliable man informed me that Wools-Sampson told him" that Gooding had confessed on his deathbed (in 1899) that he and the two Americans had not actually been despatched by Wilson, and had simply left on their own accord. This double hearsay confession, coming from an anonymous source, is not mentioned in Gooding's 1899 obituary, which instead recounts the events as generally recorded.

Peter Emmerson, a historian and supporter of the desertion theory, asks why Wilson would have sent three of his men away at such a precarious moment. J P Lott, another historian, comments that Wilson had sent runners to Forbes twice the previous night, when he was already at very close quarters with the Matabele and with far fewer men; he surmises that it would not be out of the ordinary for the major to do so again. In his evaluation John O'Reilly asks why Wilson sent Gooding back with the two Americans; Burnham and Ingram, both seasoned scouts, were enough. Gooding writes in his account that Wilson originally only asked Burnham to ride to Forbes, and that Captain Judd suggested to Wilson that Burnham should take two men with him. The Chief of Scouts requested Ingram, and Borrow asked Gooding to go too. Burnham also says that Borrow sent Gooding.

Burnham, Ingram and Gooding each received the British South Africa Company Medal for their service in the First Matabele War, and all three subsequently served in the Second Matabele War of 1896–97. All of the officers and troopers of Forbes' column reported high praise for Burnham's actions and none reported any doubts about his conduct even decades later. One member of the column, Trooper M E Weale, told the Rhodesia Herald on 22 December 1944 that once Commandant Raaff took over command it was greatly due to Burnham's good scouting that the column managed to get away: "I have always felt that the honours were equally divided between these two men, to whom we owed our lives on that occasion."

== Legacy ==
The last stand of the patrol was re-enacted once more at the 1899 Greater Britain Exhibition in London, during which scenes from the Matabele wars were re-created as part of a play called Savage South Africa: A Vivid, Realistic and Picturesque Representation of Life in the Wilds of Africa, culminating in "Major Wilson's Last Stand". The show featured Lobengula's son, Peter Lobengula—described as "Prince Lobengula, the redoubtable warrior chieftain". A short war film based the show's version of the final engagement, Major Wilson's Last Stand, was released by Levi, Jones & Company studios in 1899. A historical war film, also called Shangani Patrol, was filmed on location and released in 1970. The author Alexander Fullerton wrote a novel about the patrol's last stand, entitled The White Men Sang (1958).

Though much of the mythology surrounding the patrol and the site has dissipated in the national consciousness since the country's reconstitution as Zimbabwe in 1980, World's View endures as a tourist attraction to this day. A campaign in the 1990s to dismantle the monument and remove the graves met with strong opposition from both local residents and the Department of National Museums and Monuments, partly because of the income it brings from visitors, and partly out of respect for the site and the history surrounding it.

== Notes and references ==
Footnotes

Source notes

Online sources

- "British South Africa Company (BSAC, BSACO, or BSA Company)". Encyclopædia Britannica Online. Chicago, Illinois: Encyclopædia Britannica, Inc.

Newspaper and journal articles

- Brelsford, W V, ed. (1954). "First Records—No. 6. The Name 'Rhodesia'". The Northern Rhodesia Journal. II (4). Lusaka: Northern Rhodesia Society: 101–102.
- Brookes, Arthur C, ed. (December 1899). "Films". The Photographic Dealer and Optical and Scientific Apparatus Trades Journal. VII (43). London: Photographic Dealer Limited: 147.
- Burnham, Frederick Russell (8–9 January 1895). "Shangani Patrol". Westminster Gazette. London: Edward Tyas Cook.
- Burnham, Frederick Russell (13 March 1895). "The Story of the Wilson Patrol". Tuapeka Times. XXVII (4, 186). Lawrence, New Zealand: Thomas and Richard Pilling: 6.
- Du Toit, Stefanns Jacobus (1897). "How Wilson And His Men Perished". Rhodesia, Past and Present. London: Heinemann.
- Farwell, Byron (March 1976). "Taking Sides in the Boer War". American Heritage. 20 (3). Rockville, Maryland: American Heritage Publishing Company. ISSN 0002-8738.
- Gooding, W L (10 July 1894). "A Ride for Life". Grey River Argus. XXXVI (7, 986). Greymouth, New Zealand: James Kerr.
- Lott, J P (September 1976). "Major F R Burnham, DSO: A Vindication". Rhodesiana (35). Salisbury: The Rhodesiana Society: 43–47. ISSN 0556-9605. OCLC 1904759.
- M'Kotchwana (23 July 1898). "Wilson's Last Stand". The Sydney Mail. John Fairfax and Sons: 230, column 4.
- Napier, William (November–December 1893). "Diary of the Shangani Patrol". Historical Manuscripts Collection. National Archives of Zimbabwe. MISC/NA4/1/1.
- Ransford, O N (July 1968). "'White Man's Camp', Bulawayo". Rhodesiana (18). Salisbury: The Rhodesiana Society: 13–21.
- "Today". The Times. London: John Walter: 3. 19 September 1895.
- "Olympic Theatre". The Times. London: John Walter: 8. 24 February 1896.
- "Queen's Theatre – Cheer, Boys, Cheer". The Manchester Guardian. Edward Taylor: 8. 4 October 1898.
- "Death of a Rhodesian Pioneer". Lloyd's Weekly Newspaper. London: Frank Lloyd: 9. 1 October 1899.
- "1893 Sequence of Events; The Wilson (Shangani) Patrol". Centenary of the Matabele War of 1893. Harare: Mashonaland Branch of the History Society of Zimbabwe. 25–26 September 1993.

Other sources

- The UDI Song / Shangani Patrol (vinyl record). Nick Taylor. South Africa: RCA Victor. 1966. 41.890.

Bibliography

- Armes, Roy (2008). Dictionary of African Filmmakers. Bloomington, Indiana: Indiana University Press. ISBN 978-0-253-35116-6.
- Berlyn, Phillippa (April 1978). The Quiet Man: A Biography of the Hon. Ian Douglas Smith. Salisbury: M O Collins. OCLC 4282978.
- Blake, Robert (1977). A History of Rhodesia (First ed.). London: Eyre Methuen. ISBN 9780413283504.
- Burnham, Frederick Russell (1926). Scouting on Two Continents. New York: Doubleday, Page & Company. ISBN 978-1-879356-31-3.
- Cary, Robert (1968). A Time to Die. Cape Town: Howard Timmins.
- Cramer, James (1964). The World's Police. London: Cassell.
- Davis, Richard Harding (1906). Real Soldiers of Fortune. New York: Charles Scribner's Sons. ISBN 978-0-87364-239-2.
- Farwell, Byron (2001). The Encyclopedia of Nineteenth-Century Land Warfare: An Illustrated World View. New York: W W Norton & Company. ISBN 0-393-04770-9.
- Ferguson, Niall (April 2004). Empire: the rise and demise of the British world order and the lessons for global power. New York: Basic Books. ISBN 978-0-465-02329-5.
- Fisher, J L (2010). Pioneers, settlers, aliens, exiles: the decolonisation of white identity in Zimbabwe. Canberra: ANU E Press. ISBN 978-1-921666-14-8.
- Forbes, Archibald; Henty, G A; Griffiths, Arthur (1896). Battles of the Nineteenth Century, Volume 1 (First ed.). London: Cassell.
- Gale, W D (1958). Zambezi Sunrise: How Civilisation Came to Rhodesia and Nyasaland. Cape Town: Howard Timmins.
- Gale, W D (1976) [1935]. One Man's Vision: the Story of Rhodesia. Bulawayo: Books of Rhodesia. ISBN 978-0-86920-142-8.
- Gann, Lewis H (1965). A history of Southern Rhodesia; early days to 1934 (First ed.). London: Chatto & Windus. ISBN 978-0-85664-771-0.
- Gibbs, Peter; Phillips, Hugh; Russell, Nick (May 2009). Blue and Old Gold: The History of the British South Africa Police, 1889–1980. Johannesburg: 30° South Publishers. ISBN 978-1-920143-35-0.
- Hammond, John Hays (September 1974) [1935]. The Autobiography of John Hays Hammond. New York: Ayer Publishing. ISBN 978-0-405-05913-1.
- Hays, Michael; Nikolopoulou, Anastasia (February 1999) [1996]. Melodrama: The Cultural Emergence of a Genre. New York: St. Martin's Press. ISBN 978-0-312-22127-0.
- Hensman, Howard (1900). A History of Rhodesia: compiled from official sources. Edinburgh & London: W. Blackwood & Sons.
- Hopkins, Donald R (September 2002) [1983]. The Greatest Killer: Smallpox in History. Chicago, Illinois: University of Chicago Press. ISBN 978-0-226-35168-1.
- Kemper, Steve (2016). A Splendid Savage: The Restless Life of Frederick Russell Burnham. New York: W W Norton & Company. ISBN 978-0-393-23927-0.
- Keppel-Jones, Arthur (1983). Rhodes and Rhodesia: The White Conquest of Zimbabwe, 1884–1902. Montreal, Quebec and Kingston, Ontario: McGill-Queen's University Press. ISBN 978-0-7735-0534-6.
- Knight, Ian (July 1989). Queen Victoria's Enemies: Southern Africa. Oxford: Osprey Publishing. ISBN 978-0-85045-901-2.
- Lang, Andrew (1895). The Red True Story Book. London: Longmans, Green, and Co. OCLC 2567926.
- Lott, Jack (1981). Boddington, Craig (ed.). America – The Men and Their Guns That Made Her Great. Los Angeles: Petersen Publishing Company. ISBN 978-0-8227-3022-4.
- Marshall Hole, Hugh (1926). The Making of Rhodesia. London: Macmillan Publishers.
- MacDonald, Robert H. (1994). The Language of Empire: Myths and Metaphors of Popular Imperialism, 1880-1918. Manchester University Press. ISBN 9780719037498.
- MacKenzie, John (1986). Imperialism and Popular Culture. Manchester: Manchester University Press. ISBN 9780719018688.
- Marston, Roger (January 2010). Own Goals – National pride and defeat in war: the Rhodesian experience. Northampton: Paragon Publishing. ISBN 978-1-899820-81-8.
- Nobbs, Eric A (1956). Tredgold, Robert Clarkson (ed.). The Matopos. Salisbury: Federal Department of Printing and Stationery.
- O'Reilly, John (1970). Pursuit of the king: an evaluation of the Shangani Patrol in the light of sources read by the author. Bulawayo: Books of Rhodesia. ASIN B005TAHXR4.
- Parsons, Neil (1998). King Khama, Emperor Joe, and the great white queen: Victorian Britain through African eyes (First ed.). Chicago, Illinois: University of Chicago Press. ISBN 978-0-226-64744-9.
- Preller, Gustav Schoeman (1963). Lobengula: the tragedy of a Matabele king. Johannesburg: Afrikaanse Pero-Boekhandel.
- Ranger, Terence O (September 2010). Bulawayo Burning: The Social History of a Southern African City, 1893–1960. Oxford: James Currey. ISBN 978-1-84701-020-9.
- Ransford, Oliver (October 1968). The Rulers of Rhodesia: From Earliest Times to the Referendum. London: John Murray. ISBN 978-0-7195-1822-5.
- Todd, Judith (1966). Rhodesia. London: MacGibbon & Kee.
- Wills, W A; Collingridge, L T (1894). The Downfall of Lobengula: the cause, history, and effect of the Matabeli war. London: The African Review. ISBN 978-0-8371-1653-2.
- Wilson, N H; Taylor, Guy A, eds. (1935). The Southern Rhodesia Native Affairs Department annual. Issues 13–18. Salisbury: Southern Rhodesia Native Affairs Department.
- Wrigley, Richard; Craske, Matthew, eds. (July 2004). Pantheons: transformations of a monumental idea. Aldershot: Ashgate Publishing Company. ISBN 978-0-7546-0808-0.
