= Scout Association of Zimbabwe =

National Scouting association of Zimbabwe

The Scout Association of Zimbabwe
- Headquarters: 120 McChlery, Harare
- Country: Zimbabwe
- Membership: 5,932
- Chief Scout: Chris Bwanali
- Chief Scout Commissioner: Slyvester Chin'anga
- Affiliation: World Organization of the Scout Movement
- Website

The Scout Association of Zimbabwe is a member of the World Organization of the Scout Movement. Scouting in Zimbabwe shares history with Malaŵi and Zambia, with which it was linked for decades.

== Birthplace of Scouting ==
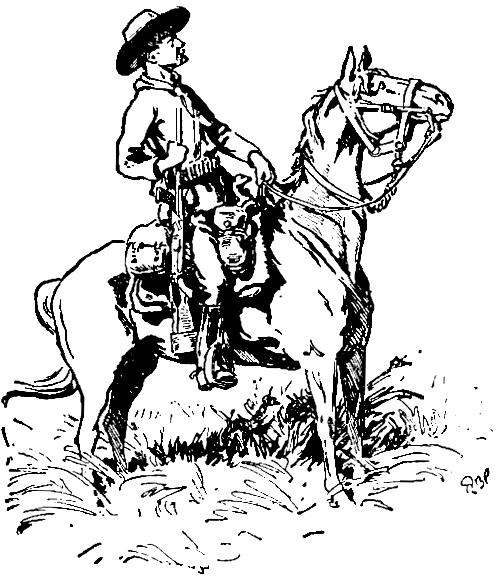
Baden-Powell's sketch of Chief of Scouts Burnham, Matobo Hills, 1896.

It was in the Matabeleland region in Zimbabwe that, during the Second Matabele War, Robert Baden-Powell, who later became the founder of Scouting, and Frederick Russell Burnham, the American born Chief of Scouts for the British Army, first met and began their lifelong friendship. Baden-Powell had only recently arrived in Matabeleland as Chief of Staff to Gen. Carrington when he started scouting with Burnham. This would become a formative experience for Baden-Powell not only because he had the time of his life commanding reconnaissance missions into enemy territory in Matobo Hills, but because many of his later Boy Scout ideas took hold here. Burnham had been a scout practically his entire life in the United States when he went to Africa in 1893 to scout for Cecil Rhodes on the Cape-to-Cairo Railway. As Chief of Scouts under Major Allan Wilson, Burnham became known in Africa as he-who-sees-in-the-dark and he gained fame in the First Matabele War when he survived the British equivalent of Custer's Last Stand, the Shangani Patrol.

In mid-June 1896, during their joint scouting patrols in the Matopos Hills, Burnham began teaching Baden-Powell woodcraft, inspiring him and giving him the plan for both the program and the code of honor of Scouting for Boys. Practiced by frontiersmen of the American Old West and indigenous peoples of the Americas, woodcraft was generally unknown to the British, but well known to the American scout Burnham. These skills eventually formed the basis of what is now called scoutcraft, the fundamentals of Scouting. Both men recognised that wars in Africa were changing markedly and the British Army needed to adapt; so during their joint scouting missions, Baden-Powell and Burnham discussed the concept of a broad training programme in woodcraft for young men, rich in exploration, tracking, fieldcraft, and self-reliance. In Africa, no scout embodied these traits more than Burnham. It was also during this time in the Matobo Hills that Baden-Powell first started to wear his signature campaign hat like the one worn by Burnham. Later, Baden-Powell wrote a number of books on Scouting, and even started to train and make use of adolescent boys, most famously during the Siege of Mafeking, during the Second Boer War.

== Scouting in Rhodesia ==
Scouting in the former Southern Rhodesia and Rhodesia and Nyasaland started in 1909 when the first Boy Scout troop was registered. Scouting grew quickly and in 1924 Rhodesia and Nyasaland sent a large contingent to the second World Scout Jamboree in Ermelunden, Denmark. The great popularity of the Boy Scout movement in Rhodesia was due to its outdoor program such as hiking, camping, cooking and pioneering, which was unusual in the protectorate. Additionally, the training and progressive badge system was targeted towards helping others, leading to responsible citizenship.

Gordon Park, a prime Scout campground and training camp, was visited by Lord Baden-Powell in 1936.

Because of the prevailing segregation in the colonial era, a separate organisation called "Pathfinders" was established for black Scouts. By the 1950s the two movements merged into one Scout Association, as did the segregated branches of the Boy Scouts of South Africa in 1977.

Rhodesia hosted the Central African Jamboree in 1959 at Ruwa.

The British contingent to the 14th World Scout Jamboree, led by Robert Baden-Powell, 3rd Baron Baden-Powell, included Scouts from Branches in Bermuda, Hong Kong and Rhodesia.

During this period, the highest earned Scout rank bore a sable antelope, the heraldic supporter of the coat of arms of Rhodesia. This motif still seems to be in use today.

== Scouting in Zimbabwe Rhodesia ==
In the 10 months the nation's name changed to Zimbabwe Rhodesia, from June 1, 1979 to April 18, 1980, a photo was taken of a group of Scouts from around the world. This photo, which features a Scout wearing a uniform emblazoned with a large Zimbabwe Rhodesia badge over the right pocket, was used for the cover of 250 Million Scouts by World Chief Scout Executive Dr. László Nagy in 1985.

== Scouting in Zimbabwe ==
In 1983, Charles A. Martin was awarded the Bronze Wolf, the only distinction of the World Organization of the Scout Movement, awarded by the World Scout Committee for exceptional services to world Scouting.

In 2009, Scouts celebrated 100 years of Scouting in Zimbabwe. Hundreds of Scouts camped at Gordon Park as part of these celebrations.

== See also ==
- Girl Guides Association of Zimbabwe
