= Mpopoma =

Mpopoma may refer to:

- Mpopoma (Kame) a river in western Zimbabwe, in Bulawayo, tributary to the Kame (Khami River)
- Mpopoma (Ove) a river in western Zimbabwe, in Matobo National Park, tributary to the Ove River (Whovi)
- Mpopoma constituency, a political subdivision and neighborhood in the city of Bulawayo
