= Scouting and Guiding in Malawi =

Scouting and Guiding associations in Malawi

The Scout and Guide movement in Malawi is served by the following organisations

- The Malawi Girl Guides Association, member of the World Association of Girl Guides and Girl Scouts
- The Scout Association of Malawi, member of the World Organization of the Scout Movement
