= Ruwa Scout Park =

Coordinates: 17°52′46″S 31°13′12″E

Ruwa Scout Park is a scouting campsite and outdoor training facility located near Ruwa, in Zimbabwe. The park serves as a venue for camping, leadership training, and community service activities organized by the Scout Association of Zimbabwe.

== Location and environment ==
Ruwa Scout Park is situated approximately 2 kilometres west of Ruwa town, on the north side of the Harare–Mutare Road, at an elevation of about 1,520–1,530 metres above sea level.

The surrounding area consists primarily of sandy miombo woodland vegetation typical of Mashonaland East Province, with nearby aquatic and riverine habitats contributing to local biodiversity.

== History ==
In 1959, Ruwa Scout Park (then commonly referred to as Ruwa Park) hosted the Central African Jamboree, a major scouting gathering organized under the national scouting movement.

Contemporary press coverage documented the event and its regional participation, describing it as one of the significant scouting gatherings held in Central Africa during that period.

The park has continued to function as a regional campsite for scout troops and provincial events, with ongoing use for national and provincial scouting activities.

== Activities ==
Ruwa Scout Park is used for:

Scout camps and outdoor training exercises

Leadership development programmes

Community service initiatives, including environmental clean-up campaigns

Preparatory activities for national and regional scouting events

Scout groups have undertaken projects at the park aimed at improving infrastructure and promoting environmental stewardship.

== See also ==
The Scout Association of Zimbabwe

Ruwa
