= Scouting and Guiding in Zimbabwe =

Scouting and Guiding associations in Zimbabwe

The Scout and Guide movement in Zimbabwe is served by

- Girl Guides Association of Zimbabwe, member of the World Association of Girl Guides and Girl Scouts
- The Boy Scouts Association of Zimbabwe, member of the World Organization of the Scout Movement
