= Pierre Consigny =

French government official and politician (1930–2024)

President of the French Red Cross
- In office 1994–1997
- Preceded by: André Delaude
- Succeeded by: Marc Gentilini

Director of the Monnaie de Paris
- In office 1992–1995
- Preceded by: Nicolas Saudray
- Succeeded by: Emmanuel Constans

Member of the General Council of Orne
- In office 1974–1988

Mayor of La Ferrière-Béchet
- In office March 1983 – June 1995
- Succeeded by: Azer Coupry

Personal details
- Born: Pierre François Marie Jean Consigny; 12 February 1930 Mondeville, France
- Died: 7 September 2024 (aged 94)
- Party: CDS
- Education: Sciences Po; Yale University; École nationale d'administration
- Occupation: Government official

Pierre François Marie Jean Consigny (12 February 1930 – 7 September 2024) was a French government official and politician of the Centre of Social Democrats (CDS).

== Biography ==
Born in Mondeville on 12 February 1930, Consigny was the son of colonel René Consigny and Marie-Thérèse Pasquier. He was also the grandson of Louis Henri Consigny, the director of the École polytechnique. He earned degrees in law and letters from the Sciences Po and Yale University. He also attended the École nationale d'administration. After his education, he became a project manager for the cabinets of Maurice Couve de Murville and Albin Chalandon.

Consigny briefly entered politics, serving in the General Council of Orne from 1974 to 1988 and was mayor of La Ferrière-Béchet from 1983 to 1995. He then served as director of the Monnaie de Paris from 1992 to 1995 and was president of the French Red Cross from 1994 to 1997.

Consigny was the father of actress Anne Consigny, artist and scenographer Pascale Consigny, and advertising professional Thierry Consigny. He was also the grandfather of lawyer and writer Charles Consigny and actor Vladimir Consigny.

Consigny died on 7 September 2024, at the age of 94.

== Publication ==
- La France et sa monnaie : un chemin de mémoire (2001)

== Distinctions ==
- Officer of the Legion of Honour (1991)
- Commander of the Ordre national du Mérite (1996)
