= Coralie Cahen =

French sculptor (1832–1899)

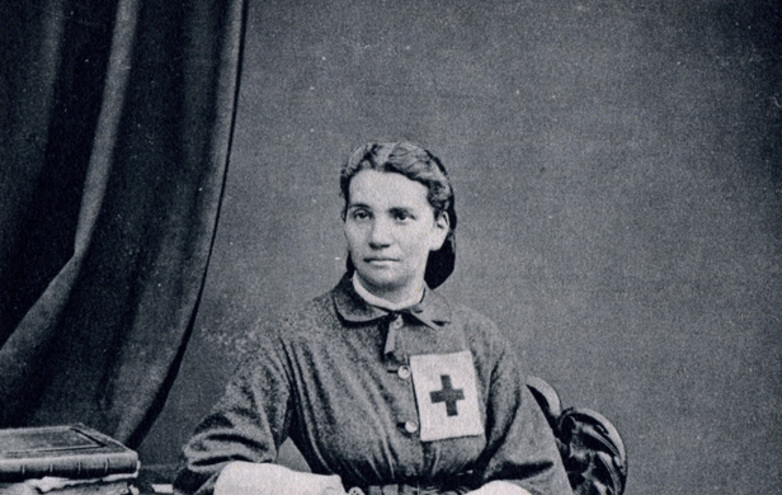
Coralie Cahen, c. 1870; photograph by Frédéric Boissonnas

Coralie Cahen (née Coralie Lévy; 21 June 1832 – 12 March 1899) was a French philanthropist and sculptor.

Coralie Lévy was born in Nancy in 1832 to a French-Jewish family. At the age of 19 she married Mayer Cahen (1823–1866), a doctor at the Rothschild Hospital, Paris and chief physician of the Chemin de Fer du Nord railway company. They had one daughter, Lucie, who died young.

In 1866 she was involved in founding the "Maison Israélite de Refuge pour l'Enfance", an orphanage for Jewish girls at Romainville (relocated in 1883 to Neuilly-sur-Seine). In particular the refuge sought to provide an escape for young Jewish prostitutes from the 5th arrondissement of Paris.

At the outbreak of the Franco-Prussian War in 1870, Cahen became a central committee member of the "Dames de la Société de Secours aux Blessés Militaires" ("Ladies Committee of the Society to Aid the War-Wounded") (SSBM). Based at Metz, she developed an ambulance service dedicated to non-commissioned officers and ordinary soldiers (officers had their own service). She continued this work even while Metz was besieged (August–October 1870). Léon Gambetta then French Minister of the Interior, subsequently requested her to support the Army of the Loire, she took on the management of the hospital at Vendôme.

In the following years, Cahen interested herself in the fate of French war prisoners. She visited 66 Prussian prisons where they were detained, and pleaded personally with the Empress Augusta of Prussia for their release. In 1872, when the Prussian government was refusing to cooperate on this issue, Cahen discovered in Berlin 59,000 files on the prisoners, and succeeded in getting these transmitted to Paris; this was the first news available in France on many of those who had been captured.

The SSBM recognized Cahen's activities with reluctance and its Ladies Committee was disbanded after the war. In 1879 she joined and became Vice-President of the "Association des Dames Françaises" of the French Red Cross. It was not until 1888 that Cahen was awarded the "Légion d'Honneur" for her war work. By then her work was chiefly centred on child protection and education.

Cahen also became interested in sculpture during the 1870s and created a number of works, including a bust of the French chief rabbi, Zadoc Kahn.

Her funeral in 1899 was accompanied in her honour by a detachment of infantry.
