= French Red Cross =

Humanitarian non-governmental organization in France

- Croix-Rouge française
- Logo of the French Red Cross
- Formation: May 25, 1864; 161 years ago
- Founder: Henri Dunant
- Purpose: Humanitarian aid
- Headquarters: Paris, France
- Region served: France
- President: Philippe Da Costa
- Website: www.croix-rouge.fr

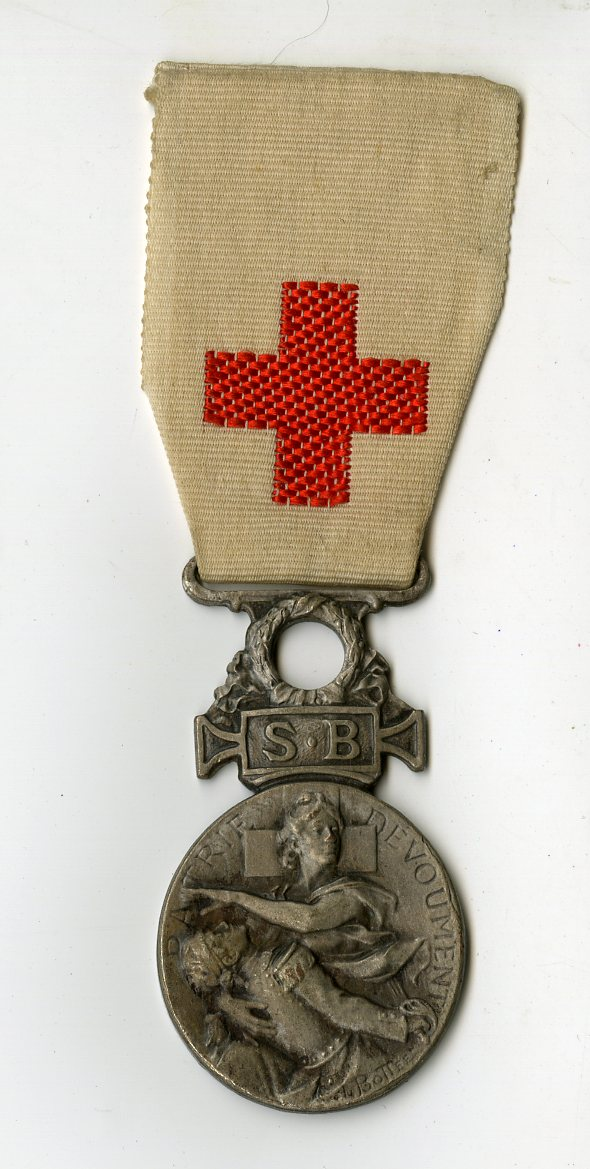
Medal of the SSBM (1916)

The French Red Cross (French: Croix-Rouge française), or the CRF, is the national Red Cross Society in France founded in 1864 and originally known as the Société française de secours aux blessés militaires (SSBM). Recognized as a public utility since 1945, the French Red Cross is one of the 191 national societies of the International Red Cross and Red Crescent Movement. It has more than 62,000 volunteers and 17,000 employees. Its network consists of 1,062 local offices, 108 departmental and territorial delegations and 634 social, medico-social and health establishments throughout France, including the overseas departments and territories.

== History ==
=== Leaders ===
Société de Secours aux blessés militaires (SSBM)

- 1864–1869: Anatole de Montesquiou-Fezensac
- 1869–1870: Charles-Marie-Augustin de Goyon
- 1870–1873: Maurice de Flavigny
- 1873–1886: Duc de Nemours
- 1887–1893: Patrice de Mac-Mahon
- 1893–1897: Duc d'Aumale
- 1897–1903: Léopold Davout d'Auerstaedt
- 1903–1916: Melchior de Vogüé
- 1916–1918: Louis Renault
- 1918–1932: Paul Pau
- 1932–1940: Edmond de Lillers

Comité des Dames de la Société de Secours aux blessés militaires (CDSSBM)

- 1867–1869: Madame la maréchale Niel
- 1869–1883: Comtesse de Flavigny
- 1883–1889: Princesse Czartoriska (fille du duc de Nemours)
- 1889–1898: Élisabeth de Mac Mahon
- 1898–1907: Duchesse de Reggio
- 1907–1923: Comtesse d'Haussonville
- 1923–1926: Magdeleine Guillemin (1853-1930), marquise de Montebello
- 1926–1939: Inès de Bourgoing
- 1939–1940: Mlle d'Haussonville

Association des Dames de France (ADF)

- 1879: Dr. Duchaussoy. Vice-President: Coralie Cahen.
- 1880–1906: Countess Foucher de Careil
- 1907–1913: Madame l'amirale Jaurès
- 1913–1925: Madame Ernest Carnot
- 1925–1940: Comtesse de Galard
- From 1940: Madame Maurice de Wendel

Union des Femmes de France (UFF)

- 1881–1906: Madame Koechlin Schwartz
- 1906–1921: Madame Suzanne Pérouse
- 1921–1927: Madame Henri Galli
- 1927–1938: Madame Barbier Hugo
- 1938–1940: Madeleine Saint-René Taillandier

French Red Cross

- 1940–1941: Pr. Louis Pasteur Vallery-Radot
- 1941–1942: Pr. Bazy
- 1942–1944: Gabriel de Mun
- 1944–1945: Jacques de Bourbon Busset
- 1945: Pr. Louis Justin Besançon (vice-president) Louis Milliot)
- 1946–1947: Médecin Général Inspecteur Sice
- 1947–1955: Georges Brouardel
- 1955–1967: André François-Poncet
- 1967–1969: Raymond Debenedetti
- 1969–1978: Marcellin Carraud
- 1979–1983: Jean-Marie Soutou
- 1984–1989: Louis Dauge
- 1989–1992: Georgina Dufoix
- 1992—1994: André Delaude
- 1994–1997: Pierre Consigny
- 1997–2003: Pr. Marc Gentilini
- 2004–2013: Pr. Jean-François Mattei
- 2013-2021: Pr. Jean-Jacques Eledjam
- 2021-present: Philippe Da Costa
