= Philippe Da Costa =

Former president of French Red Cross and scouting leader (born 1962)

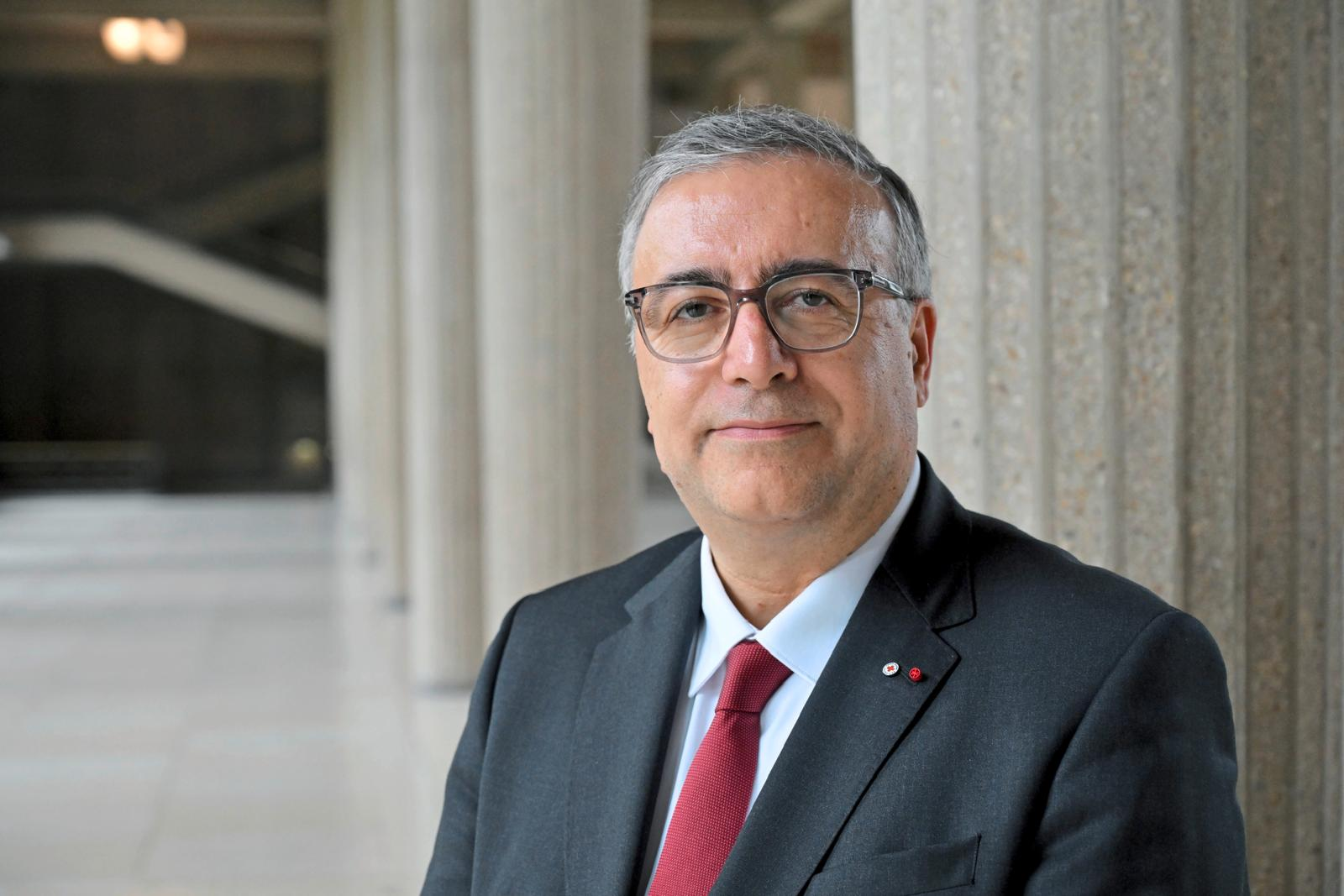

Chairman, World Scout Committee
- In office 1 March 2008 – July 2008
- Preceded by: Herman Hui
- Succeeded by: Rick Cronk

Philippe Da Costa (born 7 December 1962) served as the president of the World Scout Committee and as the Commissaire général (General Commissioner) of the Scouts de France from 1995 to 2002. He is currently the national president of the French Red Cross and a member of the Economic, Social and Environmental Council. In May 2008, he was appointed president of the National Institute of Youth and Popular Education (INJEP).

== Background ==
Da Costa was elected a member of the World Scout Committee for a term of six years. His election was held in July 2002 at the Thessaloniki World Scout Conference. He was elected vice-president at the World Scout Conference in Tunisia in September 2005. He became president of the World Scout Committee on 1 March 2008 following the resignation of Herman Hui. His term ended in July 2008 on the island of Jeju in Korea.

The World Scout Committee appointed Da Costa to serve as a liaison to the external Scout body World Scout Parliamentary Union.

In 2010, he was awarded the 322nd Bronze Wolf, the only distinction of the World Organization of the Scout Movement, awarded by the World Scout Committee for exceptional services to world Scouting.

Da Costa is a Doctor of Social Sciences, married and the father of three daughters.

World Organization of the Scout Movement
Preceded by Herman Hui	Chairman, World Scout Committee; 2008	Succeeded by Rick Cronk
