= Bambata Cave =

Prehistoric archaeological site in Zimbabwe

Coordinates: 20°30′12″S 28°24′22″E

Bambata Cave is one of the Southern Africa prehistoric sites situated in Motobo National Park along with Inanke, Nswatugi, Pomengwe and Silozwane caves in Zimbabwe.

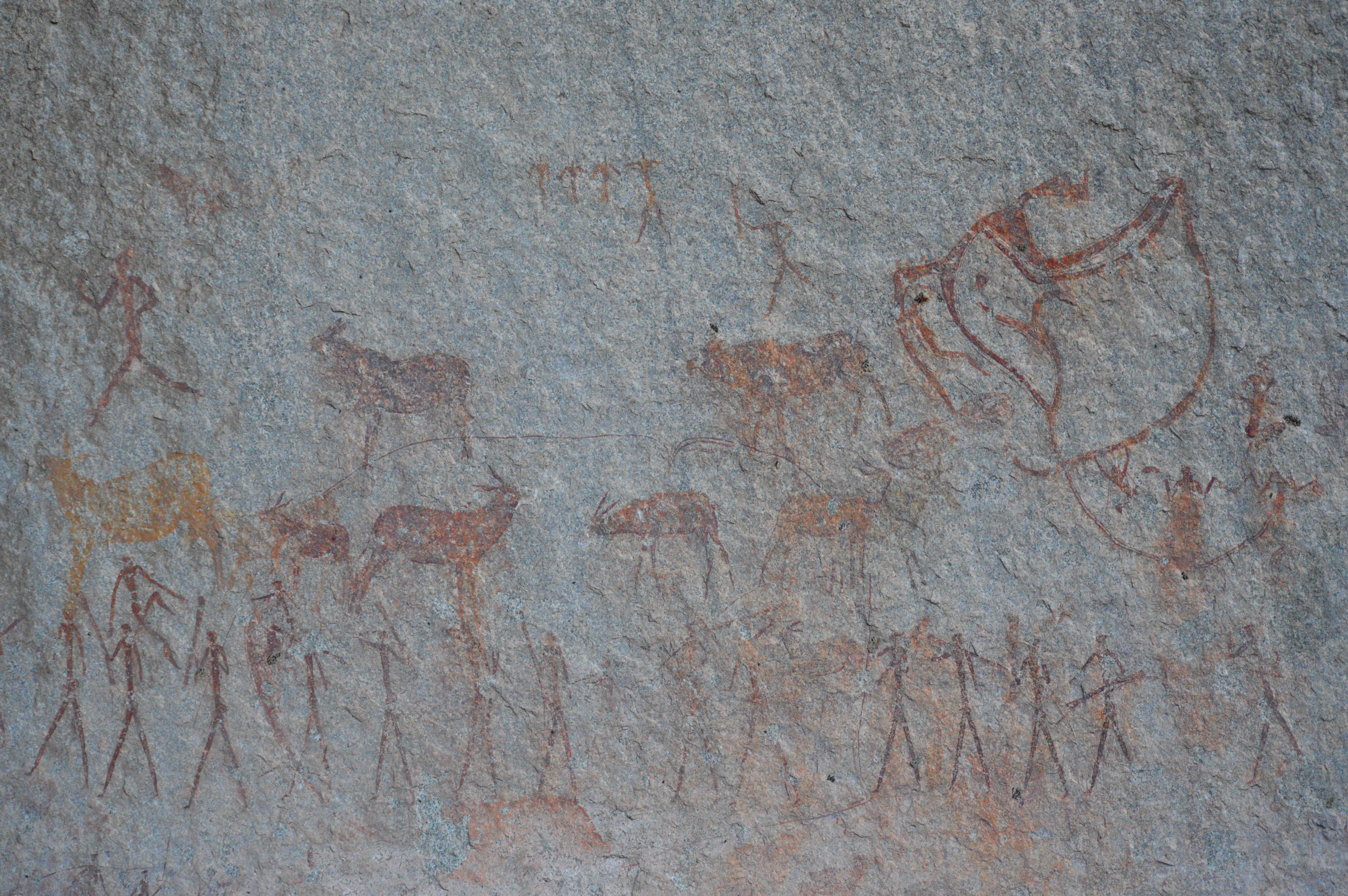

== Location ==
The Bambata cave is a huge archaeological cave located in the west part of the Motobo National Park and in the north side of the game park on the Kezi-Bulawayo road. The cave takes its name from the Bambata Mountain, a dome-shaped granite mountain which is located in the north-west of this region and is one of the highest hills in Western Matopos. Bambata cave is situated approximately 300 ft (91 m) below the summit on the eastern side of the Bambata Hill. The cave is invisible from the surrounding valleys and the hill summit.

== First excavations ==
In 1918, George Arnold and Neville Jones started initial examinations in the cave with great difficulties. An area of 4 ft (1.2 m) deep, 16 ft (4.9 m) long, 6 ft (1.8 m) wide was found at the back side of the cave and two smaller holes on the east and west sides. The surface of the cave covered with a grey ash-powder layer and the entrance was blocked by a thicket of thorns which made the inside darker. After clearing away the bushes, a more precise examination was done on the floor of the cave. Several Wilton type scrapers, 1-2 crescents in jasper and white quartz, pieces of pottery polished brown to black were found here. Wilton type scrapers and polished black and brown pottery samples were found in the top layer of the cave that required extreme caution.

Traces of hyrax, antelope, and several mammals have also been found during excavations. Animal paintings on the walls prove that Bambata residents were hunters.

After the digging was completed, the camp named "Paradise Camp" was established on 7 June 1929. The methodology of the excavation was conducted by Leslie Armstrong and Major T.A.

The artefacts were delivered from the excavation site to the camp, in the evenings they were washed and re-grouped. About 7 hours was scheduled for working in the cave per day. Armstrong was mainly dealing with following the paintings on the wall, marking the collected artefacts and sometimes their sorting during the excavations period:

“After careful consideration, I have decided to term the industry represented by the artefacts derived from the thickest deposit in the cave, amounting to over 10 feet, "Bambata Culture."

== Cultural layers ==
The artefacts found in the cave are categories into different cultures based on the layers discovered in Area 1 and Area 2 of Bambata cave. Area 1 has layers called Grey ash layer (surface to 6 inches), Upper cave-earth (from 6 inches to 10 feet 6 inches), 10-foot 6-inch level, Lower cave earth (13 feet 6 inches).

=== Area 1 ===
==== Grey ash layer ====
Grey ash layer is characterized by the artefacts of Wilton Industry. As being close to the surface, few samples were found including microlithic scrapers, besides crescent and triangularly shaped tools, shell beads and bone equipment, small burins. Presence of pencils and small balls of hematite and red ochre shows that the inhabitants used them for painting.

==== Upper cave-earth ====
Shell beads and microlithic, as well as Wilton tools were found in this layer. The artefacts became more elementary in character and technique as it is approached the end of this layer. The artefacts in different colours, moreover, other types of raw coloring materials, such as yellow ochre, pencils, pieces of red and brown hematites and ochres, were found. It's supposed that ochres were used to paint the body and walls.

==== 10-feet 6-inch level ====
The next layer is characterised by the Mousterian Industry. Tools made of igneous rock, milky quartz, chalcedony, as well as choppers, hand-axes were found in this layer.

==== Lower Cave-earth ====
This layer is full of fragile granites and pieces of milky quartz. Most of them were supposedly used as scrapers or knives. Oval tools made of semi-transparent quartz and early forms of cleavers were found here. The cleaver revealed in Bambata cave has not been noticed in the Lower Paleolithic series of Europe.

=== Area 2 ===
Area 2 was detached from Area by a wall which had 12 inches thick at the surface and 24 inches at its base. Wilton level, Upper cave-earth, 12-feet level, 16-feet 6-inch level were noticed in this area.

- Wilton level is more precise in Area 2 comparing with Area 1. The layer consisted of grey ash with a total thickness of 18 inches. Spalls and fragments of desquamated granite together with artefacts formed a pebble bed representing the heavy leftover from the surface eroded by wind. Camp fires were built by Wilton people upon these peddle-beds, and as a result, the older floor extended on the back side of the cave and became deeper.
- Upper Cave-earth. Artefacts found here were similar to the ones found in Upper Cave-earth layer of Area 1.
- 12-feet level. Mousterian industry. In the upper layer, the remnants were in the same type with the tools found in the Mousterian level of Area 1. In lower areas, brown sandy insoluble materials containing quartz and feldspar crystals, as well as fragments of white tufaceous. Wood ash or charcoal was not noticed here.
- 16-feet 6-inch level. This level is characterized by Acheulean types of tools. The two-faced stone hand axes revealed here at 16-17.5 feet on the south side. Saucer shaped pocket of black loamy earth and fragments of charcoal were found in this layer.

== Bambata Ware ==
Bambata Ware was first revealed in the Bambata cave, but it was also found at Dombozanga Rock Shelter near the Beitbridge, Tshangula Cave in the Matopo Hills and Gondongwe Cave in Chibi district. The artefacts were found among the samples of Wilton industry and Later Stone Age tools. Bambata pottery is a part of Bambata ware. The remnants of this culture and decorative stones play an important role in studying the archaeology of Zimbabwe. Though Bambata pottery itself was first recorded by Arnold and Jones in 1918 and 1919, its origins and associations started to be investigated after Jones's (1940) and Schofield's (1941) researches. Bambata pottery is associated with the Later Stone Age and the Iron Age. Pottery materials dated back 2100 B.P and known for the thinness of the samples, stamp decoration, crenellated lips and unusualness of herringbone patterns.

== See also ==
- Matobo National Park – National park in Zimbabwe
- History of Zimbabwe
- List of caves
