= Charles A. Martin =

Scouting commissioner and leader

International Commissioner of the Scout Association of Rhodesia

Charles A. Martin served as the Chief Scout of the Boy Scouts of South Africa and also International Commissioner of the Scout Association of Rhodesia, which has since become the Scout Association of Zimbabwe.

In 1983, Martin was awarded the 165th Bronze Wolf, the only distinction of the World Organization of the Scout Movement, awarded by the World Scout Committee for exceptional services to world Scouting.

World Organization of the Scout Movement
Preceded by Carveth Geach	Chief Scout, Boy Scouts of South Africa; 1973–1978	Succeeded by Colin Inglis
