= Colin Inglis =

Chief Scout of the Boy Scouts of South Africa
- In office 1977–1985
- Preceded by: Charles A. Martin
- Succeeded by: Garnet de la Hunt

Colin James Inglis (1928-2005) served as the Chief Scout and the International Commissioner of the Boy Scouts of South Africa, and was the creator of the National Senior Scout Adventure.

In 1968, Inglis, the Western Cape Divisional Commissioner at the time, called a meeting to discuss the loss of 15- and 16-year-old Scouts, which usually happened before they achieved their First Class badge. He felt that once a Scout had reached the age of 16, troop activities were no longer an adventure for them and as a result they left Scouting. He suggested that an adventure activity be held for 16-year-old Scouts who had obtained their First Class badge, which could be the height of their Scouting careers. The meeting set up a small committee to run an event late in 1969. The rest of the year was spent organizing the location in the Cederberg, testing communications, hiring school buses, and finding activity leaders. This first adventure was open only to Scouts from the Western Cape, but it was so successful that subsequent events were opened to Scouts from all over South Africa. Inglis continued to organize adventures in 1988, 1990, 1992 and 1994.

In 1996, Inglis was awarded the 249th Bronze Wolf, the only distinction of the World Organization of the Scout Movement, awarded by the World Scout Committee for exceptional services to world Scouting.

World Organization of the Scout Movement
Preceded by Charles A. Martin	Chief Scout, Boy Scouts of South Africa; 1977–1985	Succeeded by Garnet de la Hunt
