= Garnet de la Hunt =

Chairman, World Scout Committee
- In office 1999–2002
- Preceded by: Abdourahmane Sow
- Succeeded by: Marie-Louise Correa

Personal details
- Born: 25 August 1933
- Died: 28 April 2014 (aged 80)

Herbert William Garnet de la Hunt GCOB (25 August 1933 – 28 April 2014) served as the Chief Scout of the Boy Scouts of South Africa, as well as the Vice-Chairman of the Africa Scout Committee, and was the first South African to be elected to the World Scout Committee, a member from 1996 to 2002 and held the post of chairman of the committee. In 1994, de la Hunt was awarded the 234th Bronze Wolf, the only distinction of the World Organization of the Scout Movement, awarded by the World Scout Committee for exceptional services to world Scouting. On 27 April 2013 he received the Order of the Baobab.

World Organization of the Scout Movement
Preceded by Abdourahmane Sow	Chairman, World Scout Committee; 1999–2002	Succeeded by Marie-Louise Correa
Preceded by Colin Inglis	Chief Scout, Boy Scouts of South Africa; 1985–1995	Succeeded by Nkwenkwe Nkomo
