= Marie-Louise Correa =

Senegalese politician and doctor

Chair, World Scout Committee
- In office 2002–2005
- Preceded by: Garnet de la Hunt
- Succeeded by: Herman Hui

Marie-Louise Correa (born 26 November 1943 in Dakar) is a Senegalese politician, a doctor and former minister of the Senegalese government, who was elected in July 2002 as president of the World Scout Committee following the 36th World Scout Conference in Thessaloníki, Greece, from 2002 to 2005. She had served as chair of the Africa Scout Region until 1999.

== Background ==
Correa is married and the mother of four children.

World Organization of the Scout Movement
Preceded by Garnet de la Hunt	Chair, World Scout Committee; 2002–2005	Succeeded by Herman Hui
