= Pomongwe Cave =

Cave located in Zimbabwe

Coordinates: 20°32′52″S 28°30′48″E

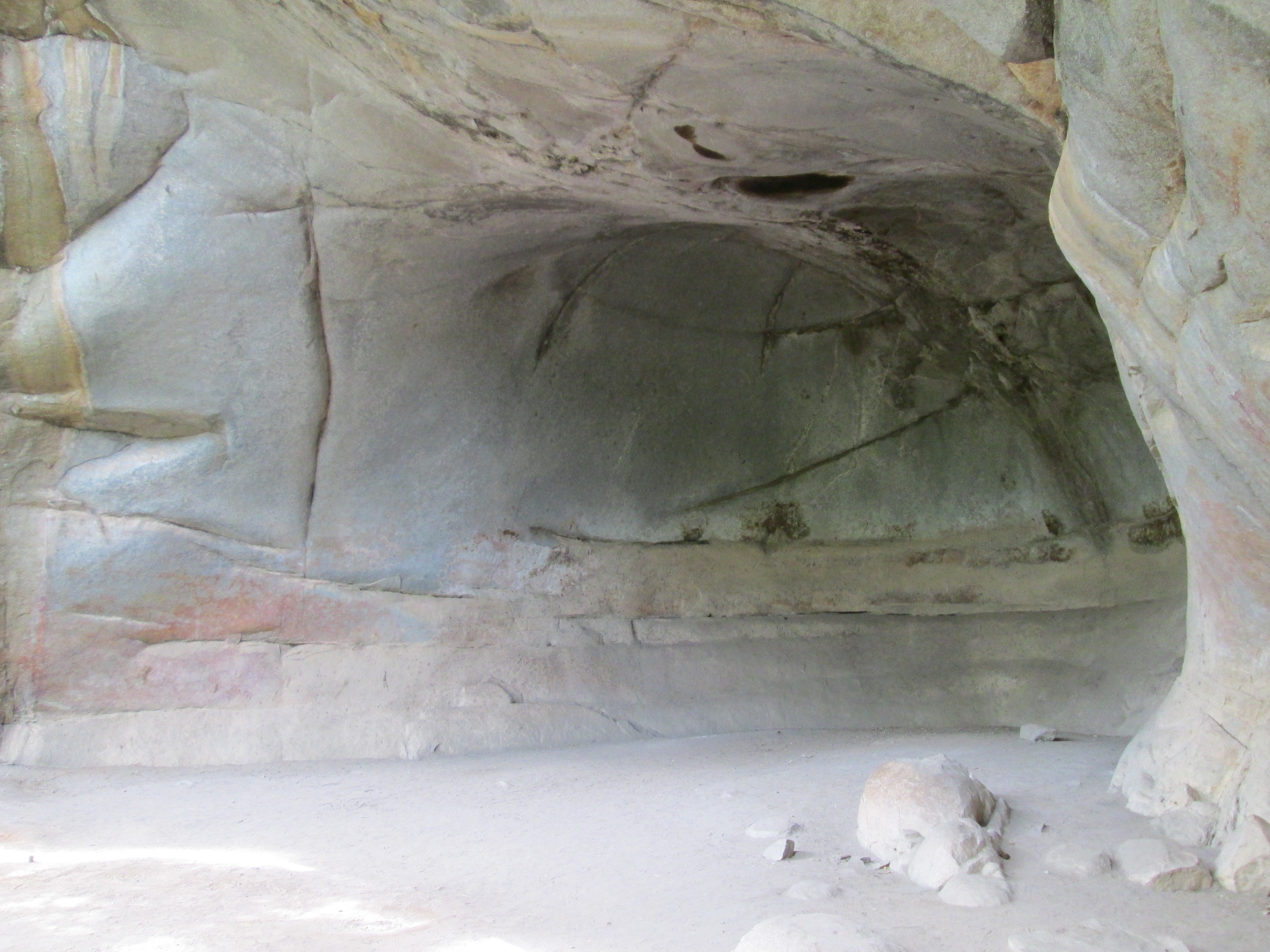
Pomongwe cave

Pomongwe Cave is a cave and rock art site in Zimbabwe, located inside the Matobo National Park, one kilometer east of Maleme Dam. The cave, formed by negative exfoliation, lays the end of a small valley facing northeast. It is 20m long and 20 wide. The name Pomongwe is derived from the Kalanga word for 'melon' referring to the dome shaped hill.

== Usage, findings and excavations ==
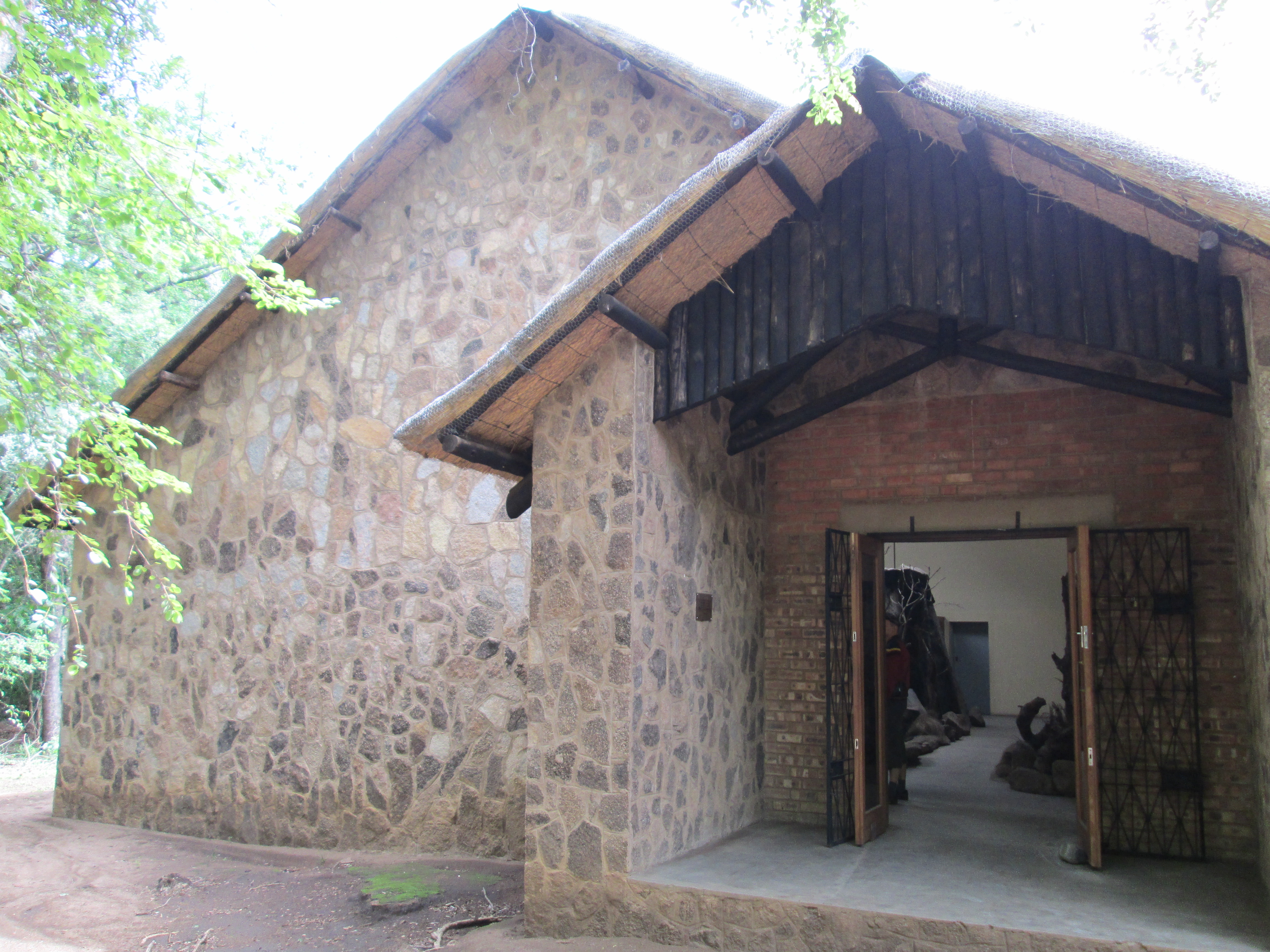
Pomongwe cave site museum and interpretive center

The cave was used by Stone Age people, possibly Middle Stone age because of the rare, prepared cores and triangular points present in the cave. The several excavations done in 1960–1962 and in 1979 suggest that there is a possibility that it was a communal area.

== Rock art paintings ==
The site has visible rock art paintings of giraffe, zebra, kudu, eland as well as two outlined elephants, even though it was destroyed by misguided preservation efforts in the 1920s that saw linseed oil being applied on the paintings. Also visible are images of women, geometric shapes and paintings associated with agriculturalists. Near the cave is a site museum and interpretive center that was opened on the 1st of July 1994.

== National monument status ==
Although the cave is a well known site and is frequently visited, unfortunately was never proclaimed as a national monument, due to the fact that the rock art found was of insufficient quality to justify its proclamation.

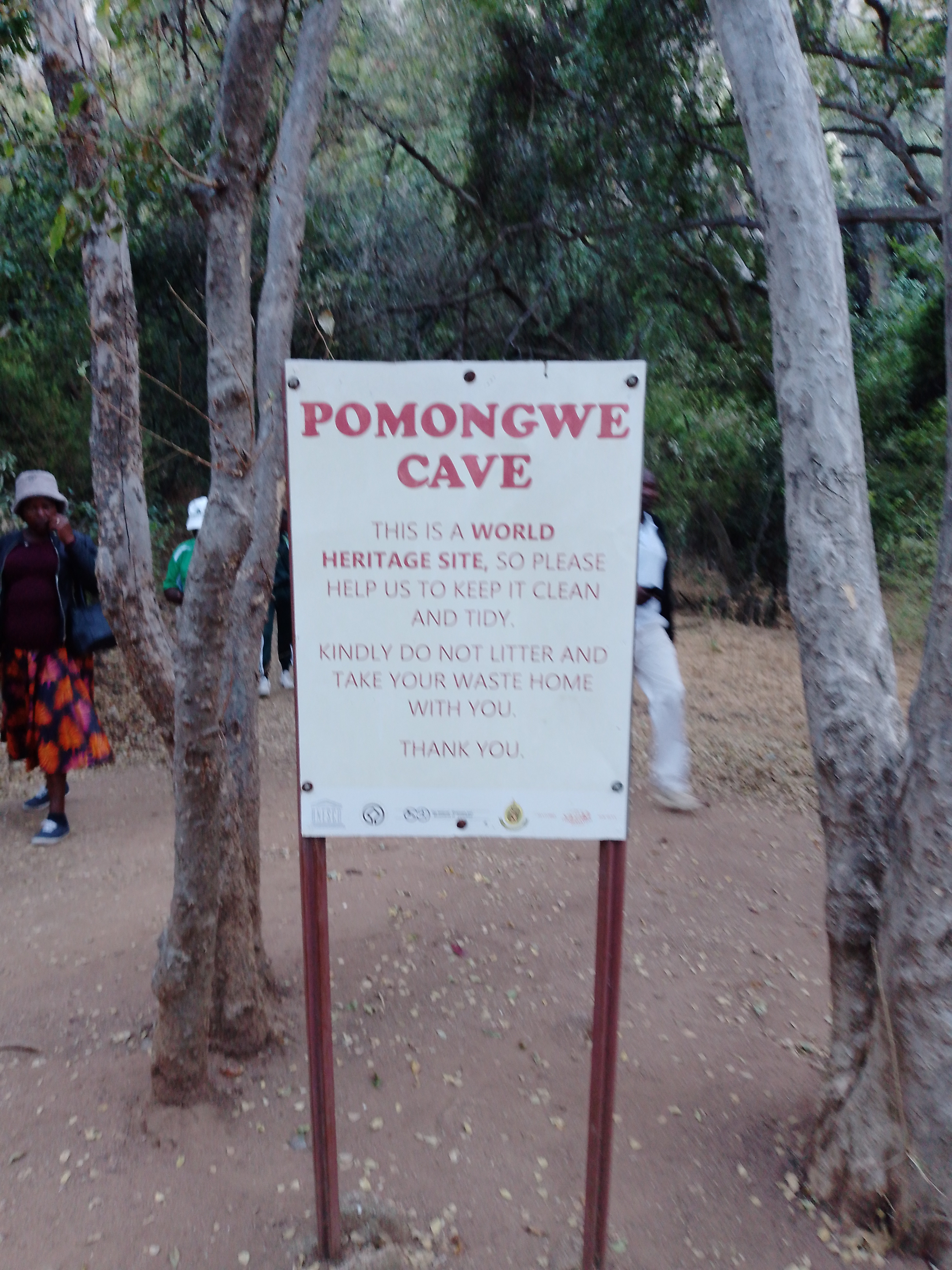
National Monument Site
