= Herman Hui =

Former chairman of the World Scout Committee

- Born: 1951 (age 74–75); Hong Kong
- Occupation: Lawyer

Hui Chung-shing (Chinese: 許宗盛), BBS, MH, JP (born 1951), anglicised as Herman Hui, is a professional lawyer in Hong Kong at the WONG, HUI & CO.

He is also the former chairman of the World Scout Committee, the executive board for the World Organization of the Scout Movement from 2005 to 2008.

He worked as a legal advisor for governmental boards and committees, and Director of the Glorious Sun investment company. He received the Medal of Honour, an honorary Justice of the Peace appointment and the Bronze Wolf award for his contributions to social welfare in Hong Kong and his contributions to Scouting worldwide.

== Career ==
Hui was born and lives in Hong Kong. He was educated at Ying Wa College, and later earned a Bachelor of Law degree from the University of Hong Kong. Following his studies, he was admitted to the Supreme Courts in Hong Kong (1976), the UK (1983) and Victoria, Australia (1985), and afterwards has been in private practice. In his legal function, he participates in governmental advisory boards and committees of the Government of Hong Kong, including

- Advisory Committee for the Support of the Employment of People with Disability (創業軒, SEPD), an activity organised by the Social Welfare Department,
- Guardianship Board of the Health, Welfare and Food Bureau,
- Social Welfare Advisory Committee of the Health, Welfare and Food Bureau.

In 2000, Hui was awarded the Medal of Honour by the Government of Hong Kong, and on 2004-07-01 he was appointed to the honorary title of Justice of the Peace.

After being the external legal advisor of the Glorious Sun Enterprises, a 3.8 billion Hong Kong dollars (US$500 million) investment holding company focusing on casual apparel, he joined the group in 1995 as an executive director. He is also managing director of Everight Consultants Ltd.

In July 2024, Hui was selected by the Hong Kong government as chief of the Social Workers Registration Board.

Hui is married and has one child.

== Scouting ==
Hui Chung-shing has been participating in Scouting since he was a first form student in the secondary school, Ying Wa College. He started as Boy Scout with the school's 13th Hong Kong Group, which is now the 75th Kowloon Group of the Scout Association of Hong Kong. He was also the Group Scout Leader in the Scout Group. He later served as the Deputy Regional Commissioner and Assistant Chief Commissioner (International & Public Relations), actively involved in social action projects of the Scout Association of Hong Kong, initiating exchange Scouts in Hong Kong and the mainland China. He was the Deputy Chief Commissioner before retired as a uniformed scout member.

Hui was chairman of the Asia-Pacific Scout Committee from 1998 to 2001, and he was member of the World Organization of the Scout Movement (WOSM) Strategy Task Force. During the term in 2000, Hui was awarded the Bronze Wolf award for his strong support to Scouting. In 2002, he was elected as a member of the World Scout Committee, the executive body of the World Organization of the Scout Movement, for a period of six years. During the 37th World Scout Conference in Tunisia in 2005, Hui was elected to be chairman of the committee.

Hui resigned his position on the World Scout Committee and was succeeded by Philippe Da Costa in 2008.

== See also ==
World Organization of the Scout Movement
Preceded by Marie-Louise Correa	Chairman, World Scout Committee; 2005–2008	Succeeded by Philippe Da Costa
