= Matobo National Park =

National park in Zimbabwe

- IUCN category II (national park)
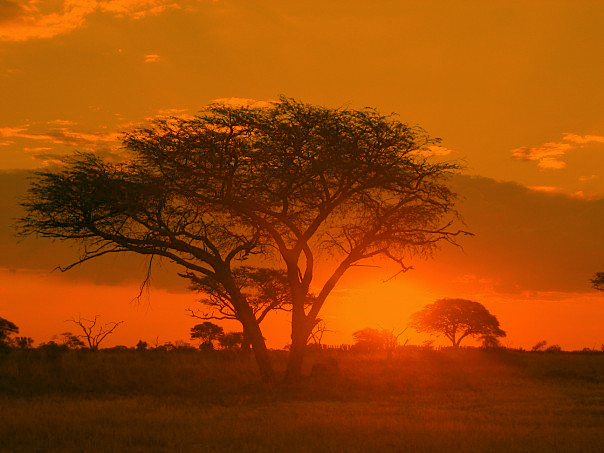
- Sunrise in Matobo National Park, 2006
- Interactive map of Matobo National Park
- Location: Matobo District, Zimbabwe
- Nearest city: Bulawayo
- Coordinates: 20°33′00″S 28°30′29″E
- Area: 424 km^{2} (164 sq mi)
- Established: 1926
- Governing body: Zimbabwe Parks and Wildlife Management Authority

UNESCO World Heritage Site
- Official name: Matobo Hills
- Type: Cultural
- Criteria: iii, v, vi
- Designated: 2003 (27th session)
- Reference no.: 306
- Region: Africa

The Matobo National Park forms the core of the Matobo or Matopos Hills, an area of granite kopjes and wooded valleys commencing some 35 kilometres (22 mi) south of Bulawayo, southern Zimbabwe. The hills were formed over 2 billion years ago with granite being forced to the surface; it has eroded to produce smooth "whaleback dwalas" and broken kopjes, strewn with boulders and interspersed with thickets of vegetation. Matopo/Matob was named by the Lozwi. A different tradition states that the first King, Mzilikazi Khumalo when told by the local residents that the great granite domes were called madombo he replied, possible half jest, "We will call them matobo" - an Isindebele play on 'Bald heads'.

The Hills cover an area of about 3,100 km^{2} (1,200 sq mi), of which 424 km^{2} (164 sq mi) is National Park, the remainder being largely communal land and a small proportion of commercial farmland. The park extends along the Thuli, Mtshelele, Maleme and Mpopoma river valleys. Part of the national park is set aside as a 100 km^{2} (39 sq mi) game park, which has been stocked with game including the white rhinoceros. The highest point in the hills is the promontory named Gulati (1,549 m; 5,082 ft) just outside the north-eastern corner of the park.

Administratively, Matobo National Park incorporates the Lake Matopos Recreational Park, being the area around Hazelside, Sandy Spruit and Lake Matopos.

The national park is located within the southern Africa bushveld ecoregion.

== History ==
The national park is the oldest in Zimbabwe, established in 1926 as Rhodes Matopos National Park, a bequest from Cecil Rhodes. The original park borders extended well to the south and east of the current park. These areas were redesignated for settlement as part of a compromise between the colonial authorities and the local people, creating the Khumalo and Matobo Communal Lands. The park area then increased with the acquisition of World's View and Hazelside farms to the north.

The current name Matobo reflects the correct vernacular pronunciation of the area.

The Matobo Hills were designated as a UNESCO World Heritage Site in 2003. The area "exhibits a profusion of distinctive rock landforms rising above the granite shield that covers much of Zimbabwe".

== Features ==
=== Fauna ===
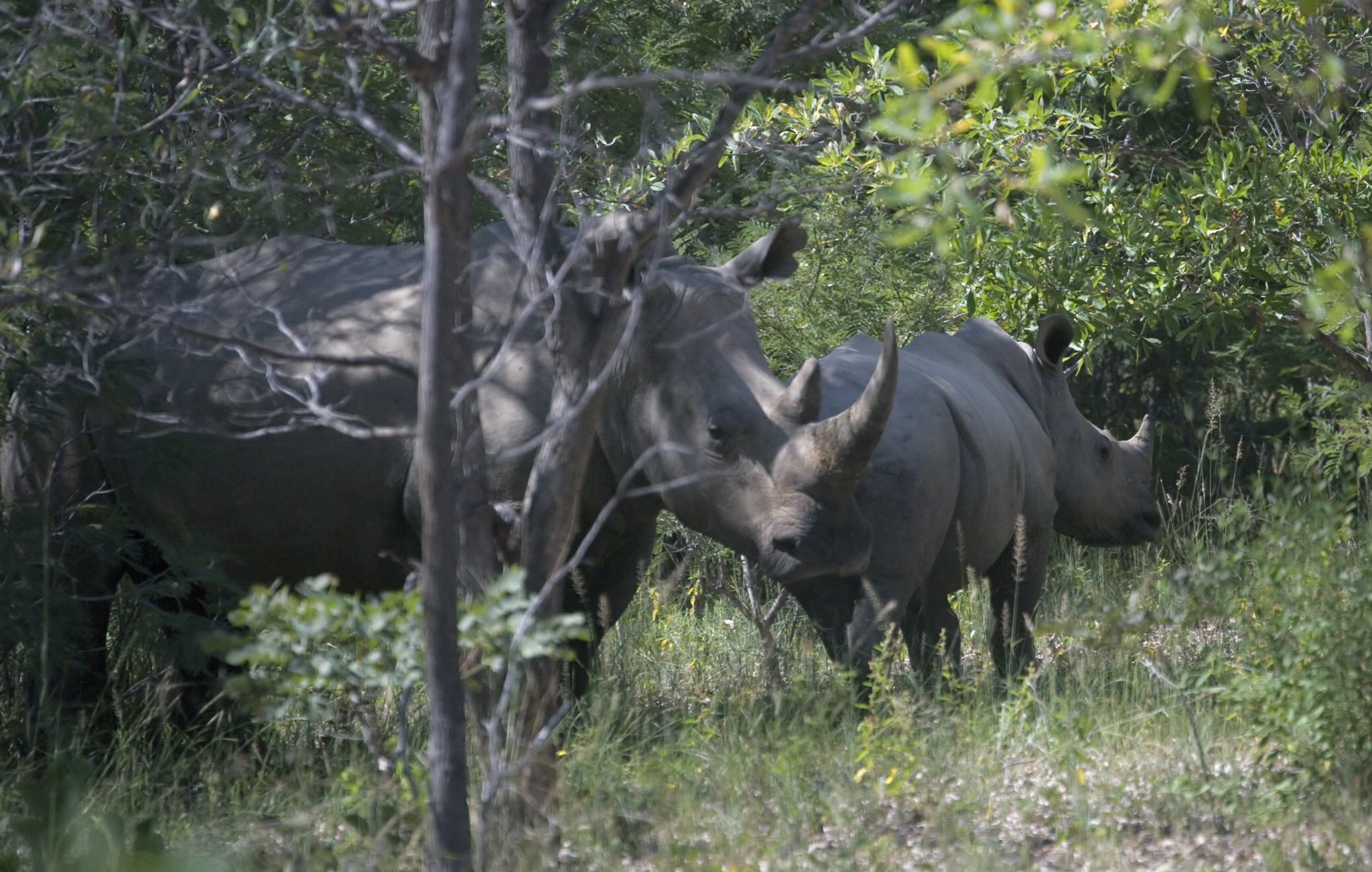
White rhino and calf in the game park, Matobo National Park

Matobo National Park has a wide diversity of fauna: 175 bird, 88 mammal, 39 snake and 16 fish species. Game include white rhinos, sable antelopes, impala and leopards. The park contains the world's densest population of the latter, due to the abundance of hyrax, which make up 50% of their diet. The game park in the west has been restocked with white and black rhinos, the former from KwaZulu-Natal in the 1960s and the latter from the Zambezi Valley in the 1990s. It has been designated as an Intensive Protection Zone for the two species, as well as hyenas, hippopotamuses, giraffes, zebras, wildebeests and ostriches.

Matobo National Park contains the highest concentration of black eagles, and breeding pairs of these birds, worldwide.

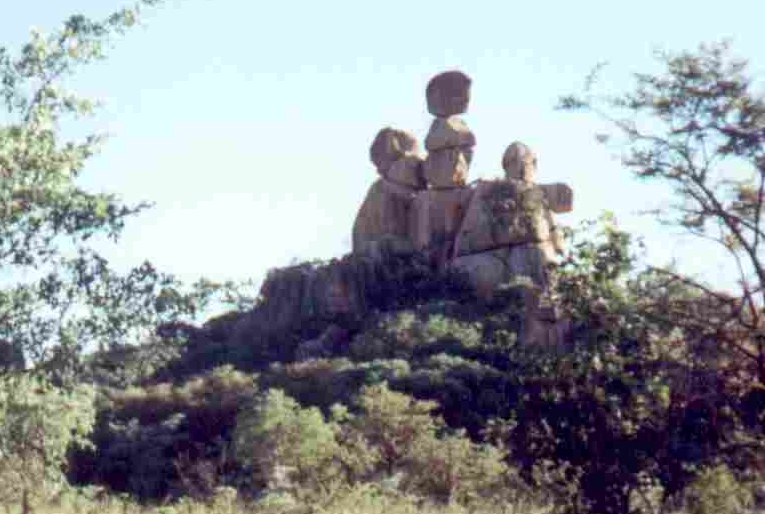
Mother and Child Kopje in the game park, Matobo National Park

A limnological research centre has operated since 1950 at the Maleme Dam and researched species such as the yellow-fish, Barbus mattozi.

=== Flora ===
The Matobo Hills is an area of high botanic diversity, with over 200 species of tree recorded in the national park, including the mountain acacia, wild pear and the paperbark acacia. There are also many aloes, wild herbs and over 100 grass species. Many types of rare endemic plants have been recorded.

=== Fungi ===
Matobo National Park is home to a diverse array of fungi, which play a critical role in the ecosystem. These organisms, including saprophytic and mycorrhizal species, decompose organic matter, recycle nutrients, and support plant health through symbiotic relationships. Fungi enhance soil fertility and structure, contributing to the stability of the park's unique granite landscapes. Additionally, they serve as a vital food source for various insects and small mammals, further enriching the park's biodiversity. Certain species of fungi found in the park are also collected and consumed by local communities, showcasing their cultural and ecological significance. The presence of fungi underscores the interconnectedness of flora and fauna in this ecologically rich environment.

=== Geography and geology ===
The Matobo Hills are composed entirely of granite, making up the Matopos Batholith. The granite weathers into fantastic shapes, such as the balancing rocks known as Mother and Child Kopje. Between the granite mountains, narrow valleys form. These are often swampy valleys known as dambos or vleis, due to runoff from the whaleback mountains. These valleys form the headwaters of the Maleme, Mpopoma and Mtsheleli rivers, and the source of the Thuli River is just east of the park.

=== Archaeological, historical and cultural sites ===
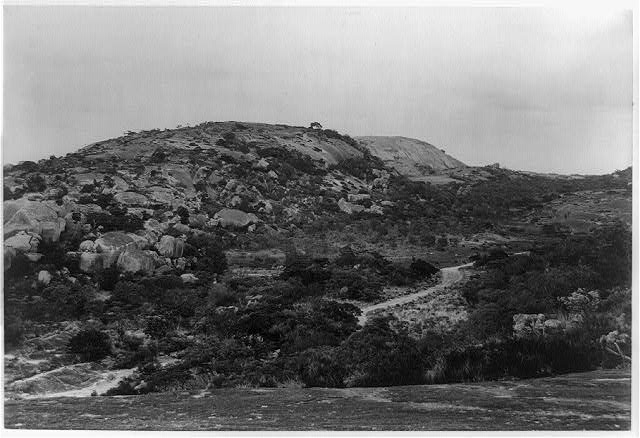
Mt Effefe ca. 1900.

San (Bushmen) lived in the hills about 2,000 years ago, leaving a rich heritage in hundreds of rock paintings. There are over 3,000 registered rock art sites, with the main periods of painting between 320 and 500 C.E.. In many crevices and caves, clay ovens and other historic artefacts have been found, and various archaeological finds date back as far as the Pre-Middle Stone Age, around 300,000 B.P. The following major sites have been developed for tourist access:

Bambata Cave is a major archaeological site, located in the west of the national park, north of the game park on the Kezi-Bulawayo road. The frieze includes elephants, giraffes, warthogs, tsessebe and mongoose.

Inanke Cave has the most extensive paintings, located in a remote cave accessible by a three-hour hike from Toghwana Dam. Along the route of the hike is an Iron Age furnace.

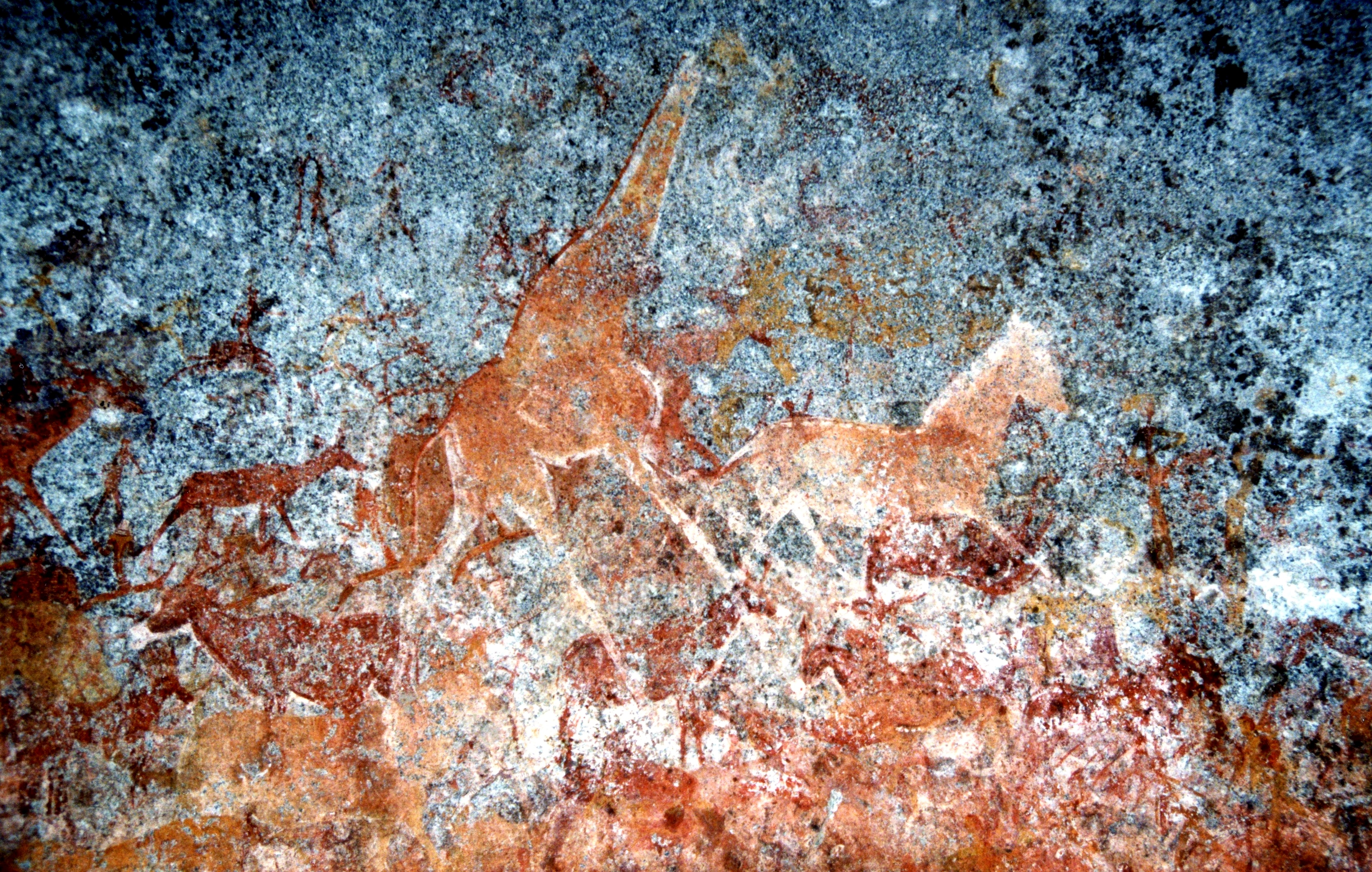
Nswatugi Cave.

Nswatugi Cave contains friezes of giraffes, elephants and kudu. Access is from Circular Drive, west of Maleme Dam. A human skeleton was found here dated to 42000 BC belonged to Middle Stone Age.

Pomongwe Cave, near Maleme Dam, was damaged by a preservation attempt in 1965, where linseed oil was applied to the paintings. Archaeological digs within and downslope of the cave revealed 39,032 stone tools, several hearths, with the main fire-making areas were in the centre of the cave floor. Bone fragments showed that hyrax formed a major part of the meat component of the diet of early human inhabitants of the cave, which also included tortoise, baboons and larger game animals. The oldest material on the site is probably pre-Middle Stone Age.

White Rhino Shelter is a small site near Gordon Park, on the main tarred road through the park. The frieze includes the outline of large rhinos, which is said to have inspired the re-introduction of the species in the 1960s.

The grandeur and stillness of the hills has contributed to their hallowed reputation, especially to the Shona and Ndebele people. Many rituals and other religious activities are performed in the hills. Before the colonial era, it was the headquarters of the spiritualist oracle, the Mlimo.

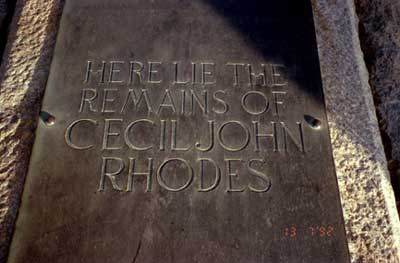
Cecil Rhodes tomb on Malindidzimu

The hills were the scene of the famous indaba between white settlers and Ndebele leaders in 1896—the Second Matabele War, known in Zimbabwe as the First Chimurenga—which ended with the assassination of the Mlimo by Frederick Russell Burnham, the American scout, in one of the Matobo caves. Upon learning of the death of the Mlimo, Cecil Rhodes boldly walked alone and unarmed into this Ndebele stronghold and persuaded the impi to lay down their arms. During the indaba it was also in these hills that Robert Baden-Powell, the Founder of Scouting, first learned woodcraft, the fundamentals of scouting, from Burnham. Today much of the pottery and artifacts found on cave floors and most of the clay grain bins in the hills are remnants from the 1896 rebellion era. There are other reminders too - bronze plaques dotting the area mark the sites of armed forts or brief skirmishes.

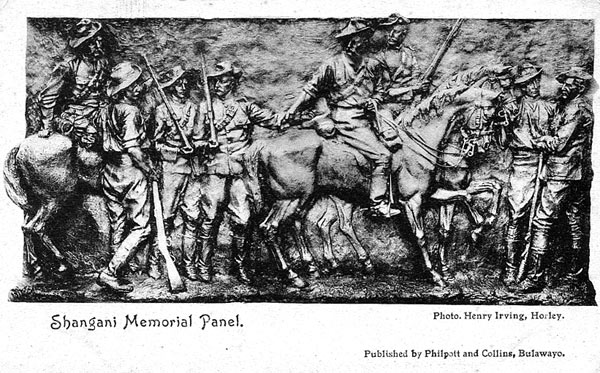
Shangani Patrol memorial at World's View

Cecil Rhodes, Leander Starr Jameson, and several other leading early white settlers, including Allan Wilson and all the members of the Shangani Patrol killed in the First Matabele War, are buried on the summit of Malindidzimu, the 'hill of the spirits' -- this is a great source of controversy in modern Zimbabwe as this is considered a sacred place by nationalists and indigenous groups. This mount is also referred to as the World’s View. (Not to be confused with the World's View, Nyanga). Mzilikazi is also buried at Matopos Hill.

A memorial shrine, erected by the Memorable Order of Tin Hats (MOTH), an organization that seeks to commemorate the sacrifice of Rhodesian servicemen and women during World War One and World War Two, can be accessed in the Park.

== Accommodation and camping ==
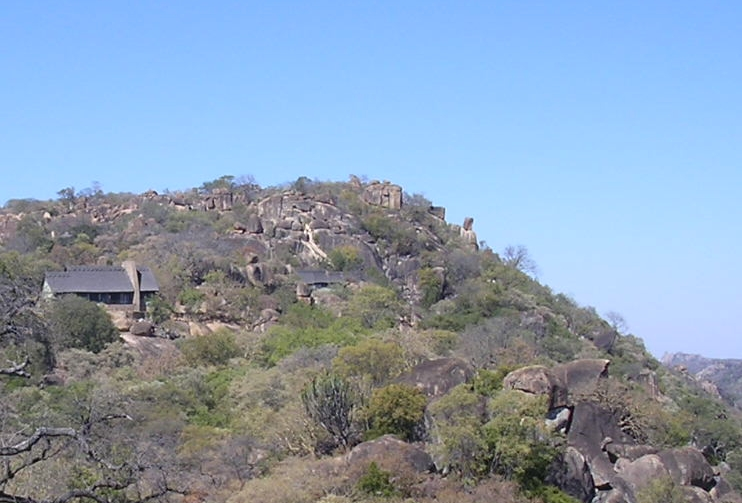
Black Eagle and Fish Eagle Lodges at Maleme Rest Camp.

=== Maleme Camp ===
This is the main camp in the centre of the park, and hosts the park headquarters. All accommodation is self-catering. There are eighteen lodges and six chalets, the former fully equipped and the latter with communal ablutions and without crockery or cutlery. Three of the lodges, Imbila, Black Eagle and Fish Eagle, offer views over the Maleme Gorge. Imbila Lodge offers a higher standard of luxury with ensuite bathrooms and teak furniture. Camping and caravan sites are situated along the eastern shores of Maleme Dam.

=== Mtsheleli Camp ===
Located in the south, this camp offers campings and caravan sites.

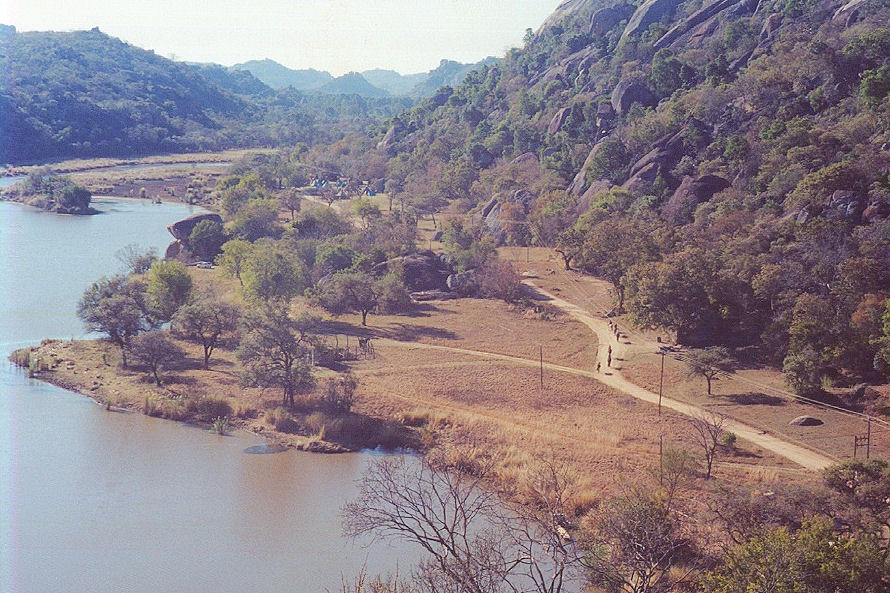
Camping sites at Maleme.

=== Mwesilume Camp ===
Located on Circular Drive, west of Maleme Dam, this camp offers campings and caravan sites.

=== Toghwana Camp ===
Located in the east, this camp offers campings and caravan sites.

=== Arboretum Camp ===
Located in the west of Lake Matopos Recreational Park, near the Hazelside Office, this camp offers campings and caravan sites.

=== Sandy Spruit Camp ===
Located in the east of Lake Matopos Recreational Park, this camp offers campings and caravan sites.

=== Lake Matopos Camp ===
Located in the north of Lake Matopos Recreational Park, this camp offers campings and caravan sites.

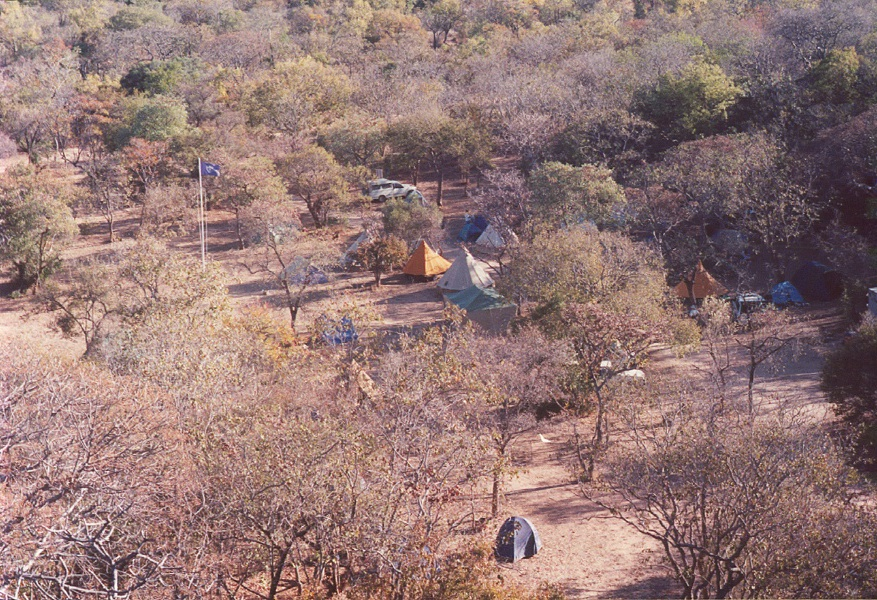
Gordon Park Scout Camp.

=== Privately operated camps and sites ===
The Boy Scouts Association of Zimbabwe operates a camp called Gordon Park, in the north of the Mtsheleli Valley. Gordon Park is a 115 ha lease from the Parks and Wildlife Management Authority and is maintained as far as possible close to natural conditions. In addition to camping sites for Scout Troops there is a small cottage. The Girl Guides Association of Zimbabwe maintains a camp site at Rowallan Park, in the north of the Mtsheleli Valley.

Big Cave Camp is a privately owned camp, bordering the Matobo National Park.

Camp Amalinda and Matobo Ingwe Lodge are commercial lodges.

== Tourism ==
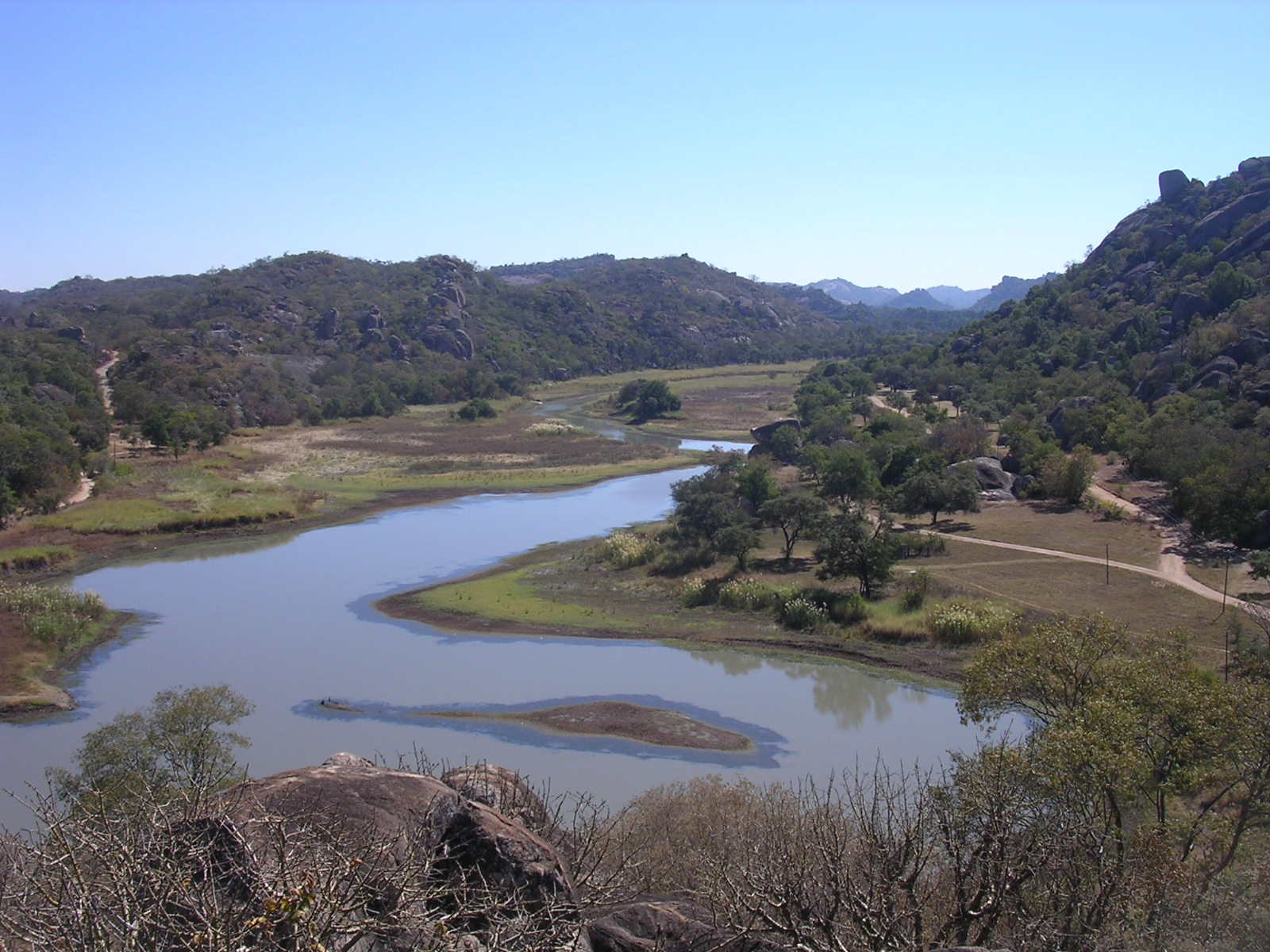
Dams such as Maleme and their environs offer opportunities for game viewing, hiking, fishing and boating.

=== Access ===
By road from Bulawayo: Take Robert Mugabe Way in the city centre; this turns into Matopos Road which continues south some 30 km to the park boundary. This is a two-lane tarred road. A single lane tarred road continues to Maleme Dam and Rest Camp. The remaining roads in the park are gravel or earth, but suitable for most vehicles. However, access to Toghwana Dam during the rainy season may require four wheel drive.

The park can also be reached from Gwanda: taking the Thuli-Makwe road towards Kezi and turning north on the main Kezi-Bulawayo road.

=== Game viewing ===
Some game can be seen throughout the park, with regular sightings of white rhino, sable antelope and impala. However, the best viewing is to be had in the 105 km^{2} Game Park, in the west of the national park. The game park, also known as Whovi or Hove Wild Area, was established with animals translocated from the border areas of Hwange National Park. It has been restocked with white and black rhinos. Other animals to be seen include sable antelope, giraffe, zebra, impala, wildebeest and ostrich. On rare occasion in the late afternoon to early evening visitors, can be lucky enough to spot leopard, with many nights being disturbed by the ruckus of baboons screaming due to leopard attacks. There are two game viewing hides.

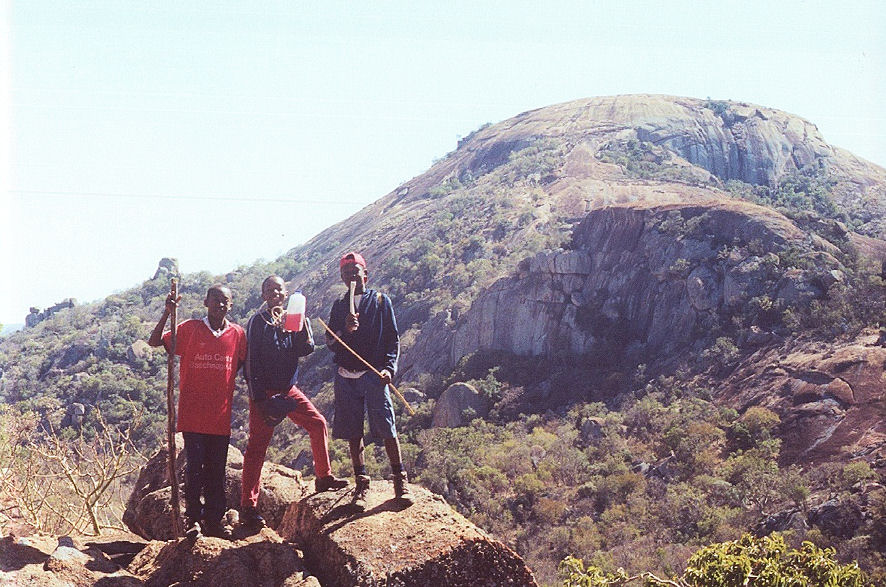
A group of Boy Scouts hiking up Nyahwe mountain with Shumbashawa mountain in the background.

=== Hiking ===
With its scenery, climate and safe environment, Matobo has a number of hiking trails. Shorter hikes and walks include:

- Lakeside walk, Maleme Dam, from Fish Eagle lodge
- Mount Pomongwe, near Maleme Camp
- Maleme Camp to Pomongwe Cave rock paintings

Longer hikes include:

- Climbing mount Shumbashawa, near Gordon Park
- Climbing Nyahwe mountain
- Hike from Toghwana Dam to Inanke Cave and rock paintings.

Accompanied hikes, with an armed game scout are available from Maleme Rest Camp

=== Running ===
The 33 miler road race is run annually in the park.

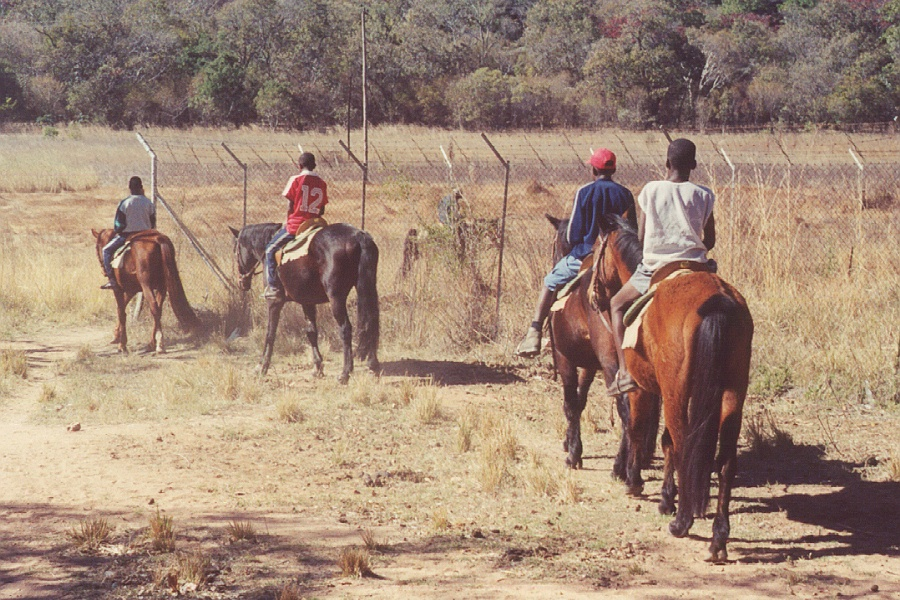
Horse riding near Maleme Dam.

=== Trail riding ===
Supervised horse trails are arranged by the Parks and Wildlife staff. There are two routes:

- From Maleme Camp and visiting scenic locations in the Maleme valley and environs.
- From Whitewater Office into the game park for game viewing.

=== Fishing ===
The many dams in the park allow for pleasant fishing, notably for Tilapia and bass. Bass were stocked into seven of the parks dams from the research station at Maleme Dam. The park entry fee includes a fishing license.

=== Boating ===
Boating is possible on the larger dams, such as Maleme, Mtshelele, Toghwana and Lake Matopos. Privately owned boats are permitted subject to approval of the parks' officials.

== In popular culture ==
A Zimbabwean cheese has been named Matopos, after the hills.

The name of the park has been used twice in films: According to director Stéphanie Machuret, the title and landscape in her 2007 film Matopos, about a traditional healer, were inspired by the park. The name was also used for the fictional Democratic Republic of Matobo in the film The Interpreter.

== See also ==
- Cecil Rhodes
- First Chimurenga
- Thuli River
