= Mpopoma (Kame) =

Location
- Country: Zimbabwe
- Region: Matabeleland

Physical characteristics
- Mouth
  - location: Zimbabwe
  - coordinates: 20°01′47″S 28°22′41″E

The Mpopoma is a seasonal river in western Zimbabwe, a tributary of the Kame (Khami River).

The Mpopoma flows through the city of Bulawayo and has been noted for waste oil pollution there.
