= The Malawi Girl Guides Association =

National Guiding association in Malawi

- Country: Malawi
- Founded: 1924/1997
- Membership: 3,375
- Affiliation: World Association of Girl Guides and Girl Scouts
- Website https://magga.mw/

The Malawi Girl Guides Association is the national Guiding association in Malawi. It is a member of the World Association of Girl Guides and Girl Scouts (WAGGGS). The Malaŵi Girl Guides Association membership stood at 3,375 as of April, 2002.

Girl Guiding was introduced to Nyasaland during the British colonial era, in 1924 in Zomba, then capital. The first training was held in Blantyre, Lilongwe and Mzuzu. Guiding was banned during the reign of President Hastings Kamuzu Banda, replaced by a youth movement called Malaŵi Youth Pioneers, linked to the Malaŵi Congress Party, the only political party allowed in what was at the time a one-party state. Girl Guiding was re-introduced in 1997, after Malaŵi moved from a one-party state to a multi-party democracy in 1994. WAGGGS sent representatives in 1995 and 1996 to offer encouragement and support, and the Malaŵi Girl Guides Association has received assistance from Norway in training leaders.

The Malaŵi Girl Guides Association serves girls aged from six to 20 years. Membership includes girls and leaders from all sectors of society. The Malaŵi Girl Guides Association is active in both urban and rural areas, with units based mainly in schools. Commissioners recruit by giving talks at schools and at church gatherings.

== See also ==
- The Scout Association of Malawi
