= The Scout Association of Malawi =

National Scouting association of Malawi

- Country: Malawi
- Founded: 1931/2001
- Membership: 4,000
- Affiliation: World Organization of the Scout Movement

Established in 1931, the Scout Association of Malaŵi (SAM) was disallowed between 1964 and 1996. Scouting in Malaŵi shares history with Zimbabwe and Zambia, with which it was linked for decades. The 4,000 member Scout Association of Malaŵi was reorganized in 1996 and became a member of the World Organization of the Scout Movement in September 2005.

== History of Scouting in Malaŵi ==
The historic badge of Scouting in Nyasaland incorporated a leopard on lookout, with the rising sun, an element maintained in the coat of arms as well as the flag of Malawi, in the background.

Scouting in the former Rhodesia and Nyasaland started in 1909 during the British colonial era, when the first Boy Scout troop was registered. Scouting grew quickly and in 1924 Rhodesia and Nyasaland sent a large contingent to the second World Scout Jamboree in Ermelunden, Denmark.

The great popularity of the Boy Scout movement was due to its outdoor program such as hiking, camping, cooking and pioneering, which was unusual in the protectorate. Additionally, the training and progressive badge system was targeted towards helping others, leading to responsible citizenship.

Because of the prevailing circumstances earlier in the 20th century, a separate movement was established for black Africans called "Pathfinders". By the 1950s the time was considered to merge both movements into one Scout Association. Since independence, as a Commonwealth member, Scouting in Malaŵi continued under The Scout Association, though it had the option to register directly with the World Scout Bureau. Scouting was banned during the reign of President Hastings Kamuzu Banda since the 1970s, despite the country's longstanding relationship with British Scouting, replaced by a youth movement called Malaŵi Youth Pioneers. Scouting was re-introduced in 2001, after Malaŵi moved from a one-party state to a multi-party democracy in 1994.

== Malaŵi's fresh start ==
The Malaŵi Scout Association was officially relaunched in 2001, and its members are now building upon their newfound freedom of expression. Representatives from the Scout Association of Northern Ireland and the North Yorkshire Scout County recently established contact with Malaŵi, and the expedition Sunrise Malaŵi 2007 builds upon these new relationships.

On 6 July 2003 Scouts from Northern Ireland visited Malaŵi, where they donated Scout items to the First Ekwendi Scout group in Mzuzu. Northern Ireland Cub Scout Leader Margaret Qua made the presentation, which was received by the Chairman of the Malaŵi Scout Association, Ahabu Kafansiyanji.

Making the presentation, Margaret said, "We are pleased to be associated with Scouting in Malaŵi, and promise to assist whenever we can in a brotherhood manner as we respect the Scout Law." She said that she was impressed with how Scouting in Malaŵi is growing and encouraged the leadership to work hard and reach out to more young people in Malaŵi.

The uniform flag of the Scout Association of Malawi

Kafansiyanji said the donation would go a long way to assist the local association, especially in view of the challenges facing young people in the areas of education, health, environment and youth involvement in decision making.

The African Regional Office gave the necessary support to ensure that Malaŵi qualified for recognition by the World Organization of the Scout Movement.

Since reforming, the Scout Association of Malaŵi has managed to rescue over 30 street children, and has sent them to various colleges around the country. The number of children who have benefited from the Scout Association of Malaŵi is around 1,000 across the country.

== Sunrise Malaŵi 2007 ==
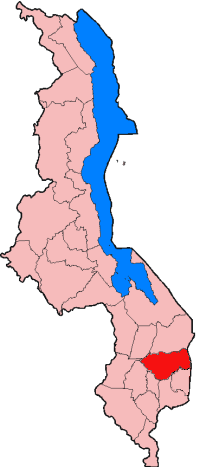
Zomba District, location of the Scout Association of Malaŵi centre

The United Kingdom Africa Scout Fellowship launched an initiative to take British Scouts to Malaŵi in July 2007. The expedition to Malaŵi was designed to run in parallel with the World Jamboree, and took its title from the proposed Sunrise Ceremony. The objective of this expedition was to spend five weeks in Malaŵi, working alongside the Scout Association of Malaŵi, which culminated in the inauguration of their national campsite. The region also has strong links with Scandinavia, and it was hoped that Swedish and Norwegian Scouts would join the UK expedition party, however this was not possible.

Malaŵi hosted events on 4 July 2007 to mark celebrations of the Scouting 2007 Centenary, as 21 Scouts from the United Kingdom arrived to assist the Scout Association of Malaŵi.

Speaking on arrival at Kamuzu International Airport, the chairman of the UK-Africa Scout Fellowship, George Devine said part of the work they would do would be to kick-start rehabilitation of the Scout Association of Malaŵi centre at Songani in Zomba, where the centenary celebrations were held. He said that as part of the celebrations, the centre, which was still owned by the British Scout Association, would be formally handed over to the Scout Association of Malaŵi, as it has been rehabilitated to world Scout standards.

A badge from the Makwawa centre in Songani.

Another group of about 22 UK Scouts also came to Malaŵi in July 2007 for the centenary celebrations, and they also met President Bingu wa Mutharika, who is the patron of the Scout Association of Malaŵi.

Scout Association of Malaŵi executive director Steve Kanene said that when the rehabilitation work is finished, the centre will be able to accommodate 150 people, from its current capacity of 10. "There is also going to be a maize mill and grocery store for the community surrounding the centre and we want to extend water pipes to the community because there is usually a problem of water in the area every year," Kanene said.

The Scout Association of Malaŵi raised about two million Malawian kwacha to prepare for the celebrations, and the upgrading work at Songani will cost 35 million kwacha, which will be footed by the UK Scout Association.

Malaŵi sent a contingent to the 21st World Scout Jamboree in Essex.

== New Horizons Scotland - Malaŵi 2011 ==
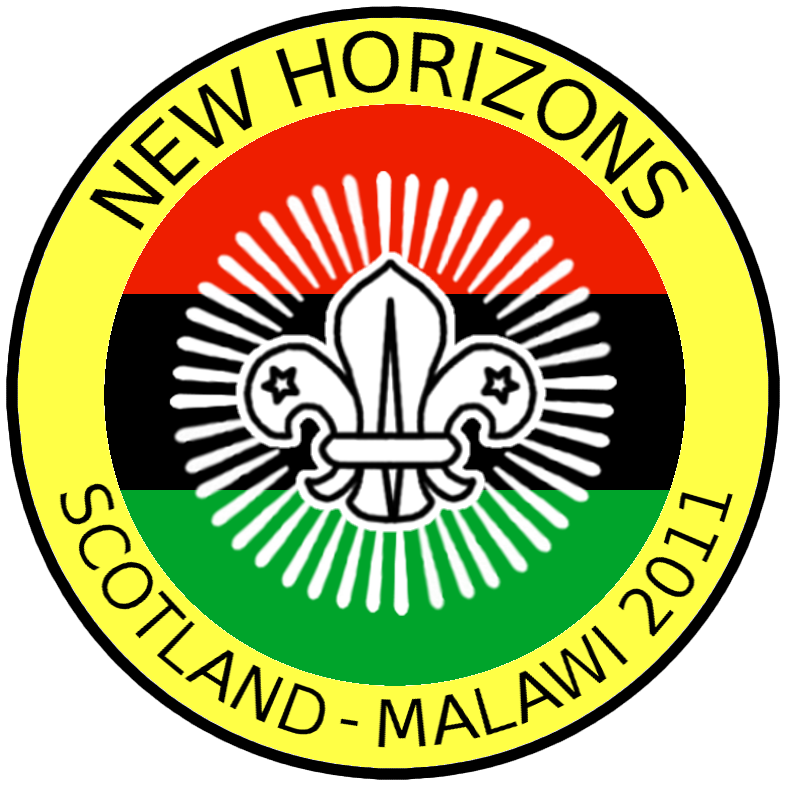
New Horizons Scotland - Malawi 2011 expedition badge

After the initiative by Scouts in Scotland to raise money for SAM, another expedition has been arranged to return to Makwawa to do some work using the funds raised. Some of the money has already been used to build the maize mill described by Steve Kanene in 2007, and the rest will be going to further development projects on site. A team of 37 young people, aged 14–19, and 13 adult leaders have been gathered from across Scotland to aid in this work.

== See also ==
- The Malawi Girl Guides Association
