= Girl Guides Association of Zimbabwe =

National Guiding organization of Zimbabwe

- Headquarters: 151 Harare Street, Harare
- Country: Zimbabwe
- Founded: 1912
- Membership: 49,184
- Affiliation: World Association of Girl Guides and Girl Scouts

The emblem of the previous Girl Guides Association of Rhodesia incorporated the Zimbabwe Bird.

The Girl Guides Association of Zimbabwe (GGAZ) is the national Guiding organisation of Zimbabwe. It serves 49,184 members as of 2018. Founded in 1912, the girls-only organisation became a full member of the World Association of Girl Guides and Girl Scouts as the Girl Guides Association of Rhodesia in 1969. The Wayfarers, a sort of Guiding for native African girls began in 1926 after a visit to the colony by Olave Baden-Powell. In 1935 there were some 600 Wayfarers and 300 Sunbeams, the African equivalent of Brownies in Guiding. In 1940, the two movements started to merge; this process was completed in 1950. The name of the association changed in 1981 from the Girl Guides Association of Rhodesia to the Girl Guides Association of Zimbabwe.

== Programme ==
The programme of the Girl Guides Association of Zimbabwe caters for girls from 5 to 21 years of age.

- Sunbeams - ages 5 to 7
- Brownies - ages 7 to 10
- Guides - ages 10 to 16
- Rangers - ages 14 to 21

There is also a group of Young Leaders (Flame Rangers) of young women who are not affiliated to any Unit or help in leadership from 17 to 30 years of Age

== Ideals ==
Guide promise (English version):
I promise that I will do my best
To do my duty to God
To serve my country and other people
And to keep the Guide Law

== See also ==
- The Boy Scouts Association of Zimbabwe
